= Kalyani subdivision =

- Subdivision
- Coordinates: 22.98°N 88.48°E
- Country: India
- State: West Bengal
- District: Nadia
- Headquarters: Kalyani

Languages
  - Official: Bengali, English
- Time zone: UTC+5:30 (IST)
- ISO 3166 code: IN-WB
- Vehicle registration: WB
- Website: nadia.nic.in

Kalyani subdivision is an administrative subdivision of the Nadia district in the Indian state of West Bengal.

== Overview ==
Nadia district is part of the large alluvial plain formed by the Ganges-Bhagirathi system. The plains spread southwards from the head of the delta. The Kalyani subdivision has the Bhagirathi on the west, with Hooghly district lying across the river. Topographically, Kalyani subdivision is part of the Ranaghat-Chakdaha Plain, the low-lying area found in the south-eastern part of the district. The area slopes southwards. The area had large forests. The huge influx of East Bengali refugees that took place in the district immediately after the partition of India and the steady influx ever since paved way for conversion of forest into agricultural land.

== Subdivisions ==
Nadia district is divided into the following administrative subdivisions:

Subdivision	Headquarters	Area km^{2}	Population (2011)	Rural population % (2011)	Urban population % (2011)
Tehatta	Tehatta	862.18	796,245	97.15	2.85
Krishnanagar Sadar	Krishnanagar	1,661.10	2,186,503	79.205	20.795
Ranaghat	Ranaghat	893.58	1,432,761	58.32	41.68
Kalyani	Kalyani	526.57	891,563	23.27	76.73
Nadia district	Krishnanagar	3,927.00	5,307,072	66.86	33.14

Cities and towns in Kalyani subdivision of Nadia district
M: municipal town/ city/notified area, CT: census town, R: rural/ urban centre.
Owing to space constraints in the small map, the actual locations in a larger map may vary slightly

== Administrative units ==
Kalyani subdivision has 3 police stations and one police phari under Haringhata P.S., 3 community development blocks, 3 panchayat samitis, 27 gram panchayats, 245 mouzas, 219 inhabited villages 4 municipalities and 13 census towns. The municipalities are: Kalyani, Chakdaha, Haringhata, and Gayespur. The census towns are: Punglia, Darappur, Lalpur, Chanduria, Shimurali, Priyanagar, Jangal, Madanpur, Saguna, Kulia, Simhat, Subarnapur and Digha.

The subdivision has its headquarters at Kalyani.

== Police stations ==
Police stations in Kalyani subdivision have the following features and jurisdiction:

Police station	Area covered km^{2}	Municipal town	CD Block And Gram Panchayat
Kalyani	64	Kalyani, Gayespur	Saguna (GP)
Chakdaha	351.19	Chakdaha	Chakdaha
Haringhata	170	Haringhata	Haringhata

== Blocks ==
Community development blocks in Kalyani subdivision are:

CD Block	Headquarters	Area km^{2}	Population (2011)	SC %	ST %	Hindus %	Muslims %	Literacy rate %	Census Towns
Chakdaha	Chakdaha	288.80	405,719	45.83	5.33	83.66	14.65	80.03	10
Haringhata	Subarnapur	170.32	231,068	31.92	4.85	71.09	28.19	82.15	3
Kalyani	Jangalgram								

== Gram panchayats ==
The subdivision contains 27 gram panchayats under 3 community development blocks:

Kalyani block consists of 7 gram panchayats, viz. Saguna, Madanpur - 1, Madanpur - 2, Chanduria - 2, Simurali, Kanchrapara, Sarati.

Chakdaha block consists of 10 gram panchayats, viz. Chanduria I, Dewli, Dubra, Ghetugachhi, Hingnara, Silinda I, Silinda II, Tatla I, Tatla II and Rautari

Haringhata block consists of 8 gram panchayats, viz. Birohi–I, Kastodanga–II, Nagarukhra–I, Birohi–II, Mollabelia, Fatepur, Kastodanga–I and Nagarukhra–II.

== Education ==
Nadia district had a literacy rate of 74.97% as per the provisional figures of the census of India 2011. Tehatta subdivision had a literacy rate of 67.25%, Krishnanagar Sadar subdivision 71.03%, Ranaghat subdivision 79.51% and Kalyani subdivision 83.35.

Given in the table below (data in numbers) is a comprehensive picture of the education scenario in Nadia district for the year 2013-14:

Subdivision	Primary School		Middle School		High School		Higher Secondary School		General College, Univ		Technical / Professional Instt		Non-formal Education	
Subdivision	Institution	Student	Institution	Student	Institution	Student	Institution	Student	Institution	Student	Institution	Student	Institution	Student
Tehatta	424	35,755	27	3,746	12	9,223	53	85,338	2	9,556	7	705	1,321	49,314
Krishnanagar Sadar	1,066	106,019	82	14,710	39	22,754	160	222,437	9	26,970	24	3,265	2,836	106,868
Ranaghat	707	57,335	45	4,494	39	20,958	106	147,018	4	22,678	4	326	2,000	58,835
Kalyani	428	32,856	28	2,594	15	7,160	86	95,192	4	15477	27	12,522	1,160	22,331
Nadia district	2,625	231,965	182	25,544	105	60,695	405	549,985	19	74,771	62	16,548	7,317	237,348

Note: Primary schools include junior basic schools; middle schools, high schools and higher secondary schools include madrasahs; technical schools include junior technical schools, junior government polytechnics, industrial technical institutes, industrial training centres, nursing training institutes etc.; technical and professional colleges include engineering colleges, medical colleges, para-medical institutes, management colleges, teachers training and nursing training colleges, law colleges, art colleges, music colleges etc. Special and non-formal education centres include sishu siksha kendras, madhyamik siksha kendras, centres of Rabindra mukta vidyalaya, recognised Sanskrit tols, institutions for the blind and other handicapped persons, Anganwadi centres, reformatory schools etc.

The following institutions are located in Kalyani subdivision:

- University of Kalyani, is an affiliating, teaching and research university, established at Kalyani in 1960.
- Bidhan Chandra Krishi Viswavidyalaya, an agricultural university, was established at Mohanpur in 1974.
- Kalyani Government Engineering College, was established at Kalyani in 1995.
- JIS College of Engineering, an autonomous institute, was established at Kalyani in 2000.
- Indian Institute of Science Education and Research, an autonomous institute, was established at Mohanpur in 2006.
- College of Medicine & JNM Hospital, a medical college, was established at Kalyani in 2009. It is affiliated with West Bengal University of Health Sciences.
- Indian Institute of Information Technology, Kalyani, one of the twenty IIITs in the country, was established at Kalyani in 2014.
- Kalyani Mahavidyalaya was established at Kalyani in 1999. Affiliated to the University of Kalyani, it offers honours courses in Bengali, English, history, economics, sociology, education, geography, computer science, molecular biology with bio-technology, micro biology, mathematics, chemistry, statistics and accountancy.
- Chakdaha College was established at Chakdaha in 1972. Affiliated to the University of Kalyani, it offers honours courses in Bengali, English, Sanskrit, economics, history, political science, geography, physics, chemistry, mathematics, botany, zoology and accountancy.
- Haringhata Mahavidyalaya was established at Haringhata in 1986. Affiliated to the University of Kalyani, it offers honours courses in Bengali, English, geography, education, history, political science and accountancy.
- Snehansu Kanta Acharya Institute of Law was established at Kalyani in 2004. The institute is named after Snehansu Kanta Acharya, a legal luminary and a Marxist politician.

== Healthcare ==
The table below (all data in numbers) presents an overview of the medical facilities available and patients treated in the hospitals, health centres and sub-centres in 2014 in Nadia district.

Subdivision	Health & Family Welfare Deptt, WB				Other State Govt Deptts	Local bodies	Central Govt Deptts / PSUs	NGO / Private Nursing Homes	Total	Total Number of Beds	Total Number of Doctors*	Indoor Patients	Outdoor Patients
Subdivision	Hospitals	Rural Hospitals	Block Primary Health Centres	Primary Health Centres	Other State Govt Deptts	Local bodies	Central Govt Deptts / PSUs	NGO / Private Nursing Homes	Total	Total Number of Beds	Total Number of Doctors*	Indoor Patients	Outdoor Patients
Tehatta	1	1	2	7	-	-	-	6	17	405	36	36,811	1,035,750
Krishnanagar Sadar	3	4	3	20	2	16	1	31	80	2,386	113	165,867	2,304,887
Ranaghat	2	1	2	15	1	8	-	21	50	780	104	58,507	1,426,852
Kalyani	4	1	-	7	1	5	-	25	43	1,863	226	90,327	1,272,701
Nadia district	10	7	7	49	4	29	1	83	190	5,434	479	351,512	6,040,190

.* Excluding nursing homes

=== Medical facilities ===
Medical facilities in Kalyani subdivision are as follows:

Hospitals in Kalyani subdivision: (Name, location, beds),
All India Institute of Medical Sciences, Kalyani (AIIMS - KALYANI), Basantapur, Saguna, Kalyani, Nadia, West Bengal, India - 741245
Chakdah State General Hospital, Chakdaha, 100 beds
Gandhi Memorial Hospital, Gayespur, 350 beds
Netaji Subhas Sanatorium, Gayespur, 925 beds
Jawaharlal Nehru Memorial Hospital, Kalyani, 550 beds
E.S.I. Hospital, Kalyani, 266 beds

Rural Hospital and BPHC: (Name, block, location, beds)
Haringhata Rural Hospital, Haringhata CD Block, Mohanpur, 25 beds

Block Primary Health Centres: (Name, CD block, location, beds)
Chowgacha Block Primary Health Centre, Chakdaha CD Block, Chaugacha, 10 beds

Primary Health Centres (CD Block-wise)(CD Block, PHC location, beds) (CD block-wise)(CD block, PHC location, beds)
Chakdaha CD Block: Moshra (6 beds), Srinagar (10 beds), Sutargachhi (6 beds)
Haringhata CD Block: Birohi (6 beds), Kastadanga (6 beds), Nagarukhra (10 beds)

== Electoral constituencies ==
Lok Sabha (parliamentary) and Vidhan Sabha (state assembly) constituencies in Kalyani subdivision were as follows:

Lok Sabha constituency	Reservation	Vidhan Sabha constituency	Reservation	CD Block and/or Gram panchayats and/or municipal areas
Ranaghat	Reserved for SC	Chakdaha	None	Chakdaha municipality, and Chanduria I, Dubra, Ghetugachhi, Rautari, Silinda I, Silinda II, Tatla I and Tatla II gram panchayats of Chakdaha community development block
		Other Vidhan Sabha segments in Ranaghat subdivision		
Bangaon	Reserved for SC	Kalyani	Reserved for SC	Kalyani municipality, Gayespur municipality, and Chanduria II, Kanchrapara, Madanpur I, Madanpur II, Saguna, Sarati and Simurali GPs of Kalyani CD Block
		Haringhata	Reserved for SC	Haringhata community development block, and Dewli and Hingara gram panchayats of Chakdaha community development block.
		All other Vidhan Sabha segments in North 24 Parganas district		
