= Bankim Chandra Ghosh =

Indian politician

- বঙ্কিম চন্দ্র ঘোষ

Member of the West Bengal Legislative Assembly
- Incumbent
- Assumed office 2 May 2021
- Preceded by: Ratna kar Ghosh
- Constituency: Chakdaha
- In office 2001–2011
- Preceded by: Mili Hira
- Succeeded by: Nilima Nag Mallick
- Constituency: Haringhata

Personal details
- Born: Haringhata, Nadia, West Bengal
- Party: Bharatiya Janata Party(from 2019)
- Other political affiliations: Communist Party of India (Marxist) (until 2019)
- Profession: Politician

Bankim Chandra Ghosh is an Indian politician from the Bharatiya Janata Party. In May 2021, he was elected as a member of the West Bengal Legislative Assembly from Chakdaha (constituency). He defeated Subhankar Singha of All India Trinamool Congress by 11,680 votes in 2021 West Bengal Assembly election. In 2019, he joined the Bharatiya Janata Party after the 2019 Indian General election after resigning from the Communist Party of India (Marxist).
