= Digha, Nadia =

Digha
- Census Town
- Location in West Bengal, India Digha (India)
- Coordinates: 22.945888°N 88.545409°E
- Country: India
- State: West Bengal
- District: Nadia

Area
  - Total: 1.6147 km^{2} (0.6234 sq mi)

Population (2011)
  - Total: 6,945
  - Density: 4,301/km^{2} (11,140/sq mi)

Languages
  - Official: Bengali, English
- Time zone: UTC+5:30 (IST)
- PIN: 7412459
- Telephone/STD code: 03216
- Lok Sabha constituency: Bangaon
- Vidhan Sabha constituency: Haringhata
- Website: nadia.gov.in

Digha is a census town in the Haringhata CD block in the Kalyani subdivision of the Nadia district in the state of West Bengal, India.

== Geography ==
Cities and towns in Kalyani subdivision of Nadia district
M: municipal town/ city/notified area, CT: census town, R: rural/ urban centre.
Owing to space constraints in the small map, the actual locations in a larger map may vary slightly

=== Location ===
Digha is located at 22.945888°N 88.545409°E.

Digha is not shown in Google maps. The map of Haringhata CD block, in the District Census Handbook 2011, Nadia, shows Digha south of Simhat, which is also shown in Google maps. The map in the census handbook identifies the presence of high school/ inter college in Digha. While Jagulia is identified in 2011 census as a separate place, Bara Jagulia is not identified as a separate place, and the area appears to be part of Digha.

=== Area overview ===
Nadia district is part of the large alluvial plain formed by the Ganges-Bhagirathi system. The Kalyani subdivision has the Bhagirathi/ Hooghly on the west. Topographically, Kalyani subdivision is a part of the Ranaghat-Chakdaha Plain, the low-lying area found in the south-eastern part of the district. The smallest subdivision in the district, area-wise, has the highest level of urbanisation in the district. 76.73% of the population lives in urban areas and 23.27% lives in the rural areas.

Note: The map alongside presents some of the notable locations in the subdivision. All places marked in the map are linked in the larger full screen map. All the four subdivisions are presented with maps on the same scale – the size of the maps vary as per the area of the subdivision.

== Demographics ==
According to the 2011 Census of India, Digha had a total population of 6,916, of which 3,456 (50%) were males and 3,460 (46%) were females. Population in the age range 0–6 years was 510. The total number of literate persons in Digha was 5,968 (93.16% of the population over 6 years).

== Infrastructure ==
According to the District Census Handbook 2011, Nadia, Digha covered an area of 2.0986 km^{2}. Among the civic amenities, the protected water supply involved tap water from treated source, hand pump. It had 692 domestic electric connections. Among the medical facilities it had 1 hospital, 7 nursing home, 1 veterinary hospital. Among the educational facilities it had 3 primary schools, 1 middle school, 1 secondary school, 2 senior secondary schools. It had 1 non-formal education centre (Sarva Shiksha Abiyan). Among the social, recreational and cultural facilities it had 1 cinema theatre, 1 auditorium/ community hall, 1 public library, 1 reading room. Two important commodities it produced were vegetable, paddy. It had the branch office of 1 nationalised bank, 1 private commercial bank, 1 cooperative bank.

== Education ==
Bara Jaguli Gopal Academy is a Bengali-medium boys only institution established in 1921. The school has facilities for teaching from class V to class XII. It has a library with 1,200 books, 7 computers and a playground.

Raj Laxmi Kanya Vidyapith is a Bengali-medium girls only institution established in 1955. The school has facilities for teaching from class V to class XII. It has a library with 2,541 books, 10 computers and playground.
