= Anil Ghorai =

Indian writer

Anil Gharai
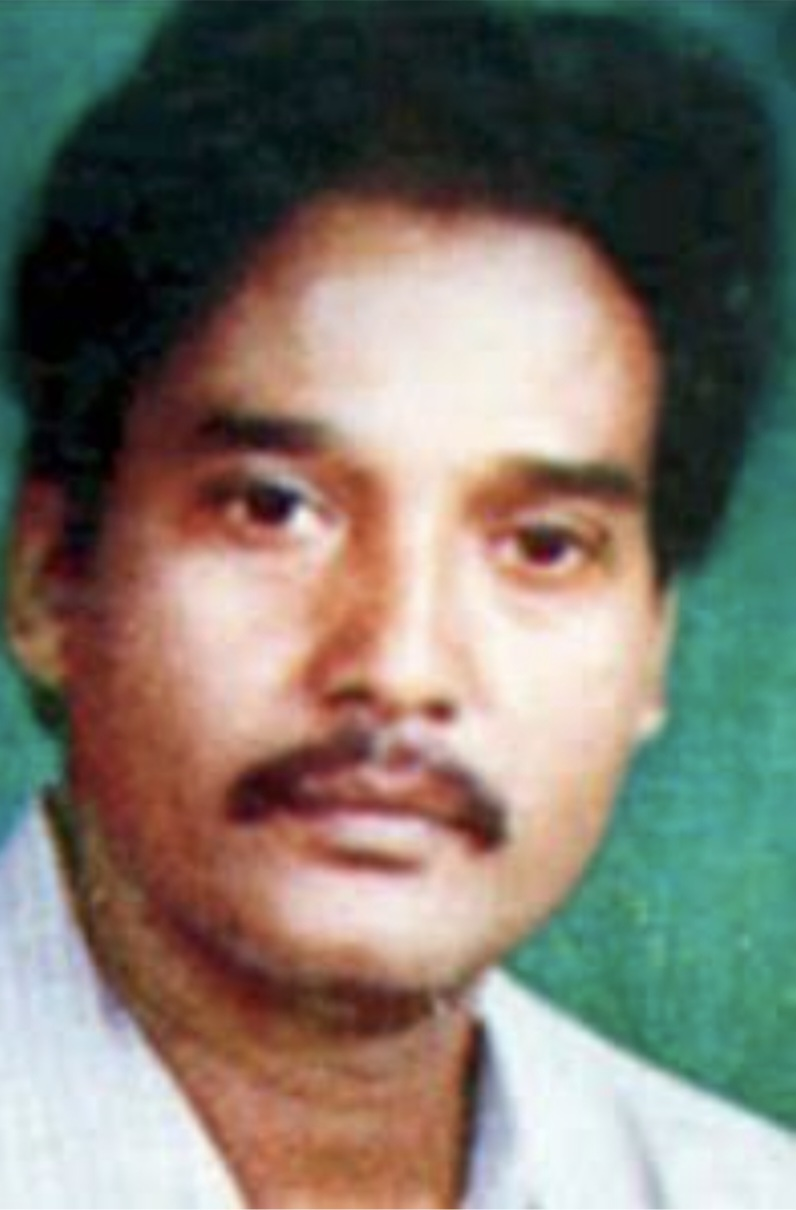
- Born: 1 November 1957; Rukminipur, East Medinipur, West Bengal, India
- Died: 23 November 2014 (aged 57); Kolkata, India
- Education: Bipradas Pal Chowdhury Institute of Technology Jadavpur University
- Occupations: Novelist, Writer, Poet
- Awards: Bankim Puraskar (2010)

Anil Ghorai (Bengali: অনিল ঘড়াই) (1 November 1957 – 23 November 2014) was a Bengali writer based in West Bengal, India. He was born in Rukminipur village near Egra in what is now Purba Medinipur district. His first short story was published in 1990 in the Desh magazine. He has authored over 74 books.

== Early life ==
Anil Ghorai was born on 1 November 1957 in Rukminipur village of Egra subdivision of Purba Medinipur in a Mahishya family to Abhimanyu Ghorai and Tilottoma Debi. He moved to Nagarukhra in Nadia in 1962 at only 5 years of age for education. He graduated from Bipradas Pal Chowdhury Institute of Technology in 1980. He was admitted to Jadavpur University to study Industrial engineering.

== Nature of his works ==
He was a valuable contributor to the massive change that began in Bengali novels and stories in the 1970s. He left a deep impression in his writings one after another. His writings focused on the lower rungs of society.

Anil's first novel, 'Nunbari' (1989), was a story of the recovery of a neglected girl from the Noonmara community, which is intertwined with the life of Malangi society. ‘Durbogarar Upakhyan’ (1997) is a story about the tribal people of Bihar. During the winter season, the local tribal people go to the Durbogara river to search for gold which is their livelihood. ‘Nil dukhyer chobi’ (2001) is the first Bengali novel written about the life of the Kakmara community. They make a living by selling their produce. They raise pigs. Their main livelihood is begging. Anil Gharai's most notable work, and a memorable achievement in Bengali novels, is 'Ananta Draghima' (2009). In this large-scale novel, the picture of a marginalized public life has come to life in a wide-ranging narrative.

== List of major works ==
=== Novels ===
- Nunbari
- Megh Jiboner Trishna (1996)
- Banabashi (1990)
- Mukuler Gondho (1993)
- Boba Juddho (1993)
- Tarango Lata (1993)
- Kanone Kusum Koli (1993)
- Brokrorekha (1994)
- Plaban (1994)
- Dhormer Kol (1995)
- Koler Putul (1996)
- Dourbogorar Upakhayan (1997)
- Khelaghor (1998)
- Janma Daag (1999)
- Biparid Juddheyr Mohora (2001)
- Pata Orar Din (2002)
- Samne Sagar (2003)
- Ananta Draghimaa (2009)

=== Story Books ===
- Kak (1982)
- Parijan (1985)
- Aagun (1987)
- Gyan Brikher Fol (1988)
- Kotash (1990)
- Jol Chiruni (1991)
- Jermaner Maa (1991)
- Bharatborsho (1992)
- Garbha Dao (1993)
- Anil Gharai er Choto Golpo (1995)
- Kaamkuthiya (1996)
- Akash Maatir Khela (1997)
- Loo (1997)
- Swapner Khora Pakhi (1998)
- Swet Paddyo (1998)
- Godana (1998)
- Akhhormala (1998)
- Neel Aakasher Tara (1999)
- Parijaan O Anyanno Golpo (2000)
- Saadh Bhokkhon (2000)
- Nodi Maa (2000)
- Hriday Pete Aachi (2002)
- Lodha Grame Shuryaday (2003)
- Shreshtha Golpo (Bookfair 2008)

=== Children's Story Books ===
- Laali Duli (1992)
- Foring Singh er Bahaduri (1998)
- Sheru (1999)
- Arfaan Chachar Ghora (2000)

=== English Story Books ===
- Stories of the Downtroden (2003)
- Noonbari (2005)

=== Hindi Story Books ===
- Tikli (1999)
- Dankk (1999)
- Fulpari (2001)
- Chawkidaar (2002)

=== Poetry Books ===
- Batasher Swarolipi (2003)
- Jaadu Orna (2004)
- Roudro Songshkaar (2005)
- Aaguner Padabali (2009)
- Ghaam Ashru O Aagun (2009)
- Pata Shorir (2010)
- Bhatful Bahtgondho (2011)
- Bonshai Bishaad (2012)

A book named "Shwetpadma"(collection of few short stories) is also available in the market.

== Awards and honors ==
- Sanskriti Award (1991) by President of India
- Michael Madusudhan Award (1994)
- Tarashankar Award (2001)
- Bankim Puraskar (2010)
- Dalit Sahitya Academy Purashkar
