= Ukrah =

- Village
- Location in West Bengal, India
- Coordinates: 22.92375°N 88.66907°E
- Country: India
- State: West Bengal
- District: Nadia

Area
  - Total: 4.78 km^{2} (1.85 sq mi)
- Elevation: 12 m (39 ft)

Population (2011)
  - Total: 13,548
  - Density: 2,830/km^{2} (7,340/sq mi)

Languages
  - Official: Bengali, English
- Time zone: UTC+5:30 (IST)
- PIN code: 741257
- Area code: 03473
- Lok Sabha constituency: Bangaon
- Vidhan Sabha constituency: Haringhata
- Website: nadia.nic.in

Ukrah is a village in Haringhata CD Block in Kalyani subdivision of Nadia district in the Indian state of West Bengal.

== Geography ==
Ukrah is located at 22.92375°N 88.66907°E. It has an average elevation of 12 metres (39 feet).

== Demographics ==
According to the 2011 census, Ukrah had a population of 13,548, comprising 6,974 males and 6,574 females. Ukrah has an average literacy rate of 83.91%, with 1,309 (9.66%) of the population between 0–6 years of age.

== Groundwater contamination ==
Ukrah is one of the areas where the groundwater is affected by arsenic contamination.
