= Ashim Kumar Sarkar =

Indian politician

Asim Kumar Sarkar

Member of the West Bengal Legislative Assembly
- Incumbent
- Assumed office 2 May 2021
- Preceded by: Nilima Nag
- Constituency: Haringhata

Personal details
- Born: 17 November 1960 (age 65)
- Party: Bharatiya Janata Party
- Profession: Folk Singer/Kabigan (Gold Medalist)

Asim Kumar Sarkar is an Indian politician from Bharatiya Janata Party and a folk singer (Kavigan). In May 2021, he was elected as a member of the West Bengal Legislative Assembly from Haringhata (constituency). He defeated Nilima Nag of All India Trinamool Congress by 15,200 votes in 2021 West Bengal Assembly election.

Recently mahogany and mango trees of the MLA's land were cut down by miscreants, the arrow of his accusation is against the opposition's miscreants.
