= Subarnapur, Nadia =

Subarnapur
- Census Town
- Location in West Bengal, India Subarnapur (India)
- Coordinates: 22.955751°N 88.571849°E
- Country: India
- State: West Bengal
- District: Nadia

Population (2011)
  - Total: 5,759

Languages
  - Official: Bengali, English
- Time zone: UTC+5:30 (IST)
- Telephone code: 03454
- Vehicle registration: WB
- Lok Sabha constituency: Bongaon
- Vidhan Sabha constituency: Haringhata
- Website: nadia.gov.in

Subarnapur is a census town in the Haringhata CD block in the Kalyani subdivision of the Nadia district in the state of West Bengal, India.

== Geography ==
Cities and towns in Kalyani subdivision of Nadia district
M: municipal town/ city/notified area, CT: census town, R: rural/ urban centre.
Owing to space constraints in the small map, the actual locations in a larger map may vary slightly

=== Location ===
Subarnapur is located at 22.955751°N 88.571849°E.

=== Area overview ===
Nadia district is part of the large alluvial plain formed by the Ganges-Bhagirathi system. The Kalyani subdivision has the Bhagirathi/ Hooghly on the west. Topographically, Kalyani subdivision is a part of the Ranaghat-Chakdaha Plain, the low-lying area found in the south-eastern part of the district. The smallest subdivision in the district, area-wise, has the highest level of urbanisation in the district. 76.73% of the population lives in urban areas and 23.27% lives in the rural areas.

Note: The map alongside presents some of the notable locations in the subdivision. All places marked in the map are linked in the larger full screen map. All the four subdivisions are presented with maps on the same scale – the size of the maps vary as per the area of the subdivision.

== Demographics ==
According to the 2011 Census of India, Subarnapur had a total population of 5,759, of which 2,899 (50%) were males and 2,860 (50%) were females. Population in the age range 0–6 years was 446. The total number of literate persons in Subarnapur was 4,683 (88.14% of the population over 6 years).

== Civic administration ==
=== CD block HQ ===
The headquarters of Haringhata CD block are located at Subarnapur.

== Infrastructure ==
According to the District Census Handbook 2011, Nadia, Subarnapur covered an area of 1.3491 km^{2}. Among the civic amenities, the protected water supply involved hand pump, tube well/ bore well. It had 552 domestic electric connections. Among the medical facilities it had 1 dispensary/ health centre, 1 family welfare centre, 1 maternity and child welfare centre, 1 maternity home, 23 medicine shops. Among the educational facilities it had 3 primary schools, other school facilities at Ganguria 1 km away. Among the social, recreational and cultural facilities it had 1 public library, 1 reading room. Two important commodities it produced were paddy, vegetable. It had the branch office of 1 cooperative bank.

== Education ==
Haringhata Mahavidyalaya is a co-educational institution, established at Subarnapur in 1986, and affiliated to the University of Kalyani. It offers honours courses in Bengali, English, geography, education, political science, history and accountancy.
