= Chaugacha =

- Village
- Location in West Bengal, India Chaugacha (India)
- Coordinates: 23.0424°N 88.6154°E
- Country: India
- State: West Bengal
- District: Nadia

Population (2011)
  - Total: 8,603

Languages
  - Official: Bengali, English
- Time zone: UTC+5:30 (IST)
- PIN: 741509
- Telephone/STD code: 03454
- Lok Sabha constituency: Ranaghat
- Vidhan Sabha constituency: Chakdaha
- Website: nadia.gov.in

Chaugacha (also written as Chowgachha, Chaugachha) is a village in the Chakdaha CD block in the Kalyani subdivision of the Nadia district in the state of West Bengal, India.

== Geography ==
Chaugacha is located at 23.0424°N 88.6154°E.

== Demographics ==
According to the 2011 Census of India, Chaugachha had a total population of 8,603, of which 4,442 (52%) were males and 4,161 (48%) were females. Population in the age range 0–6 years was 837. The total number of literate persons in Chaugachha was 6,098 (78.52% of the population over 6 years).

== Education ==
Chowgacha Panu Gopal High School (H.S.) and Chowgachha Primary School are the two main educational institutions in Chaugachha. In addition to these, there are a few private kindergarten (KG) schools in the village that provide early childhood education.

A Few Notable Alumni of PG High School

1. Dr. Nayan Sarkar – Gynecologist
2. Dr. Nantu Acharjya – College Librarian
3. Mr. Ruhidas Sarkar – WBCS Officer

== Healthcare ==
Chaugacha Block Primary Health Centre, with 10 beds at Chaugacha, is the major government medical facility in the Chakdaha CD block.

== Market ==
There are two markets in the village: Puratan (Old) Bazar and Natun (New) Bazar. The daily bazar operates in the morning and evening. In addition, a weekly hat is held on Sundays and Thursdays at Puratan Bazar, beside the dighi (a large pond). Almost all essential goods are available in these markets.
