= Mohanpur, Nadia =

Mohanpur Harighata Farm
- Neighbourhood
- Location in West Bengal, India Mohanpur (India)
- Coordinates: 22.9428°N 88.5304°E
- Country: India
- State: West Bengal
- District: Nadia

Languages
  - Official: Bengali, English
- Time zone: UTC+5:30 (IST)
- PIN: 741246
- Telephone/STD code: 03216
- Lok Sabha constituency: Bangaon
- Vidhan Sabha constituency: Haringhata
- Website: nadia.gov.in

Mohanpur is a neighbourhood in the Haringhata CD block in the Kalyani subdivision of the Nadia district, West Bengal, India. This is presently known for the agricultural University and other educational institutes.

== Education ==
Bidhan Chandra Krishi Viswavidyalaya, Indian Institute of Science Education and Research Kolkata, All India Institute of Medical Sciences Kalyani and university college of West Bengal University of Technology are located at Mohanpur.
