= Haringhata (community development block) =

- Community development block
- Coordinates: 22.9538884°N 88.5637093°E
- Country: India
- State: West Bengal
- District: Nadia

Government
  - Type: Community development block

Area
  - Total: 170.32 km^{2} (65.76 sq mi)
- Elevation: 13 m (43 ft)

Population (2011)
  - Total: 231,068
  - Density: 1,356.7/km^{2} (3,513.8/sq mi)

Languages
  - Official: Bengali, English

Literacy (2011)
  - Total literates: 171,144 (82.15%)
- Time zone: UTC+5:30 (IST)
- PIN: 741249 (Subarnapur); 741252 (Krishivisyavidyalaya)
- Telephone/STD code: 03473
- Vehicle registration: WB-51, WB-52
- Lok Sabha constituency: Bangaon
- Vidhan Sabha constituency: Haringhata
- Website: nadia.nic.in

Haringhata is a community development block that forms an administrative division in Kalyani subdivision of Nadia district in the Indian state of West Bengal.

== Geography ==
Subarnapur is located at 22°57′14″N 88°33′49″E.

Haringhata CD Block is bounded by Chakdaha CD Block in the north and west, Bangaon and Gaighata CD Blocks, in North 24 Parganas district, in the east, Amdanga, Habra I and Habra II CD Blocks, in North 24 Parganas district, in the south.

Nadia district is mostly alluvial plains lying to the east of Hooghly River, locally known as Bhagirathi. The alluvial plains are cut across by such distributaries as Jalangi, Churni and Ichhamati. With these rivers getting silted up, floods are a recurring feature.

Haringhata CD Block has an area of 170.32 km^{2}. It has 1 panchayat samity, 10 gram panchayats, 176 gram sansads (village councils), 87 mouzas and 82 inhabited villages. Haringhata police station serves this block. Headquarters of this CD Block is at Subarnapur.

Gram panchayats of Haringhata block/ panchayat samiti are: Birohi 1, Birohi 2, Fatepur, Kastodanga 1, Kastodanga 2, Mollabelia, Nagarukhra 1 and Nagarukhra 2.

== Demographics ==
=== Population ===
As per the 2011 Census of India, Haringhata CD Block had a total population of 231,068, of which 207,459 were rural and 23,609 were urban. There were 118,709 (51% males and 112,359 (49%) females). Scheduled Castes numbered 73,755 (31.92%) and Scheduled Tribes numbered 11,218 (4.85%).

As per the 2001 census, Haringhata block had a total population 207,867, out of which 108,011 were males and 99,856 were females. Haringhata block registered a population growth of 16.92 per cent during the 1991-2001 decade. Decadal growth for the district was 19.51 per cent. Decadal growth in West Bengal was 17.84 per cent.

There are four census towns in Haringhata CD Block (2011 census figures in brackets) : Haringhata (3,989), Simhat (6,949), Subarnapur (5,759) and Digha (6,916). Haringhata, a census town at the time of 2011 census, was created a municipality in 2015.

Large villages (with 4,000+ population) in Haringhata CD Block were (2011 census figures in brackets): Chandirampur (4,740), Narayanpur (4,548), Uttar Datta Para (5,430), Uttar Brahmapur (5,371), Subuddipur (6,051), Sekendarpur (7,917), Kathdanga (7,417), Mollabalia (5,889), Ganguria (4,291), Fatepur (5,093), Barasat (4,046), Ukrah (13,548), Goaldob (4,883) and Dighalgram (5,390).

Other villages in Haringhata CD Block include (2011 census figures in brackets): Birohi (3,721).

=== Literacy ===
As per the 2011 census, the total number of literates in Haringhata CD Block was 171,144 (82.15% of the population over 6 years) out of which males numbered 93,313 (87.11% of the male population over 6 years) and females numbered 77,831 (76.90% of the female population over 6 years). The gender disparity (the difference between female and male literacy rates) was 10.21%.

See also – List of West Bengal districts ranked by literacy rate

Literacy in CD blocks of
Nadia district
Tehatta subdivision
Karimpur I – 67.70%
Karimpur II – 62.04%
Tehatta I – 70.72%
Tehatta II – 68.52%
Krishnanagar Sadar subdivision
Kaliganj – 65.89%
Nakashipara – 64.86%
Chapra – 68.25%
Krishnanagar I – 71.45%
Krishnanagar II – 68.52%
Nabadwip – 67.72%
Krishnaganj – 72.86%
Ranaghat subdivision
Hanskhali – 80.11%
Santipur – 73.10%
Ranaghat I – 77.61%
Ranaghat II – 79.38%
Kalyani subdivision
Chakdaha – 64.17%
Haringhata – 82.15%
Source: 2011 Census: CD Block Wise
Primary Census Abstract Data

=== Language and religion ===
Religion in Haringhata CD block (2011)
Hinduism	73.09%
Islam	26.19%
Other or not stated	0.72%

In the 2011 census, Hindus numbered 174,263 and formed 73.09% of the population in Haringhata CD Block. Muslims numbered 65,148 and formed 26.19% of the population. Christians numbered 460 and formed 0.20% of the population. Others numbered 1,197 and formed 0.52% of the population.

In the 2001 census, Hindus numbered 151,379 and formed 72.79% of the population of Haringhata CD Block. Muslims numbered 55,885 and formed 26.97% of the population. In the 1991 census, Hindus numbered 130,125 and formed 73.19% of the population of Haringhata CD Block. Muslims numbered 47,284 and formed 26.60% of the population.

Languages in Haringhata CD block (2011)
1. Bengali (96.0%)
2. Santali (1.65%)
3. Hindi (1.06%)
4. Others (1.29%)

At the time of the 2011 census, 96.00% of the population spoke Bengali, 1.65% Santali and 1.06% Hindi as their first language.

== Rural poverty ==
The District Human Development Report for Nadia has provided a CD Block-wise data table for Modified Human Vulnerability Index of the district. Haringhata CD Block registered 31.59 on the MHPI scale. The CD Block-wise mean MHVI was estimated at 33.92. A total of 8 out of the 17 CD Blocks in Nadia district were found to be severely deprived when measured against the CD Block mean MHVI - Karimpur I and Karimpur II (under Tehatta subdivision), Kaliganj, Nakashipara, Chapra, Krishnanagar I and Nabadwip (under Krishnanagar Sadar subdivision) and Santipur (under Ranaghat subdivision) appear to be backward.

As per the Human Development Report 2004 for West Bengal, the rural poverty ratio in Nadia district was 28.35%. The estimate was based on Central Sample data of NSS 55th round 1999–2000.

== Economy ==
=== Livelihood ===
In Haringhata CD Block in 2011, amongst the class of total workers, cultivators formed 18.42%, agricultural labourers 35.60, household industry workers 3.79% and other workers 42.19%.

The southern part of Nadia district starting from Krishnanagar I down to Chakdaha and Haringhata has some urban pockets specialising in either manufacturing or service related economic activity and has reflected a comparatively higher concentration of population but the urban population has generally stagnated. Nadia district still has a large chunk of people living in the rural areas.

=== Infrastructure ===
There are 82 inhabited villages in Haringhata CD Block. 100% villages have power supply and drinking water supply. 13 Villages (15.85%) have post offices. All 82 villages (100%) have telephones (including landlines, public call offices and mobile phones). 64 villages (78.05%) have a pucca approach road and 30 villages (38.59%) have transport communication (includes bus service, rail facility and navigable waterways). 6 villages (7.32%) have agricultural credit societies and 8 villages (9.76%) have banks. It should, however, be noted that although 100% villages in Nadia district had power supply in 2011, a survey in 2007-08 revealed that less than 50% of households had electricity connection. In rural areas of the country, the tube well was for many years considered to be the provider of safe drinking water, but with arsenic contamination of ground water claiming public attention it is no longer so. Piped water supply is still a distant dream. In 2007–08, the availability of piped drinking water in Nadia district was as low as 8.6%, well below the state average of around 20%.

=== Agriculture ===
Persons engaged in agriculture
in Haringhata CD Block
1. Bargadars (2.44%)
2. Patta holders (7.95%)
3. Small farmers (6.18%)
4. Marginal farmers (33.5%)
5. Agricultural labourers (49.9%)

Although the Bargadari Act of 1950 recognised the rights of bargadars to a higher share of crops from the land that they tilled, it was not implemented fully. Large tracts, beyond the prescribed limit of land ceiling, remained with the rich landlords. From 1977 onwards major land reforms took place in West Bengal. Land in excess of land ceiling was acquired and distributed amongst the peasants. Following land reforms land ownership pattern has undergone transformation. In 2013–14, persons engaged in agriculture in Haringhata CD Block could be classified as follows: bargadars 2.44%, patta (document) holders 7.95%, small farmers (possessing land between 1 and 2 hectares) 6.18%, marginal farmers (possessing land up to 1 hectare) 33.53% and agricultural labourers 49.09%. As the proportion of agricultural labourers is very high, the real wage in the agricultural sector has been a matter of concern.

Haringhata CD Block had 207 fertiliser depots, 40 seed store and 44 fair price shops in 2013–14.

In 2013–14, Haringhata CD Block produced 72,866 tonnes of Aman paddy, the main winter crop from 24,942 hectares, 20,348 tonnes of Boro paddy (spring crop) from 5,720 hectares, 5,413 tonnes of Aus paddy (summer crop) from 2,013 hectares, 4,317 tonnes of wheat from 1,315 hectares, 42,799 tonnes of jute from 2,383 hectares and 16,616 tonnes of potatoes from 536 hectares. It also produced pulses and oilseeds.

In 2013–14, the total area irrigated in Haringhata CD Block was 967 hectares, out of which 89 hectares were irrigated by river lift irrigation, 830 hectares by deep tube wells and 48 hectares by shallow tube wells.

=== Haringhata Dairy Farm ===
In order to supply milk to the urban population in West Bengal, the first dairy plant was installed in 1950 at Haringhata by the Directorate of Dairy Development, under the aegis of Animal Resources Development Department, Government of West Bengal. It started with a production of 1.5 thousand litres of bottled milk per day in 1950–51. With a network of two dairy plants, seven milk colony units and 19 Milk Collection-cum-Chilling stations named as "Greater Calcutta Milk Supply Scheme" the production had gradually gone up to 210 thousand litres per day by 1980s. Directorate of Dairy Development, under the aegis of Animal Resources Development Department, Govt. of West Bengal.

=== Banking ===
In 2013–14, Haringhata CD Block had offices of 12 commercial banks and 2 gramin banks.

== Transport ==
Haringhata CD Block has 4 originating/ terminating bus services. The nearest station is Kanchrapara railway station which is 16 km and Kalyani Railway Station is 19 km from CD Block headquarters.

NH 12 (old number NH 34) passes through this block.

SH 1, running from Bangaon (in North 24 Parganas district) to Kulpi (in South 24 Parganas district) passes through this CD Block.

== Education ==
In 2013–14, Haringhata CD Block had 120 primary schools with 9,251 students, 11 middle schools with 866 students, 3 high schools with 1,819 students and 18 higher secondary schools with 23,167 students. Haringhata CD Block had 1 general college with 3,233 students, 2 technical/ professional institutions with 1,880 students and 453 institutions for special and non-formal education with 10,874 students

In Haringhata CD Block, amongst the 82 inhabited villages, 4 villages did not have any school, 21 had more than 1 primary school, 16 had at least 1 primary and one middle school and 14 had 1 middle school and 1 secondary school.

== Healthcare ==
In 2014, Haringhata CD Block had 1 rural hospital, 4 primary health centres and 2 private nursing homes with total 96 beds and 9 doctors (excluding private bodies). It had 30 family welfare subcentres. 4,907 patients were treated indoor and 357,557 patients were treated outdoor in the hospitals, health centres and subcentres of the CD Block.

Haringhata Rural Hospital, with 25 beds at Mohanpur, is the major government medical facility in the Haringhata CD block. There are primary health centres at Birohi (with 6 beds), Kastadanga (with 6 beds) and Nagarukhra (with 10 beds).

Haringhata CD Block is one of the areas of Nadia district where ground water is affected by high level of arsenic contamination. The WHO guideline for arsenic in drinking water is 10 mg/ litre, and the Indian Standard value is 50 mg/ litre. All the 17 blocks of Nadia district have arsenic contamination above this level. The maximum concentration in Haringhata CD Block is 865 mg/litre.
