= Darappur =

- Census Town
- Location in West Bengal, India Darappur (India)
- Coordinates: 23.0709°N 88.6508°E
- Country: India
- State: West Bengal
- District: Nadia

Area
  - Total: 2.56 km^{2} (0.99 sq mi)

Population (2011)
  - Total: 8,275
  - Density: 3,230/km^{2} (8,370/sq mi)

Languages
  - Official: Bengali, English
- Time zone: UTC+5:30 (IST)
- Vehicle registration: WB
- Website: nadia.nic.in

Darappur is a census town in the Chakdaha CD block in the Kalyani subdivision of the Nadia district in the state of West Bengal, India.

== Geography ==
=== Location ===
Darappur is located at 23.0709°N 88.6508°E.

Nadia district is mostly alluvial plains lying to the east of Hooghly River, locally known as Bhagirathi. The alluvial plains are cut across by such distributaries as Jalangi, Churni and Ichhamati. With these rivers getting silted up, floods are a recurring feature.≠

== Demographics ==
According to the 2011 Census of India, Darappur had a total population of 8,275, of which 4,307 (52%) were males and 3,968 (48%) were females. Population in the age range 0–6 years was 755. The total number of literate persons in Darappur was 5,766 (76.68% of the population over 6 years).

As of 2001 India census, Darappur had a population of 7732. Males constitute 52% of the population and females 48%. Darappur has an average literacy rate of 58%, lower than the national average of 59.5%: male literacy is 66% and, female literacy is 49%. In Darappur, 13% of the population is under 6 years of age.

== Infrastructure ==
According to the District Census Handbook 2011, Nadia, Darappur covered an area of 2.56 km^{2}. Among the civic amenities, the protected water supply involved overhead tank, tubewell/ borewell, hand pump. It had 743 domestic electric connections. Among the medical facilities, it had 5 medicine shops. Among the educational facilities it had 1 primary school, 3 middle schools, 1 senior secondary school .
