= Ratna Ghosh Kar =

Indian politician

Ratna Ghosh Kar (born 1965) is an Indian politician from West Bengal. She is a former member of the West Bengal Legislative Assembly from Chakdaha Assembly constituency in Nadia district. She was elected in the 2016 West Bengal Legislative Assembly election representing the All India Trinamool Congress.

== Early life and education ==
Ghosh is from Haringhata, Ndia district, West Bengal. She married Kishori Mohan Kar. He is a businessman, who runs a medical shop. She completed her MA in Bengali at Burdwan University in 1992.

== Career ==
Ghosh was first elected as an MLA from Chakdaha Assembly constituency representing the All India Trinamool Congress in the 2016 West Bengal Legislative Assembly election. She polled 94,241 votes and defeated her nearest rival, Biswanath Gupta of the Communist Party of India (Marxist), by a margin of 23,653 votes.

In 2019, in a controversial statement, she allegedly asked the cadre to chase away the central forces. She allegedly requested the Mahila Morcha members to pick up brooms and chase away the jawans. She was a minister and her video went viral.
