= Bidhan Chandra Krishi Viswavidyalaya =

Public Agricultural University in West Bengal, India

- বিধানচন্দ্র কৃষি বিশ্ববিদ্যালয়
- Motto: jñānena trādūdhyātām sītā
- Motto in English: May Sita be protected by knowledge
- Type: Public Agricultural University
- Established: September 1, 1974; 51 years ago
- Accreditation: ICAR
- Academic affiliations: UGC; AIU
- Budget: ₹163.83 crore (US$17 million) (2024-25 est.)
- Chancellor: Governor of West Bengal
- Vice-Chancellor: Ashok Kumar Patra
- Faculty: 214 (2025)
- Students: 1,711 (2025)
- Undergraduates: 1,089 (2025)
- Postgraduates: 339 (2025)
- Doctoral students: 283 (2025)
- Location: Mohanpur, West Bengal, India; 22°56′42.88″N 88°32′0.86″E
- Campus: Rural
- Website: www.bckv.edu.in

Bidhan Chandra Krishi Viswavidyalaya (BCKV), also known as Bidhan Chandra Agricultural University, is an agricultural university in West Bengal, India. The university aims to provide higher education in theoretical and technical fields of Agriculture, Horticulture and Agricultural Engineering. It grants Bachelor of Science, Master of Science, Bachelor of Technology, Master of Technology and Doctorate degrees.

== Campus ==
The university has a well planned campus of magnificent aesthetics. It features well distributed greenery of decorative, educational and medicinal importance, has its own Medicinal & Aromatic Plants' Garden between the main building of the Faculty of Agriculture & the way to the Central Library.

All the faculty buildings, special purpose isolated laboratories, workshops and hostels are well connected through roads and at the center lies the Administrative Building. Each hostel is no more than a five-minute walk from the center area of the campus.

The campus is shared with the Faculty of Dairy Technology, West Bengal University of Animal & Fishery Sciences and the Indian Institute of Science Education and Research, Kolkata (IISER-K). A beautiful foot-bridge over a lake connects the IISER-K campus with the BCKV main campus. Several gates are available to enter into the main campus, shared IISER-K campus, hostels, Jagulia farm or Mondouri Teaching Farm as need basis. The campus houses a cafeteria, several canteens, a health centre, Xerox centers and a book shop.

The nearest railway station is Kanchrapara, roughly 8 km from the main campus connecting Sealdah and Howrah by rail. The National Highway 34 passes within 1 km from it, connecting 50 km away Kolkata by road.

This university has 2 different sub-campuses.

1. College of Agriculture, Burdwan.
2. College of Agriculture, Susunia, Bankura.

== Organisation and administration ==
=== Governance ===
The chancellor is the Governor of West Bengal. The vice-chancellor as the chief executive of the university is supported by the registrar in administration, comptroller in financial management, deans of academic activities of the faculties, and directors for management of research and extension activities in agriculture, horticulture, and agricultural engineering. The vice-chancellor's secretariat is staffed with a secretary to the vice-chancellor, one superintendent, two clerical assistants and seven office attendants are a supportive unit in functioning the office.

=== Faculties ===
==== Faculty of Agriculture ====
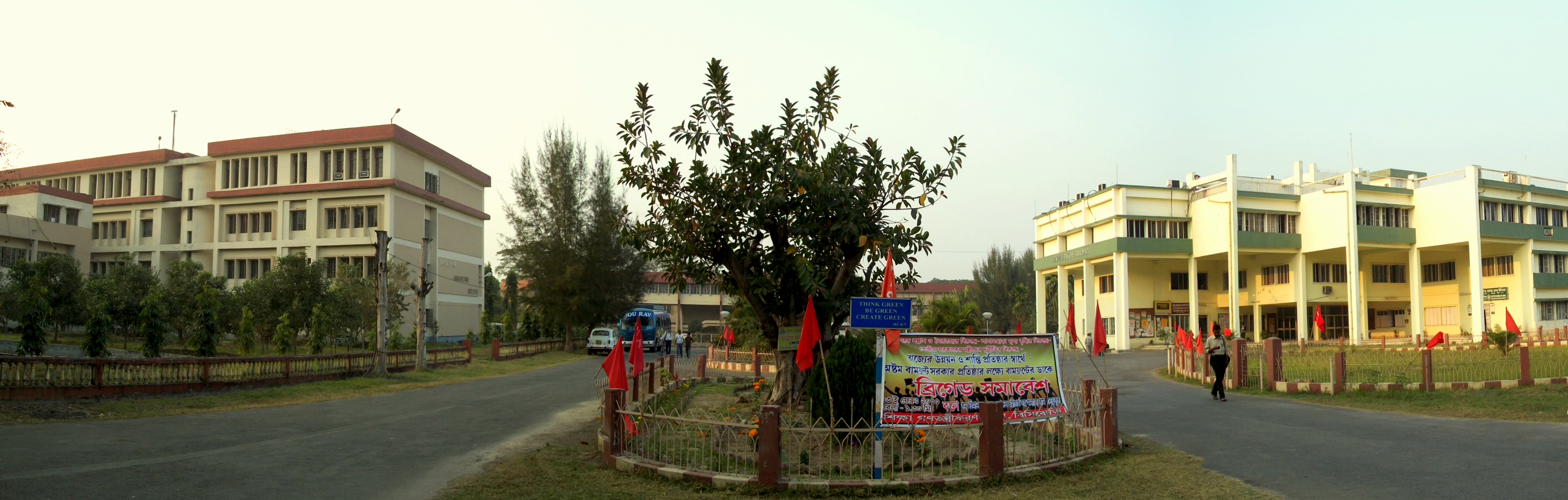
A panoramic view of the BCKV campus, just entering the main gate, on the left it is the Faculty of Agriculture building. On the right is the Administrative Building of the university.

The Faculty of Agriculture consisted of 17 departments, which has recently been reduced to 16 by merging two departments into one, all with specializations in teaching, research and extension for the development of agriculture in this state. One hundred students are admitted each year in the undergraduate courses on the basis of their performance at higher secondary (10+2) level. Apart from the general agricultural subjects, during 7th semester students take Rural Agricultural Working Experience (RAWE) & Experimental Learning Programme (ELP) in 8th semester.

Departments of this faculty
- Agronomy
- Agricultural Chemistry & Soil Science
- Agricultural Entomology
- Agricultural Chemicals
- Agriculture Biotechnology
- Soil & Water Conservation
- Plant Pathology
- Agricultural Meteorology & Physics
- Agricultural Extension
- Agricultural Statistics
- Agricultural Economics
- Genetics & Plant Breeding
- Plant Physiology
- Animal Science
- Agricultural Biochemistry
- Seed Science & Technology

==== Faculty of Horticulture ====
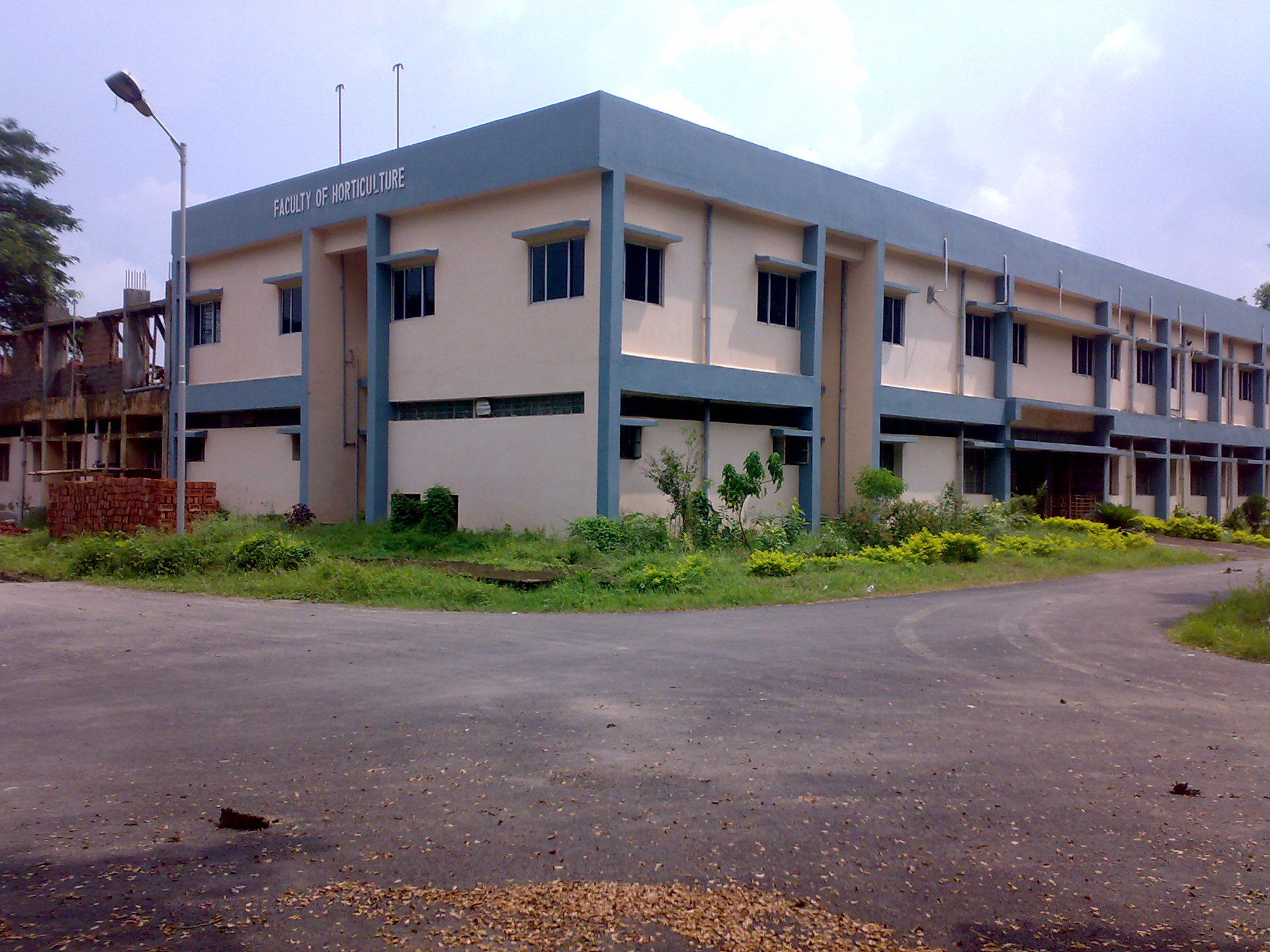
Faculty of Hort. BCKV

The Faculty of Horticulture was established in 1996. The objective of creation of the faculty was to initiate education and training in horticulture, to conduct need-based research for the development of horticulture in West Bengal, and to disseminate the technology for growing horticultural crops and post harvest management of produce.

Initially the faculty functioned with very limited space in the Faculty of Agriculture. Now it is housed in the newly constructed faculty building at Mohanpur. The instructional facilities include one horticultural farm at Mondouri and one nursery at Jagulia. The UG classes are held at Jagulia where a small instructional farm is maintained. The 150-acre farm at Mondouri that is the Horticultural Research Station provides facilities for practical and project works of M.Sc. and Ph.D. students for all the departments under this faculty.

Departments of this faculty
- Department of Floriculture & Landscaping
- Department of Fruits & Orchard Management
- Department of Post Harvest Technology
- Department of Spices & Plantation Crops
- Department of Vegetable Crops

==== Faculty of Agricultural Engineering ====
Departments of this faculty
- Farm Machinery & Power
- Soil and Water Engineering
- Post Harvest Engineering
- Food Engineering

M.Tech. and Ph.D. programmes are available in Department of Farm Machinery & Power, Department of Soil and Water Engineering and Department of Food Engineering.

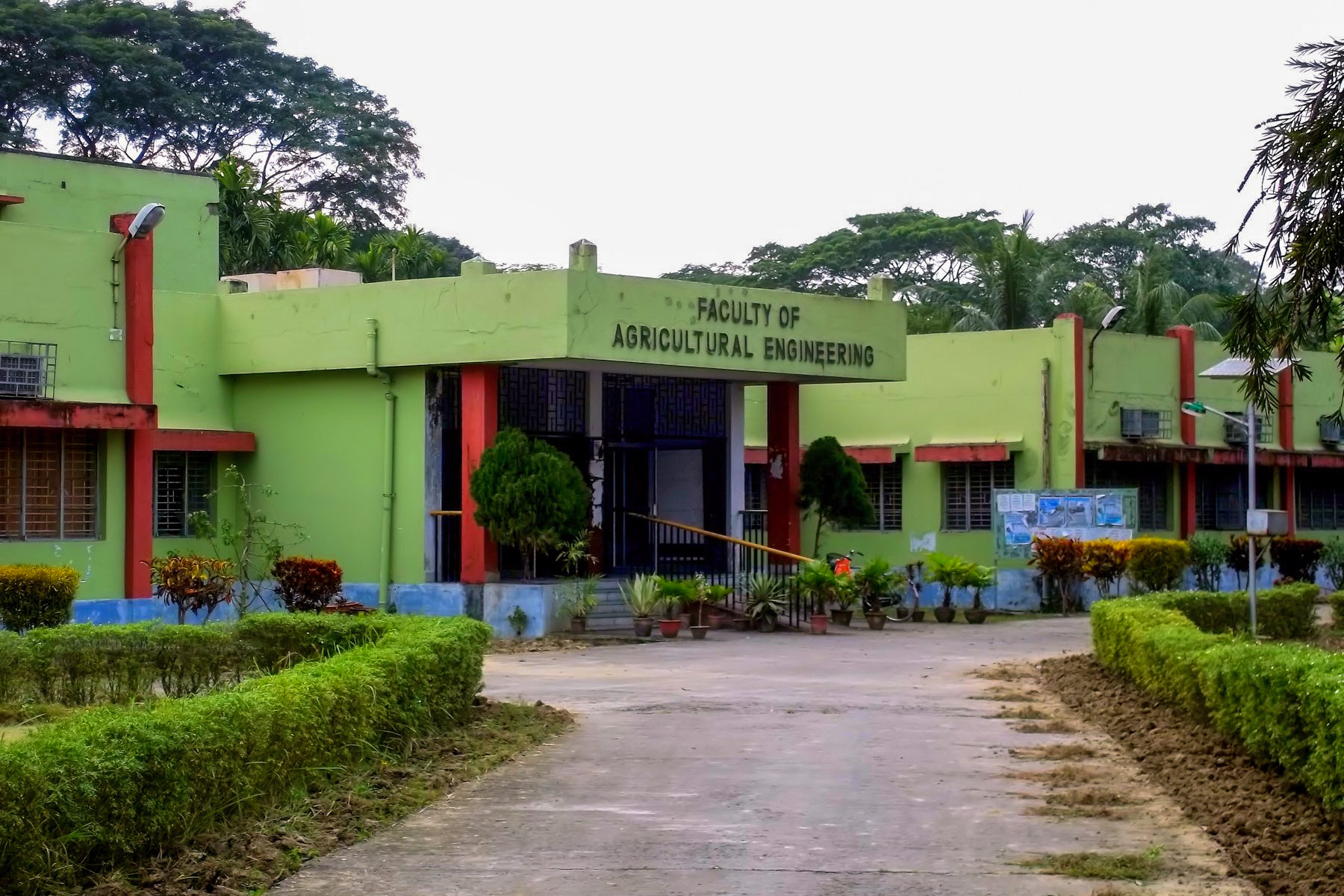
Faculty of Agricultural Engineering, BCKV

=== Directorate of Research ===
The Directorate of Research at Kalyani is the coordinating–monitoring headquarters of the research stations, sub-stations, units, sub-units and projects spread over the jurisdiction of the viswavidyalaya. A substantial number of research projects under programmes and funding modes operate on farmers’ fields (on-farm trials, FLD trials) at three major agro-climatic regions of the state and at other zones across West Bengal. Several experiments are conducted in a scientist–farmer participatory manner.

=== Directorate of Extension Education ===
The Directorate of Extension Education, in the Bidhan Chandra Krishi Viswavidyalaya, was created in 1994 through upgrading the Field Extension Wing, which took care of mainly the farm advisory services among a few villages surrounding the headquarters campus of the Viswavidyalaya. The upgrade attempt, though initiated late, was made in line with the mandate of the SAUs to organize "first line extension" activities to complement their research and education role, as well as to strengthen the efforts of the state extension machinery towards transferring proven and tested technological options for increased production and productivity. However, the manpower, as well as the infrastructure, corresponding to the enlargement of the mandated roles and responsibilities assumed by the directorate, consequent to its upgrade, continued to remain inadequate.

The roles and responsibilities of the Directorate of Extension Education were enlarged to accommodate the recommendations of the Randhawa Committee (1978) and the National Commission on Agriculture (1976). These recommendations, inter-alta, suggested a complementary role for the education and research for organizing the extension functions through the following sets of interrelated activities:

- Technology Refinement and Upgradation
- Technology Integration
- Publication, Demonstration & Information Assistance
- Participatory Techniques for Research and Extension
- Training Module Development
- Capacity Building

=== Directorate of Farms ===
The Directorate of Farms functions in the realm of agricultural research, education, and extension. The directorate has 1340.6 acres of land distributed in 12 farms. Its activities are listed below:

- Support to research activities of AICRPs/AINPs and dissertation work of students.
- Quality seed production. It was responsible for the production and distribution of 236 tonnes of quality seeds (Foundation/Certified/TL) of paddy, wheat, oilseeds and pulses during 2006-07 crop seasons of West Bengal.
- Supervises production of planting materials of mango, cashew, ber and sweet orange at the RRS, Red & Laterite Zone, Jhargram, Paschim Medinipur, West Bengal.
- Maintenance of eco-friendly farms (6.00 ha) as well as one field conservatory of germplasms of non-conventional crops (like vanilla, pepper, ekangi, spices and medicinal crops, etc.) at the RRS, New Alluvial Zone, Gayeshpur, Nadia, West Bengal.
- Monitoring of an experimental tea garden yielding good quality leaves at the RRS, New Alluvial Zone, Gayeshpur, Nadia, West Bengal.

== Academics ==
=== Central Library ===
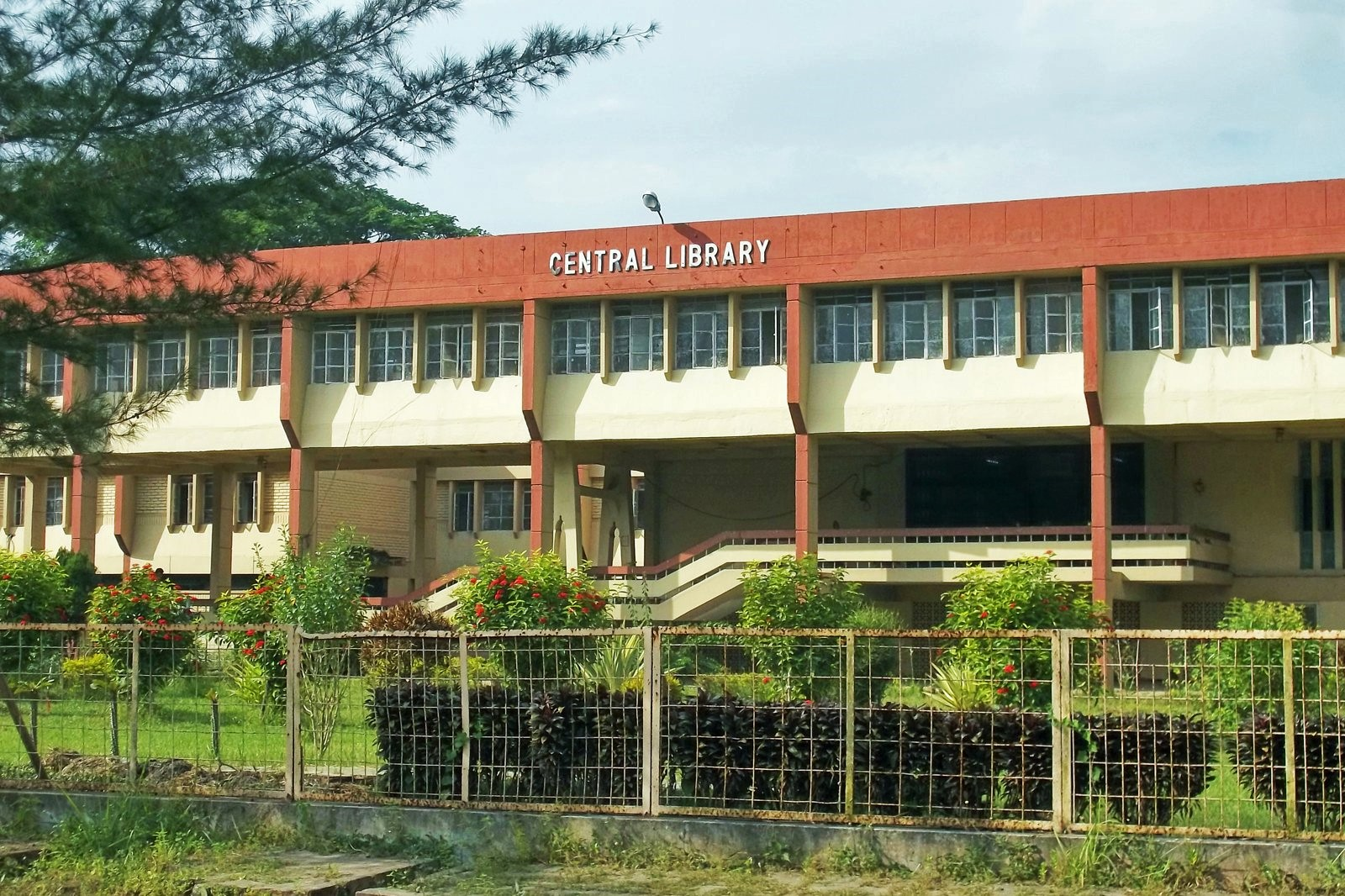
Central Library BCKV

The Central Library at Mohanpur, Main campus was inaugurated in 1980. It is housed in a four storied building encompassing 5575 sq. m. floor space with a plan area of 7242 sq. m. The library renders services through manual and IT-based systems. Apart from serving as a Book Bank the library also provides Online Public Access Catalogue (OPAC).

=== Placement Cell ===
A fully equipped and proficient placement centre is being housed in the campus for the convenience of their graduating students. This year-round placement activity involves students in interactive counseling sessions with members of the placement cell to ensure their gainful placement in jobs before they leave the university.

=== Rankings and reputation ===
Domestically the university ranked 13th among Agriculture and Allied Sectors Institutions by National Institutional Ranking Framework (NIRF) in 2024.

== Student life ==
The students are known as "BCKVians" in general.

=== Accommodation ===
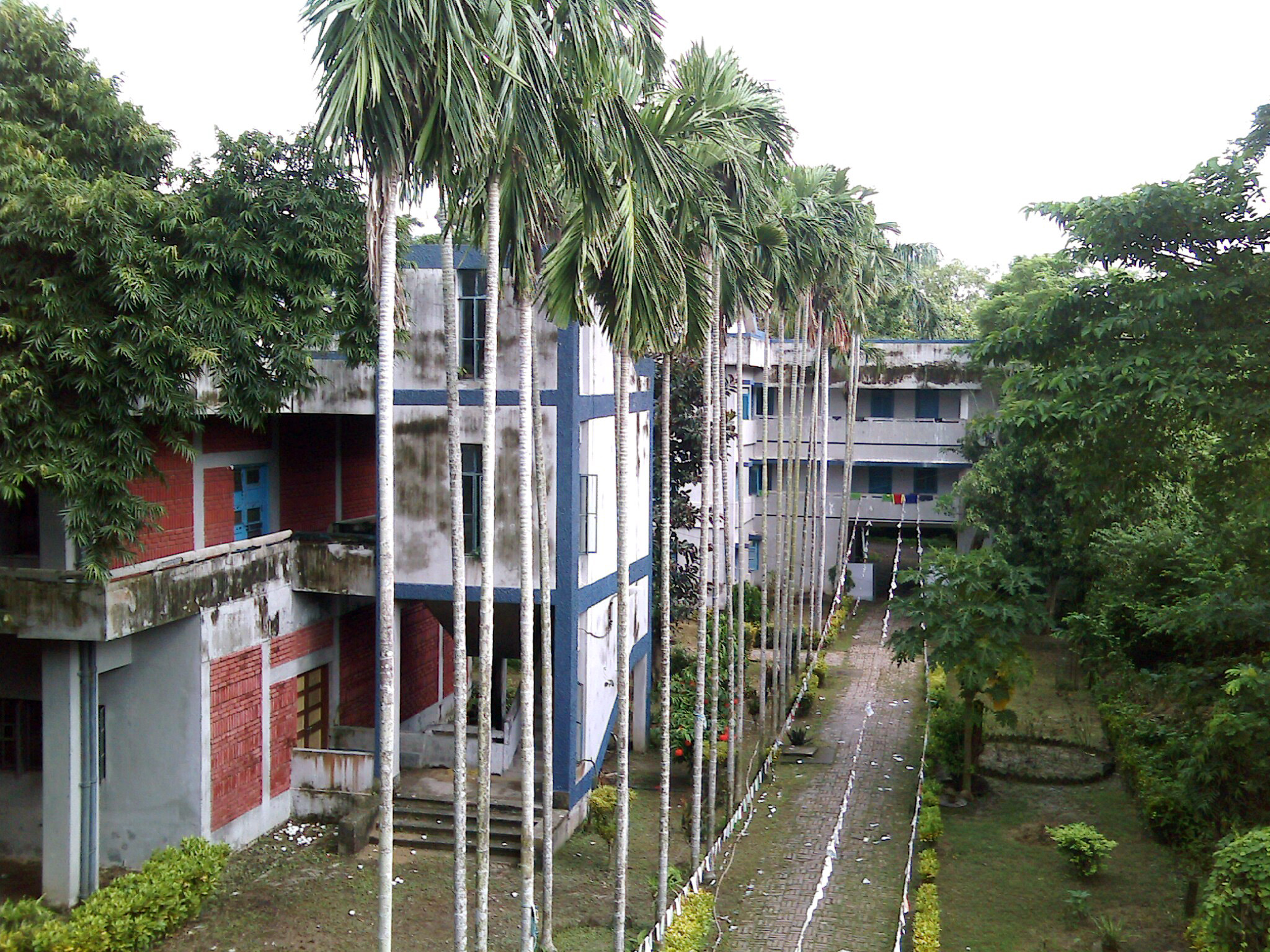
Raman Abas; previously Sir CV Raman Hall

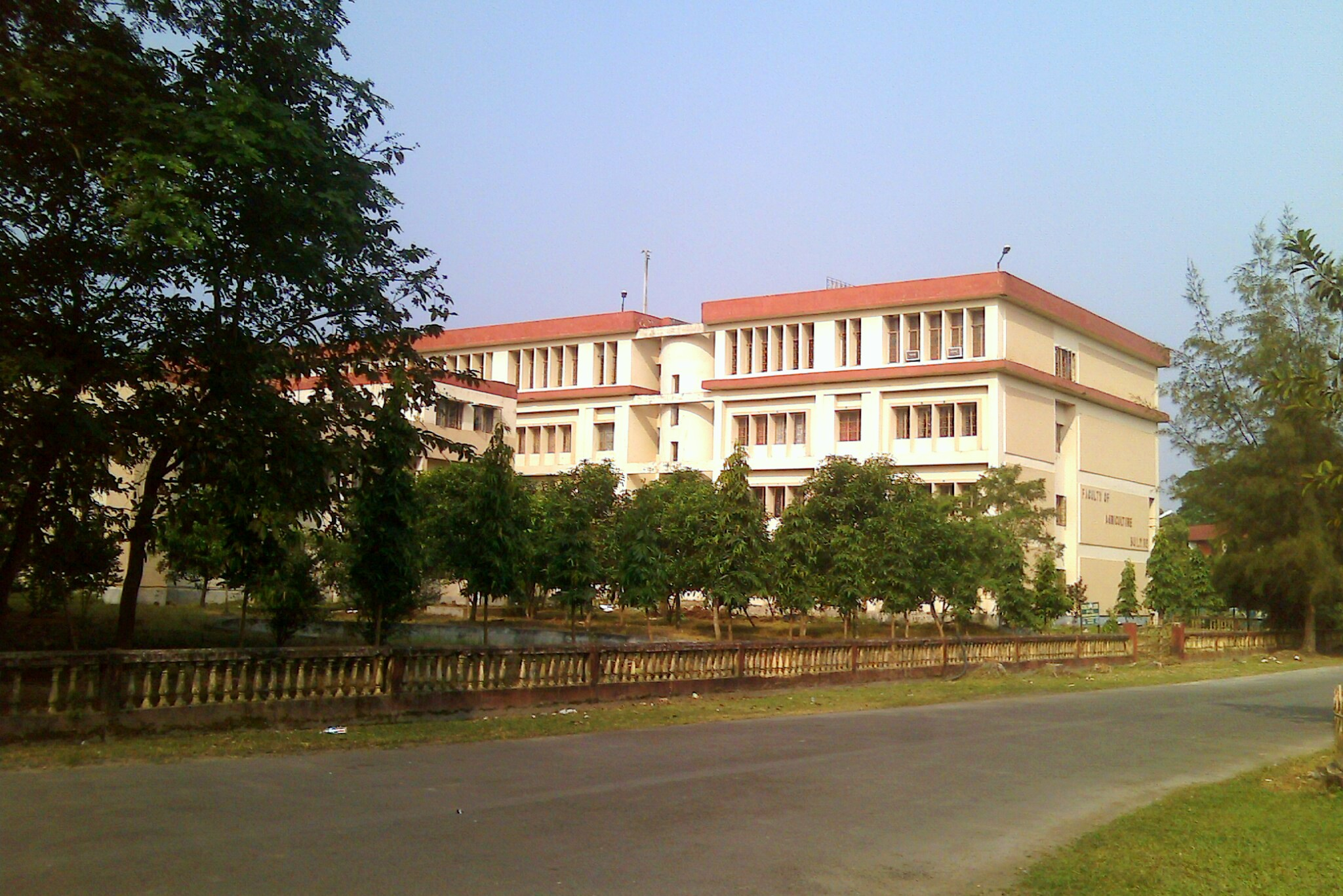
Way to Faculty of Ag. BCKV

The student circle of this university is mainly hostel oriented, with very few students from nearby Haringhata, Kanchrapara & Kalyani each year of UG and PG, called Dayscholars. The majority of students as Hostellers belong to the different parts of the state, the country, even international students. There are several hostels according to criteria for accommodation inside the university campus.

- Raman Abas (UG Men's Hostel)
- Sir JC Bose Hall (UG Men's Hostel)
- Vidyasagar Hall (PG Men's Hostel)
- Rabindra Abas (PG Men's Hostel)
- Matangini Abas (Ladies' Hostel I)
- Ladies' Hostel V
- International Students' Hostel

All the hostels have good study environments along with dining halls and common rooms featuring carrom boards, table tennis, magazines and newspapers, widescreen LCD TVs etc. for leisure hours. The hostels are being planned WiFi or Broadband connections for students.

=== Central Students Union ===
The university has three Students Unions for three faculties, which run unitedly as a form of Central Students Union (CSU or simply SU). It deals with every relevant issue of the students starting from education, research, welfare to job-oriented problems.

=== Activities ===
- Different indoor & outdoor games' competition.
- Year round cultural programs: Nabarun - Ek notun alor udvash (Freshers' Welcome), Naihrit - Ek sangoskritik nobodigonto (Annual Social Function), Nisorgo - Mukhomukhi bosibar tore sesh bela (Farewell) & Conchorrenza - Intra University Cultural Competition.
- Debates, lectures and seminars on different social and educational issues.
- Campus cleaning & tree plantation program.
- Inter University Quiz Competition.
- Cine show.
- Conducting movements for uplift of educational, hostel and welfare facilities and for job oriented problems.

=== Services ===
- Cheap store: Students can buy their daily required articles at 20% rebate from these cheap stores of different hostels.
- Benevolent fund: SU provides financial support to the poor students through this fund.
- Academic cell: This is a study cum information cell which provides the students with valuable information regarding syllabi of different State and National level examinations like JRF, NET, CAT, WBCS etc., and also the study materials for those examinations along with general agriculture.
- Students Union Library: Students get the opportunity of having fantastic literal collection and articles from this. Every member of SU is the member of this library.
- Gymnasium: All the interested students have easy & free of cost access to this multi-instrument gym.

== Notable alumni ==
- Kanishka Bhunia, Assistant Professor of Food Process Engineering at Department of Agricultural and Food Engineering IIT Kharagpur
- Kaustuv Sanyal, Molecular biologist, N-BIOS laureate
- Tapas Kumar Kundu, Molecular biologist, Shanti Swarup Bhatnagar and N-BIOS laureate
- Tirthankar Roy, Hydrologist at Department of Civil and Environmental Engineering at the University of Nebraska-Lincoln
- Utpal Nath, Molecular geneticist at Indian Institute of Science Bangalore
- Satarupa Sanyal, filmmaker

== Gallery ==
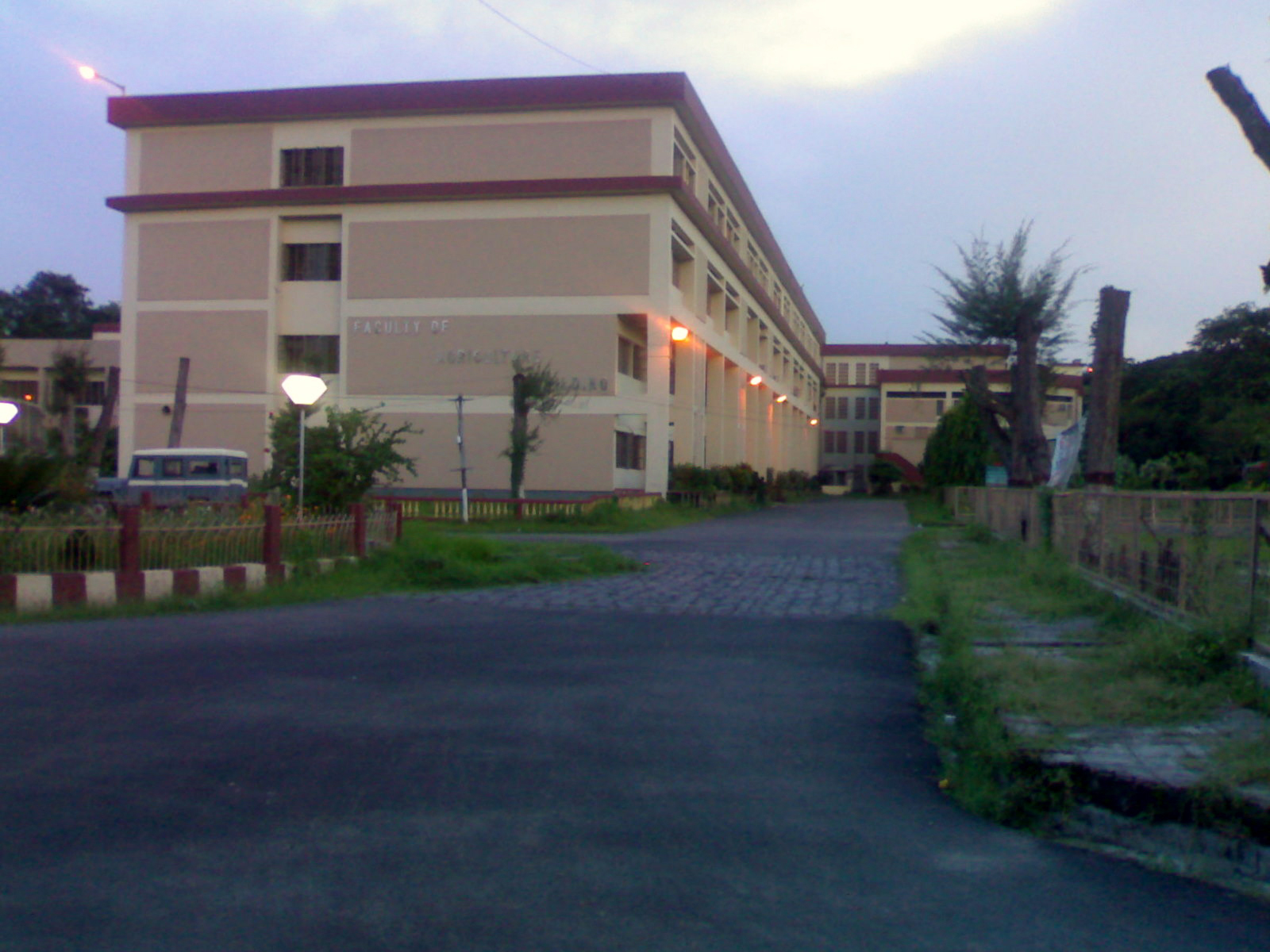
The Faculty of Agriculture, BCKV, in the evening.

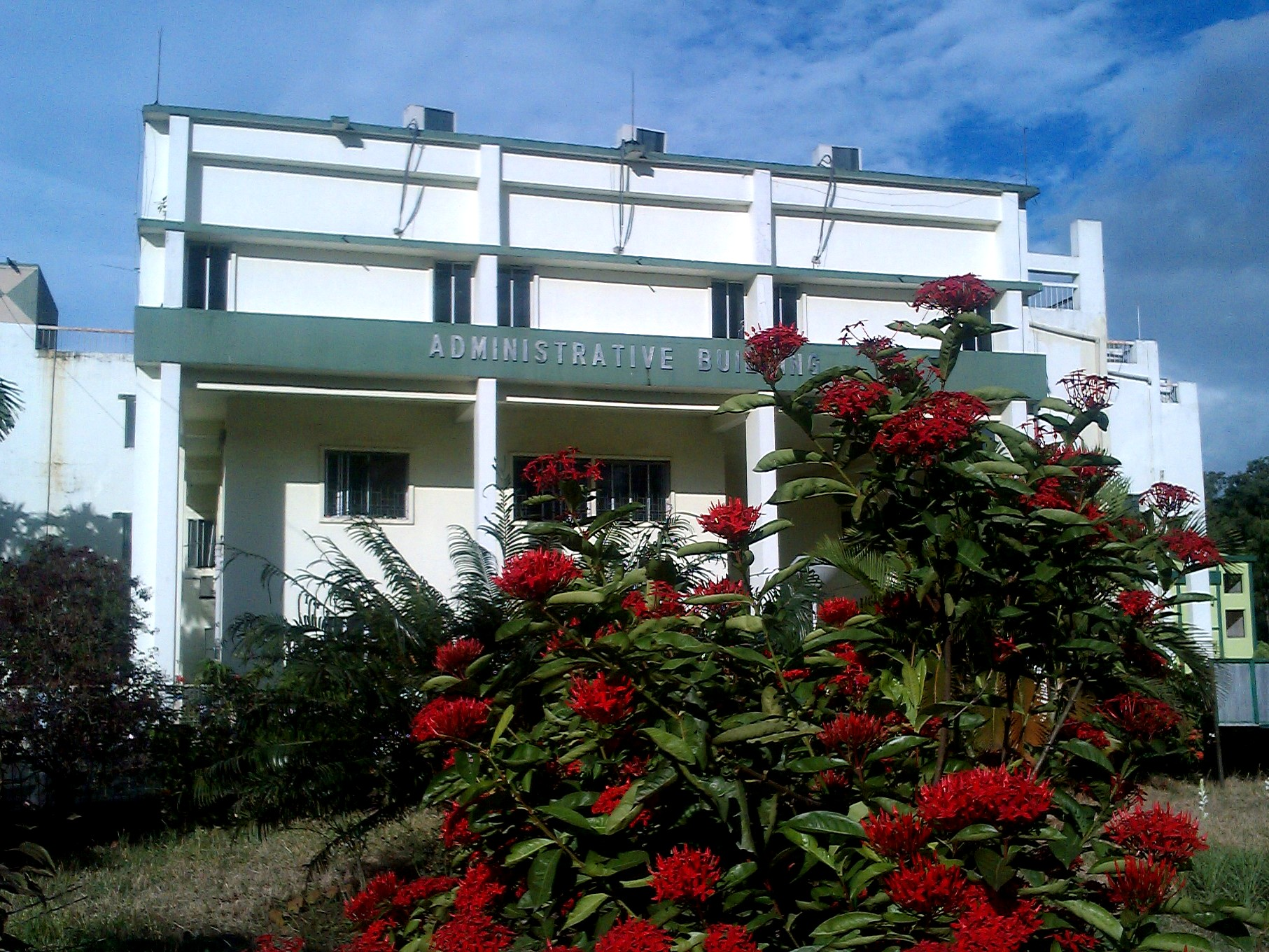
The Administrative Building, BCKV.

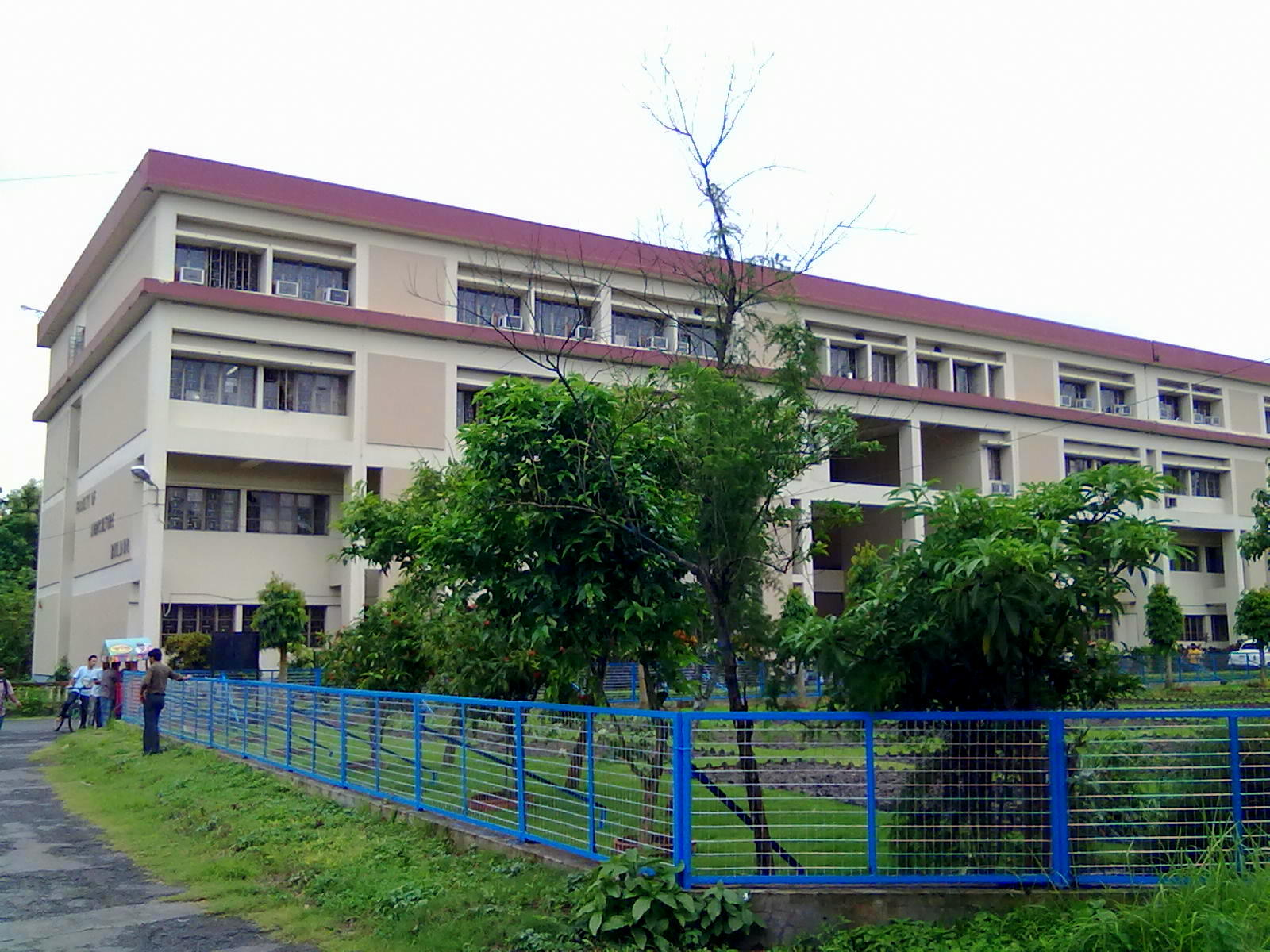
Faculty of Ag. BCKV.

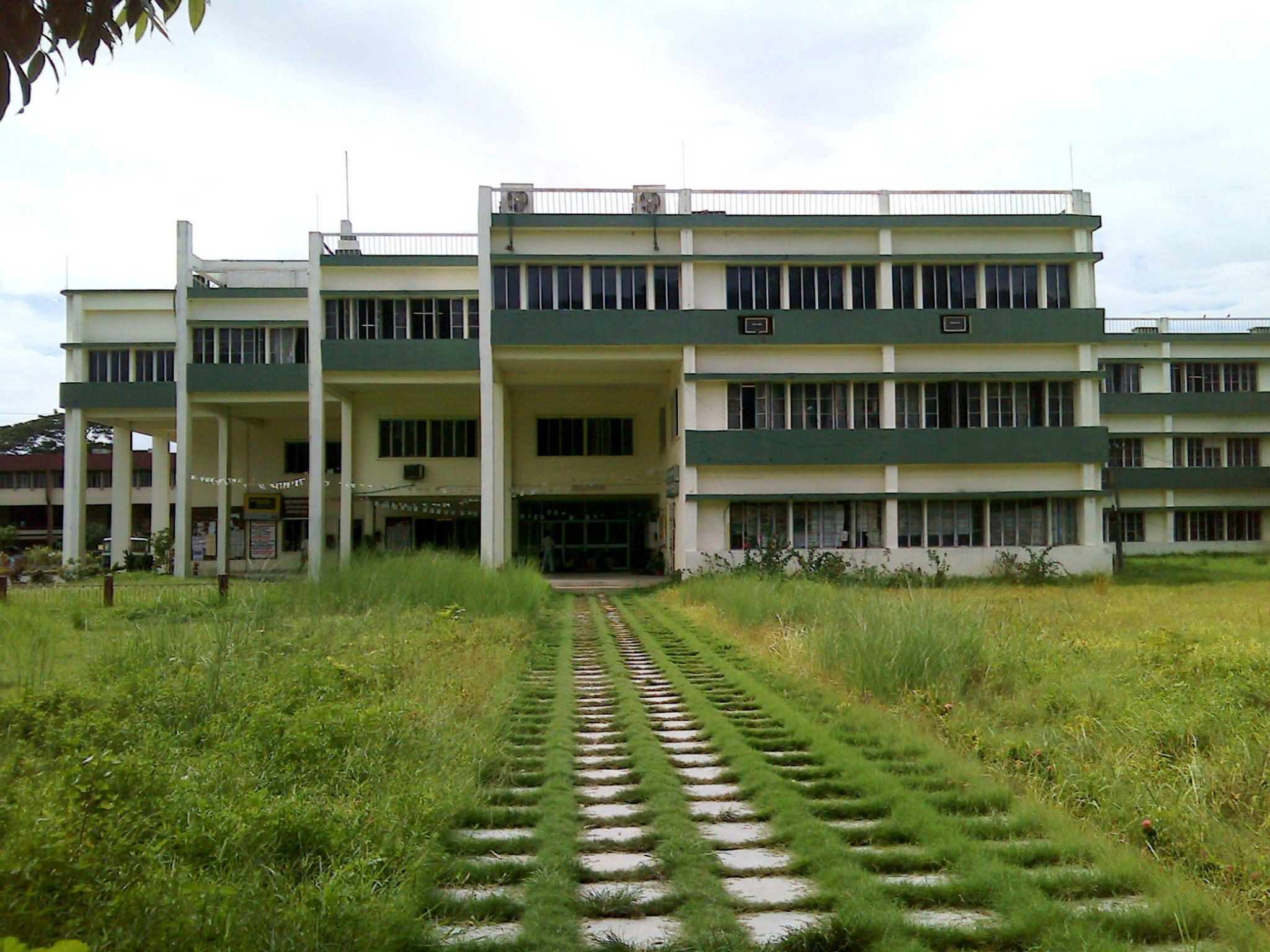
Administrative Building Lawn.

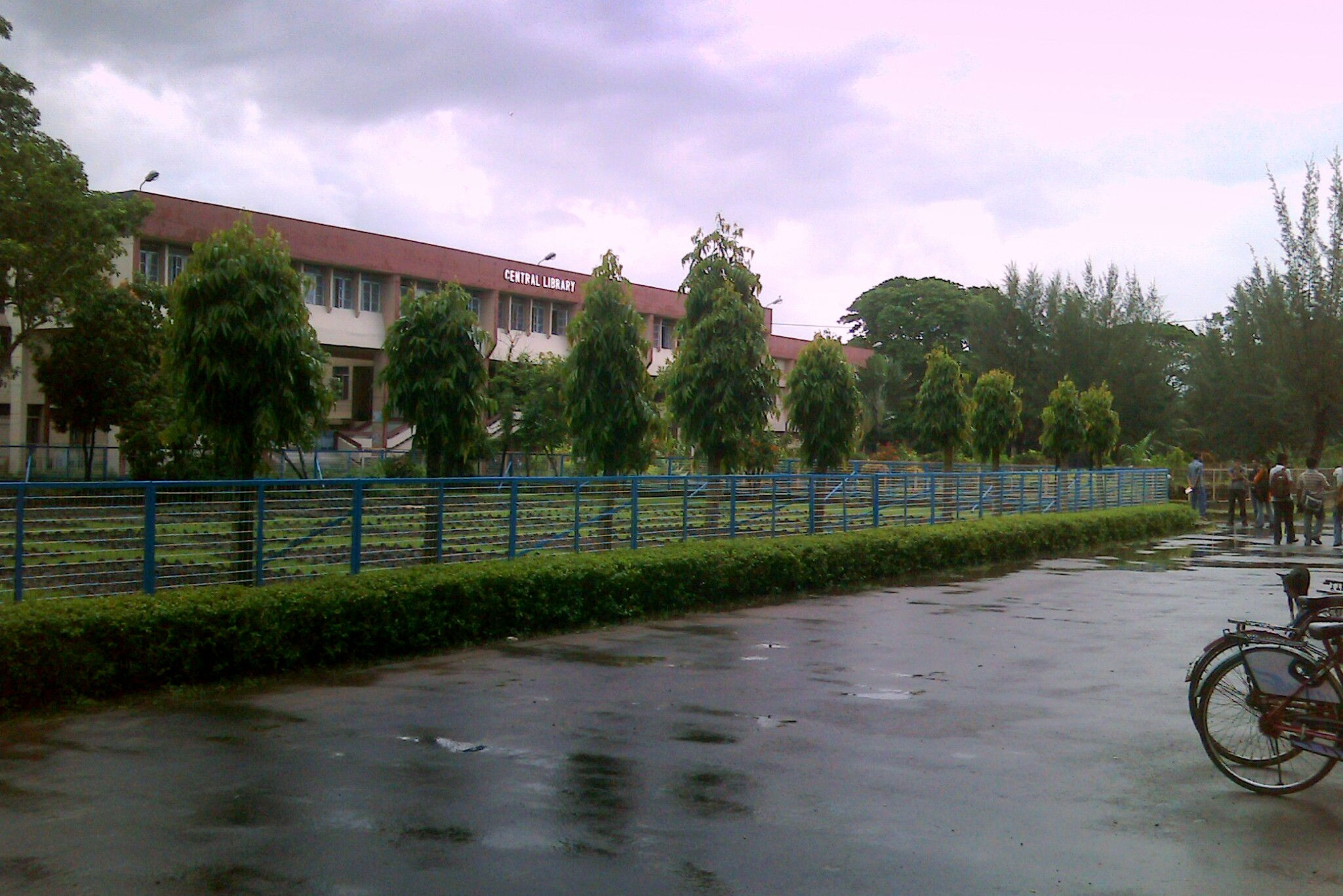
A Rainy Day Campus of BCKV.

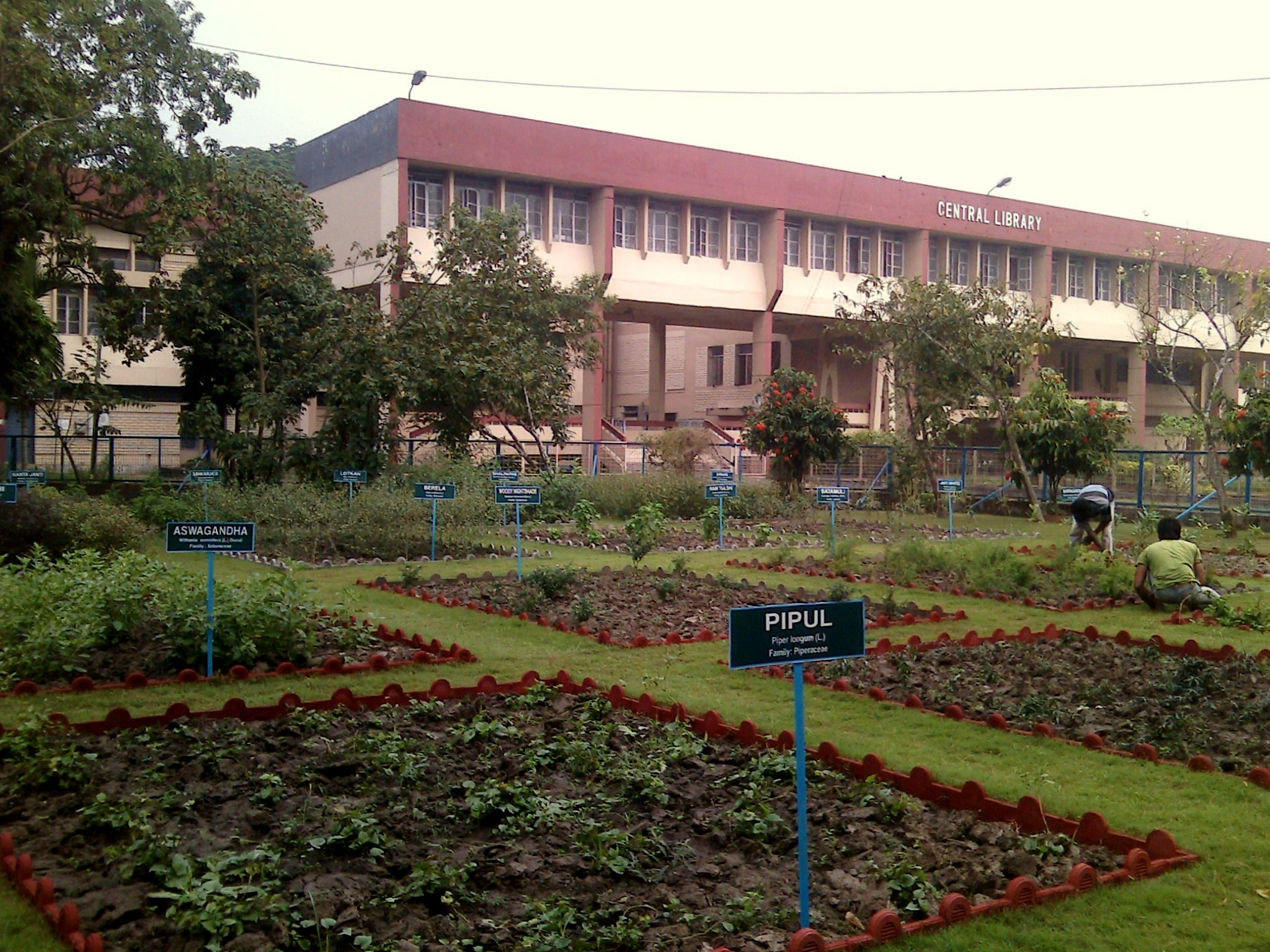
Medicinal & Aromatic Plants' Garden, BCKV.

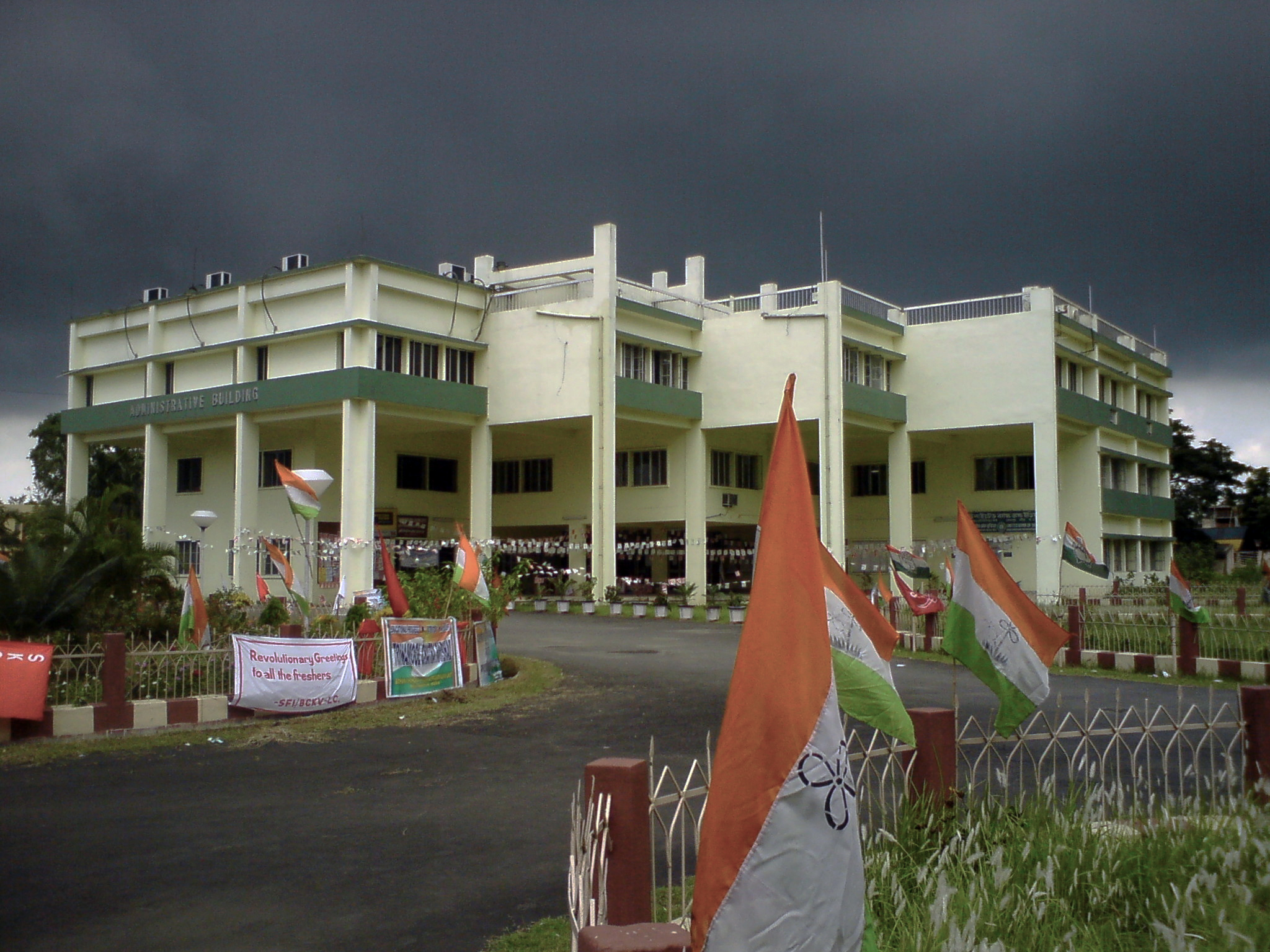
The Administrative Building under clouds.

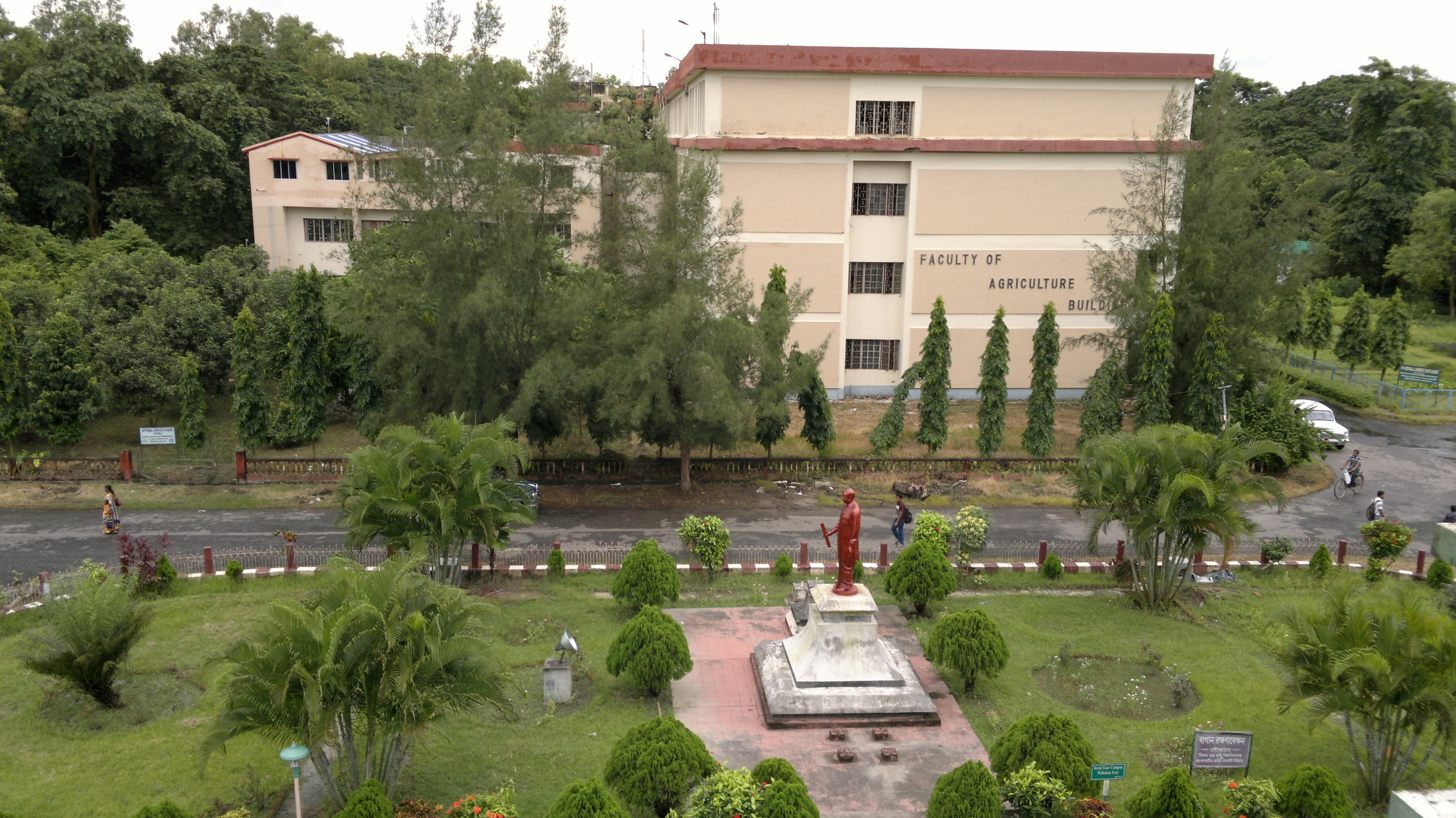
Bidhan Chandra Statue in BCKV.

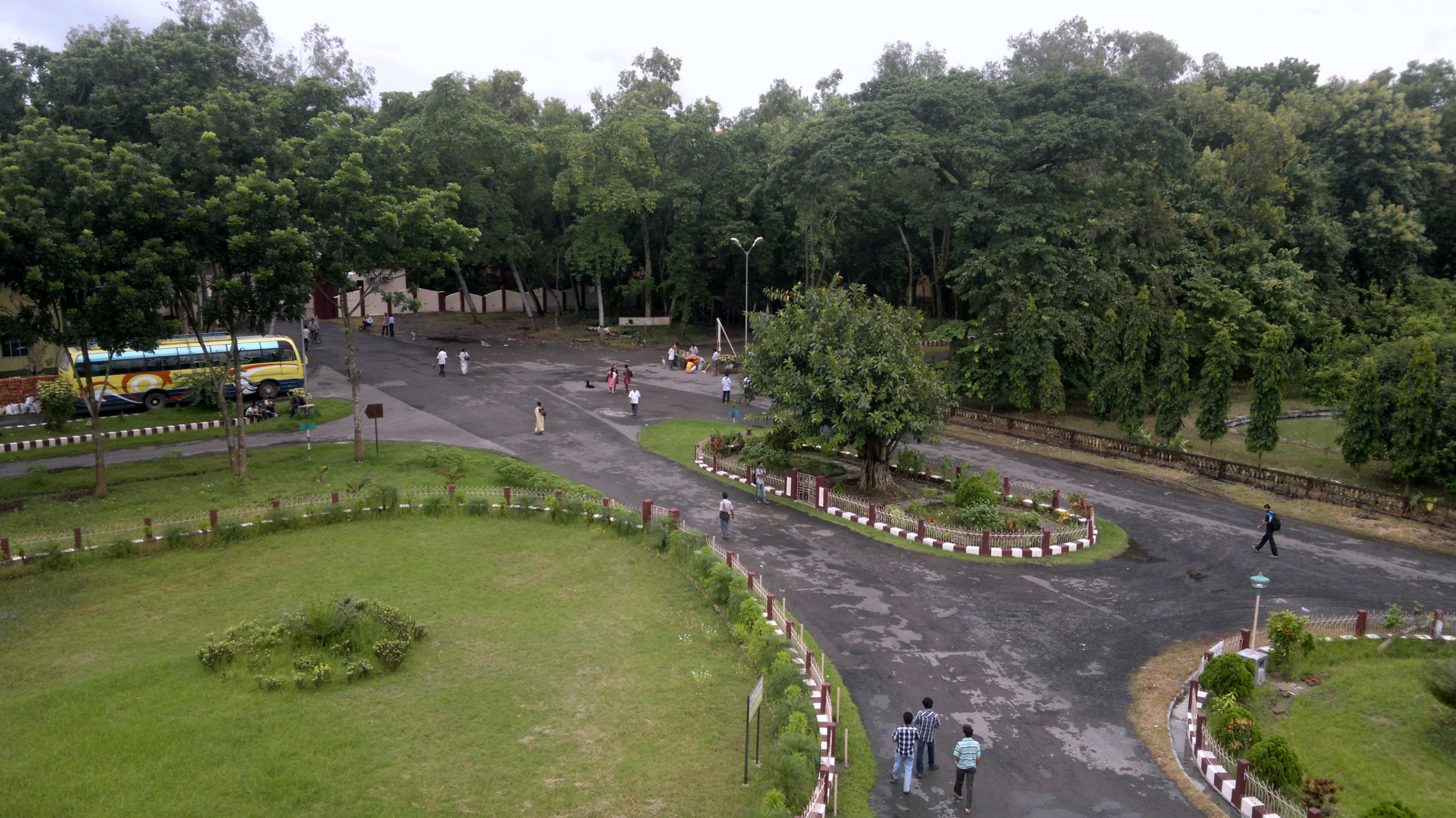
BCKV Campus.

== See also ==
- List of Agriculture Universities in India
- Indian council of Agricultural Research
- List of institutions of higher education in West Bengal
