= Nilima Nag =

Indian politician

Nilima Nag (Mallick) (born 1959) is an Indian politician from West Bengal. She was a former member of the West Bengal Legislative Assembly from Haringhata Assembly constituency which is reserved for Scheduled Caste community in Nadia district. She won for the first time in the 2011 West Bengal Legislative Assembly election representing All India Trinamool Congress.

== Early life and education ==
Nag is from Haringhata, Nadia district, West Bengal. She married late Samir Kumar Nag. She studied Class 12 at Chakdaha College and passed the higher secondary board examinations in 1977.

== Career ==
Nag won from Haringhata Assembly constituency representing the All India Trinamool Congress in the 2016 West Bengal Legislative Assembly election. She polled 94,530 votes and defeated her nearest rival, Ajoy Das of the Communist Party of India (Marxist), by a margin of 21,349 votes. She first became an MLA winning the 2011 West Bengal Legislative Assembly election representing All India Trinamool Congress. In 2011, she polled 83,366 votes and defeated her nearest rival, Biswajit Pal of the Communist Party of India (Marxist), by a margin of 13,003 votes.
