= Chakdaha Assembly constituency =

State-level election constituency in West Bengal, India

Chakdaha
- Constituency No. 91 for the West Bengal Legislative Assembly
- Interactive Map Outlining Chakdaha Assembly Constituency

Constituency details
- Country: India
- Region: East India
- State: West Bengal
- District: Nadia
- Lok Sabha constituency: Ranaghat
- Established: 1957
- Total electors: 245,514
- Reservation: None

Member of Legislative Assembly
- 18th West Bengal Legislative Assembly
- Incumbent Bankim Chandra Ghosh
- Party: BJP
- Alliance: NDA
- Elected year: 2026

Chakdaha Assembly constituency is an assembly constituency in Nadia district in the Indian state of West Bengal.

== Overview ==
As per orders of the Delimitation Commission, No. 91 Chakdaha Assembly constituency is composed of the following: Chakdaha municipality, and Chanduria I, Dubra, Ghetugachhi, Rautari, Silinda I, Silinda II, Tatla I and Tatla II gram panchayats of Chakdaha community development block.

Chakdaha Assembly constituency is part of No. 13 Ranaghat (Lok Sabha constituency) (SC). It was earlier part of Nabadwip (Lok Sabha constituency).

== Members of the Legislative Assembly ==
Year	Name	Party
1957	Suresh Chandra Banerjee	Praja Socialist Party
1962	Santi Das	Indian National Congress
1967	Haridas Mitra	Bangla Congress
1969	Subal Chandra Mandal	Bangla Congress
1971	Subhash Chandra Basu	Communist Party of India
1972	Haridas Mitra	Indian National Congress
1977	Binoy Kumar Biswas	Communist Party of India
1982	Subhas Basu	Communist Party of India
1987	Subhas Basu	Communist Party of India
1991	Satya Sadhan Chakraborty	Communist Party of India
1996	Satya Sadhan Chakraborty	Communist Party of India
2001	Satya Sadhan Chakraborty	Communist Party of India
2006	Malay Kumar Samanta	Communist Party of India
2011	Naresh Chandra Chaki	All India Trinamool Congress
2016	Ratna Ghosh Kar	All India Trinamool Congress
2021	Bankim Chandra Ghosh	Bharatiya Janata Party
2026	Bankim Chandra Ghosh	Bharatiya Janata Party

== Election Results ==
=== 2026 ===
2026 West Bengal Legislative Assembly election: Chakdaha
Party	Candidate	Votes	%	±%
BJP	Bankim Chandra Ghosh	115,433	54.78	▲7.92
AITC	Subhankar Singha	78,488	37.25	▼4.1
CPI(M)	Narayan Dasgupta	11,086	5.26	▼3.14
NOTA	None of the above	1,110	0.53	▼0.17
Majority		36,945	17.53	▲12.02
Turnout		210,720	93.79	▲7.41
BJP hold		Swing		

=== 2021 ===
2021 West Bengal Legislative Assembly election: Chakdaha
Party	Candidate	Votes	%	±%
BJP	Bankim Chandra Ghosh	99,368	46.86	
AITC	Subhankar Singha	87,688	41.35	
CPI(M)	Narayan Dasgupta	17,812	8.4	
NOTA	None of the above	1,487	0.7	
Majority		11,680	5.51	
Turnout		212,064	86.38	
BJP gain from AITC		Swing		

=== 2016 ===
In the 2016 election, Ratna Kar Ghosh of the All India Trinamool Congress defeated his nearest rival Biswanath Gupta of CPI(M).

West Bengal assembly elections, 2016: Chakdaha constituency
Party	Candidate	Votes	%	±%
AITC	Ratna Kar Ghosh	94241	49.63%	
CPI(M)	Biswanath Gupta	70588	37.17%	
BJP	Pradip Kumar Sarkar	16294	8.58%	
NOTA	NOTA	2739		
SS	Sarnab Bose	2579		
BSP	Dhirendra Majumdar	2077		
PDS	Ashok Kumar Kundu	1368		
Turnout		189886		
Majority		23,653		
Trinamool Congress hold		Swing	{{{swing}}}	

=== 2011 ===
In the 2011 election, Naresh Chandra Chaki of Trinamool Congress defeated his nearest rival Biswanath Gupta of CPI(M).

=== 2006 ===
In the 2006 state assembly elections Malay Kumar Samanta of CPI (M) won the Chakdaha assembly seat defeating his nearest rival Naresh Chandra Chaki of Trinamool Congress. Contests in most years were multi cornered but only winners and runners are being mentioned. In 2001, 1996 and 1991, Satyasadhan Chakraborty of CPI (M) defeated his nearest rivals Gouri Sankar Dutta, Sukumar Sarkar and Sukumar Roy (all of Congress) in the respective years. In 1987 and 1982, Subhas Basu of CPI (M) defeated Sanatanu Bhowmick and Narendra Nath Sarkar (both of Congress) in the respective years. In 1977, Binoy Kumar Biswas, Independent, defeated Saradindu Biswas of Congress.

=== 1972 ===
Hari Das Mitra of Congress won in 1972. Subhash Chandra Basu of CPI(M) won in 1971. Subal Chandra Mandal of Bangla Congress won in 1969. H.Mitra of Bangla Congress won in 1967. Santi Das of Congress won in 1962. Suresh Chandra Banerjee of PSP won in 1957. The Chakdaha seat was not there in 1951.
