= Haringhata =

- City
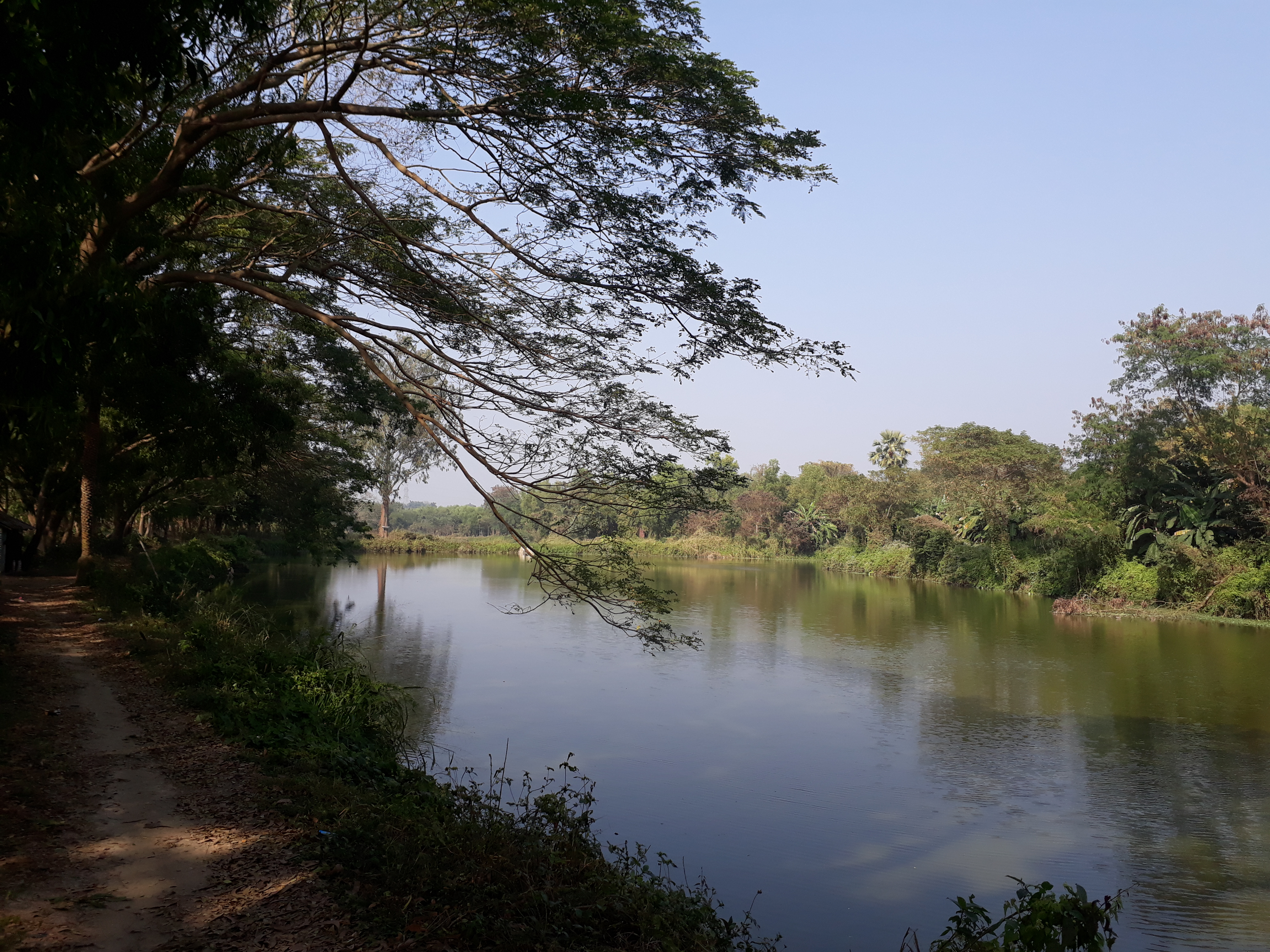
- Haringhata Forest and Lake

- Location in West Bengal, India Haringhata (India)
- Coordinates: 22.9632°N 88.5673°E
- Country: India
- State: West Bengal
- Division: Presidency
- District: Nadia

Government
  - Type: Municipality
  - Body: Haringhata Municipality
  - Chairman: Debashis Bose

Area
  - Total: 15.00 km^{2} (5.79 sq mi)
- Elevation: 10 m (33 ft)

Population (2011)
  - Total: 45,953
  - Density: 3,064/km^{2} (7,935/sq mi)

Languages
  - Official: Bengali, English
- Time zone: UTC+5:30 (IST)
- PIN: 741249
- Telephone code: +91 3473
- Vehicle registration: WB-89 Kalyani, WB-90 Kalyani,
- Lok Sabha constituency: Bangaon
- Vidhan Sabha constituency: Haringhata
- Website: www.haringhatamunicipality.org.in

Haringhata is a city and a municipality of the Nadia district in the Indian state of West Bengal. It is a part of the area covered by Kolkata Metropolitan Development Authority (KMDA).

== Geography ==
Cities and towns in Kalyani subdivision of Nadia district
M: municipal town/ city/notified area, CT: census town, R: rural/ urban centre.
Owing to space constraints in the small map, the actual locations in a larger map may vary slightly

=== Location ===
Haringhata is located at 22.9632°N 88.5673°E. It has an average elevation of 10 metres (33 feet).

=== Area overview ===
Nadia district is part of the large alluvial plain formed by the Ganges-Bhagirathi system. The Kalyani subdivision has the Bhagirathi/ Hooghly on the west. Topographically, Kalyani subdivision is a part of the Ranaghat-Chakdaha Plain, the low-lying area found in the south-eastern part of the district. The smallest subdivision in the district, area-wise, has the highest level of urbanisation in the district. 76.73% of the population lives in urban areas and 23.27% lives in the rural areas.

Note: The map alongside presents some of the notable locations in the subdivision. All places marked in the map are linked in the larger full screen map. All the four subdivisions are presented with maps on the same scale – the size of the maps varies as per the area of the subdivision.

== Civic administration ==
=== Municipality ===
Haringhata, earlier a census town, was created a municipality in 2015. Haringhata Municipality covers 35 sq.km. area. Consists of 17 wards with approx. 13600+ households.

=== Police station ===
Haringhata police station has jurisdiction over Haringhata CD block. The total area covered by the police station is 170 km^{2} and the population covered is 229,825 (2001 census).

== Demographics ==
According to the 2011 Census of India, Haringhata had a total population of 45,953, of which 23,298 (51%) were males and 22,655 (49%) were females. Population in the age range 0–6 years was 6,465. The total number of literate persons in Haringhata was 42,766 (78.49% of the population over 6 years).

== Economy ==
The Reliance group have evinced interest in the Haringhata Dairy. They have plans to enter the food business. Consultants have recommended that four government dairies be placed in the joint sector.

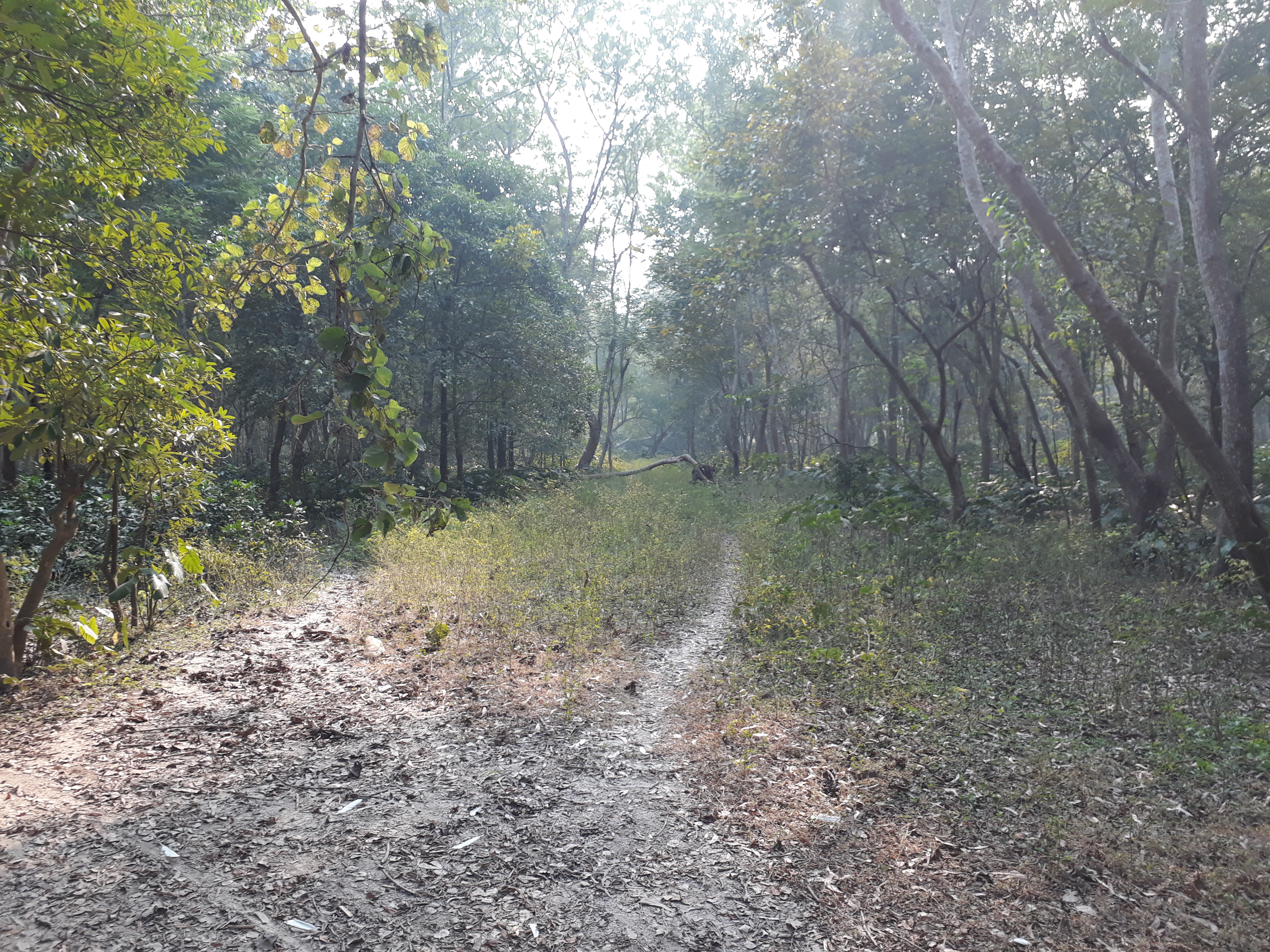
Haringhata Forest beside Dairy farm. Nadia

== Education ==
- Bidhan Chandra Krishi Viswa Vidyalaya is located at Mohanpur, Haringhata.
- West Bengal University of Animal and Fishery Sciences, Departments of this faculty are situated at two different locations: Belgachia (in Kolkata) and Mohanpur (in Nadia district).
- Indian Institute of Science Education and Research, Kolkata, a scientific research institution, has built its permanent campus in Haringhata.
- Haringhata Mahavidyalaya was established at Haringhata in 1986. Affiliated to the University of Kalyani, it offers honours courses in Bengali, English, geography, education, history, political science and accountancy.
- Hemnalini Memorial College of Engineering is a private engineering college in Haringhata, West Bengal, India offers Bachelor of Technology courses which are affiliated to West Bengal University of Technology (WBUT).
- Maulana Abul Kalam Azad University of Technology is building its campus there.
- Barajaguli Gopal Academy, the century-old school in the area.
