= Haringhata Assembly constituency =

Haringhata
- Constituency No. 93 for the West Bengal Legislative Assembly
- Interactive Map Outlining Haringhata Assembly Constituency

Constituency details
- Country: India
- Region: East India
- State: West Bengal
- District: Nadia
- Lok Sabha constituency: Bangaon
- Established: 1957
- Total electors: 240,606
- Reservation: SC

Member of Legislative Assembly
- 18th West Bengal Legislative Assembly
- Incumbent Asim Kumar Sarkar
- Party: BJP
- Alliance: NDA
- Elected year: 2026

Haringhata Assembly constituency is an assembly constituency in Nadia district in the Indian state of West Bengal. It is reserved for scheduled castes.

== Overview ==
As per orders of the Delimitation Commission, No. 93 Haringhata Assembly constituency (SC) is composed of the following: Haringhata municipality, Haringhata community development block, and Dewli and Hingara gram panchayats of Chakdaha community development block.

Haringhata Assembly constituency (SC) is part of No. 14 Bangaon (Lok Sabha constituency) (SC). It was earlier part of the Nabadwip (Lok Sabha constituency).

== Members of the Legislative Assembly ==
Year	Name	Party
1957	Smarajit Bandopadhyay	Indian National Congress
1957	Promatha Ranjan Thakur	Indian National Congress
1962	Narendra Nath Sarkar	Indian National Congress
1967	Mohammad Karim Baksh	Independent politician
1969	Mohammad Karim Baksh	Independent politician
1971	Nani Gopal Malakar	Communist Party of India
1972	Sakti Kumar Bhattacharya	Communist Party of India
1977	Nani Gopal Malakar	Communist Party of India
1982	Nani Gopal Malakar	Communist Party of India
1987	Nani Gopal Malakar	Communist Party of India
1991	Nani Gopal Malakar	Communist Party of India
1996	Mili Hira	Communist Party of India
2001	Bankim Chandra Ghosh	Communist Party of India
2006	Bankim Chandra Ghosh	Communist Party of India
2011	Nilima Nag (Mallick)	All India Trinamool Congress
2016	Nilima Nag (Mallick)	All India Trinamool Congress
2021	Asim Kumar Sarkar	Bharatiya Janata Party
2026	Asim Kumar Sarkar	Bharatiya Janata Party

== Election results ==
=== 2026 ===
2026 West Bengal Legislative Assembly election: Haringhata
Party	Candidate	Votes	%	±%
BJP	Asim Kumar Sarkar	107,900	50.72	▲4.41
AITC	Rajib Biswas	85,845	40.35	▲1.24
CPI(M)	Swapan Kumar Sarkar	12,370	5.81	▼5.95
NOTA	None of the above	1,575	0.74	▲0.06
Majority		22,055	10.37	▲3.17
Turnout		212,756	94.31	▲6.67
BJP hold		Swing		

=== 2021 ===
West Bengal assembly elections, 2021: Haringhata (SC) constituency
Party	Candidate	Votes	%	±%
BJP	Asim Kumar Sarkar	97,666	46.31	
AITC	Nilima Nag	82,466	39.11	
CPI(M)	Alakesh Das	24,800	11.76	
NOTA	None of the above	1,427	0.68	
Majority		15,200	7.2	
Turnout		210,874	87.64	
BJP gain from AITC		Swing		

=== 2011 ===
In the 2011 election, Nilima Nag (Mallick) of Trinamool Congress defeated her nearest rival Dr. Biswajit Paul of CPI(M).

West Bengal assembly elections, 2011: Haringhata (SC) constituency
Party	Candidate	Votes	%	±%
AITC	Nilima Nag (Mallick)	83,366	49.45	+6.76#
CPI(M)	Dr. Biswajit Paul	70,363	41.74	−10.16
BJP	Binay Krishna Biswas	8,780	5.21	
PDS	Shyam Prasad Mondal	3,810		
BSP	Bidyut Mallick	2,261		
Turnout		168,580	89.89	
AITC gain from CPI(M)		Swing	+16.92#	

.# Swing calculated on Congress+Trinamool Congress vote percentages taken together in 2006.

=== 2006 ===
In the 2006 and 2001 state assembly elections, Bankim Chandra Ghosh of CPI (M) won the Haringhata assembly seat, defeating his nearest rivals Dipak Basu and Saradindu Biswas (both of Trinamool Congress) in the respective years. Contests in most years were multi cornered but only winners and runners are being mentioned. In 1996, Mili Hira of CPI (M) defeated Ratna Ghosh of Congress. In 1991, 1987, 1982 and 1977 Nani Gopal Malakar of CPI (M) defeated Pratap Roy of Congress, Dilip Roy of Congress, Phani Bhusan Das of ICS and Manas Kumar Ganguly of Congress in the respective years.

=== 1972 ===
Sakti Kumar Bhattacharya of CPI won in 1972. Nani Gopal Malakar of CPI won in 1971. Mohammad Karim Baksh, Independent, won in 1969 and 1967. Narendra Nath Sarkar of Congress won in 1962. In 1957 Haringhata was a joint seat with one seat reserved for SC. Smarajit Bandopadhyay and Promatha Ranjan Thakur, both of Congress, won in 1957. The Haringhata seat was not there in 1951.
