= Kalyani Stadium =

Sports stadium in West Bengal, India

Kalyani Stadium কল্যাণী স্টেডিয়াম
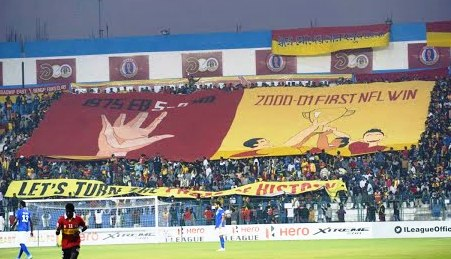
- The stadium on a matchday of I-League in 2020
- Interactive map of Kalyani Stadium কল্যাণী স্টেডিয়াম
- Full name: Kalyani Municipal Stadium
- Location: Kalyani, West Bengal, India
- Coordinates: 22.97471°N 88.44870°E
- Owner: Kalyani Municipality
- Operator: Kalyani Municipality
- Capacity: 20,000
- Surface: Grass
- Scoreboard: Yes (manual)
- Public transit: Kalyani and Kalyani Silpanchal

Tenants
- United SC; Mohun Bagan; East Bengal; Mohammedan; East Bengal (women); Calcutta Football League (selected matches); Bengal Super League (selected matches)

Kalyani Stadium is a stadium in Kalyani, West Bengal, India. The stadium holds 20,000 spectators. It usually hosts matches of the I-League and the Calcutta Football League.

== About ==
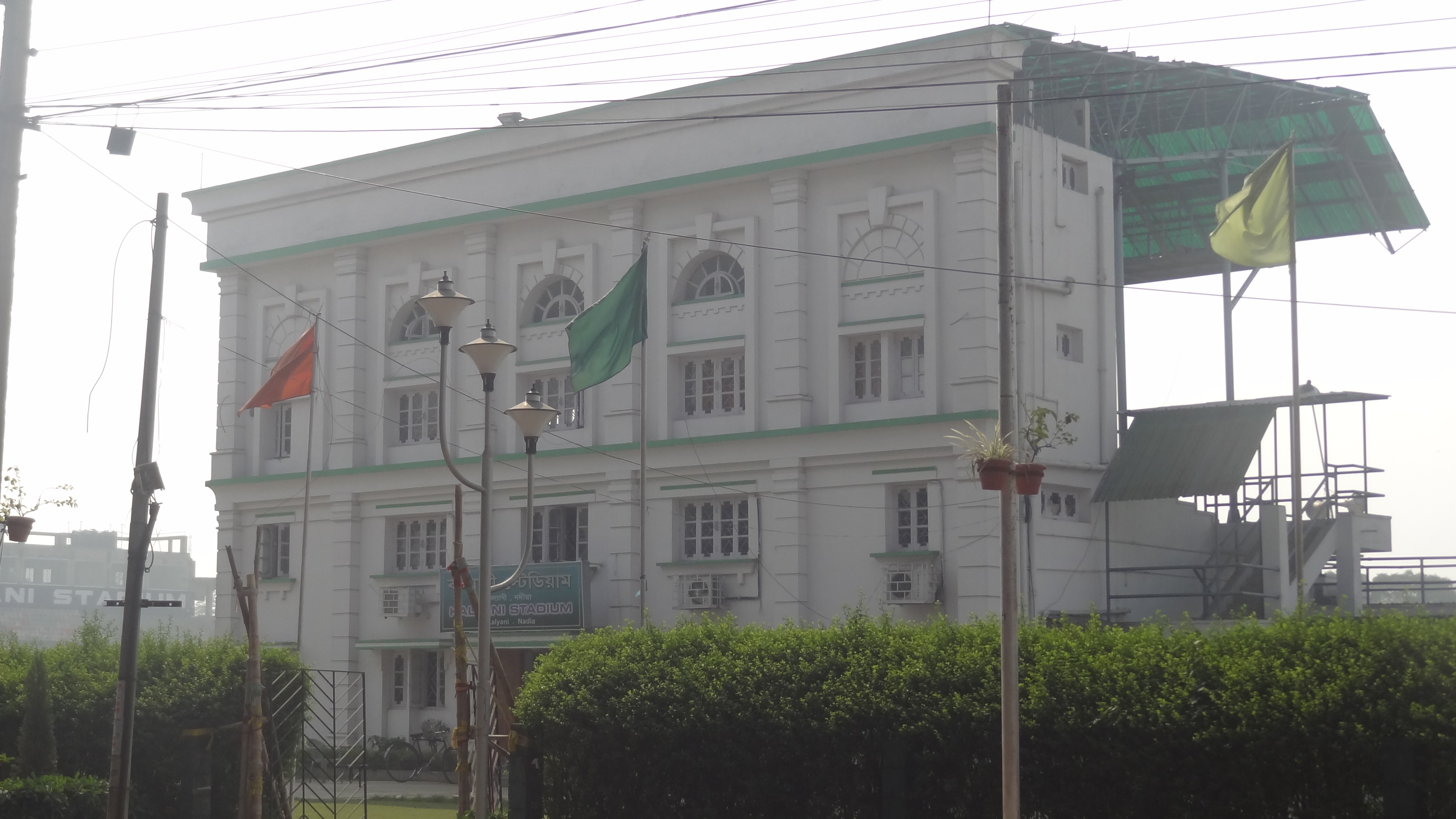
Outside view of the stadium

It is the home stadium of Mohun Bagan, East Bengal of the I-League. It has emerged as an alternative location to Kolkata for holding numerous I-League, Calcutta Football League football matches and other sporting events. Kalyani Stadium hosts national and international level football matches.

The Kolkata-based clubs like Mohun Bagan, East Bengal and Mohammedan use Kalyani Stadium as their home ground in some national and regional league matches. It is also currently used by Inter Kashi.

A swimming pool and well-equipped gymnasium are attached with the said Stadium. The stadium also has floodlights to support night matches.

Presently the stadium has been re-modelled with full-fledged modern structure and 5 storied gallery with added facilities.

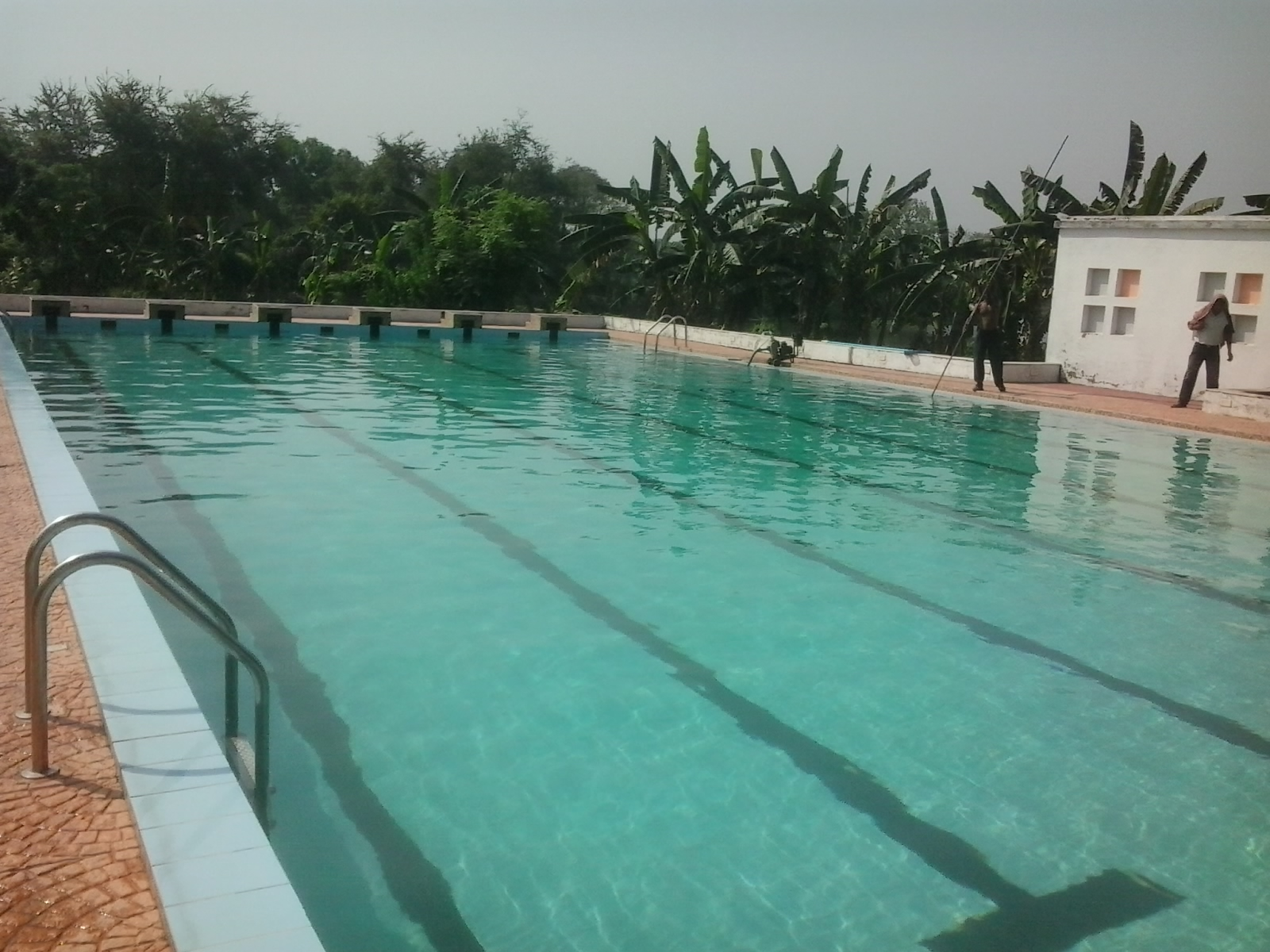
Kalyani Stadium Swimming Pool

== Position ==
Kalyani Stadium situated near the Kalyani Lake and almost in the middle portion of Kalyani city. The main gate of it is just opposite of the Kalyani Sub Divisional Court Building. A swimming pool and gymnasium are attached with the Stadium.

== Transportation ==
10 minutes away from Kalyani railway station and 5 minutes away from Kalyani Silpanchal railway station from the stadium.

There are numerous autos, totos and buses are available.

== Football matches ==
The Kalyani Stadium hosts the home games of the local clubs Mohun Bagan, East Bengal, Mohammedan in the Calcutta Football League.

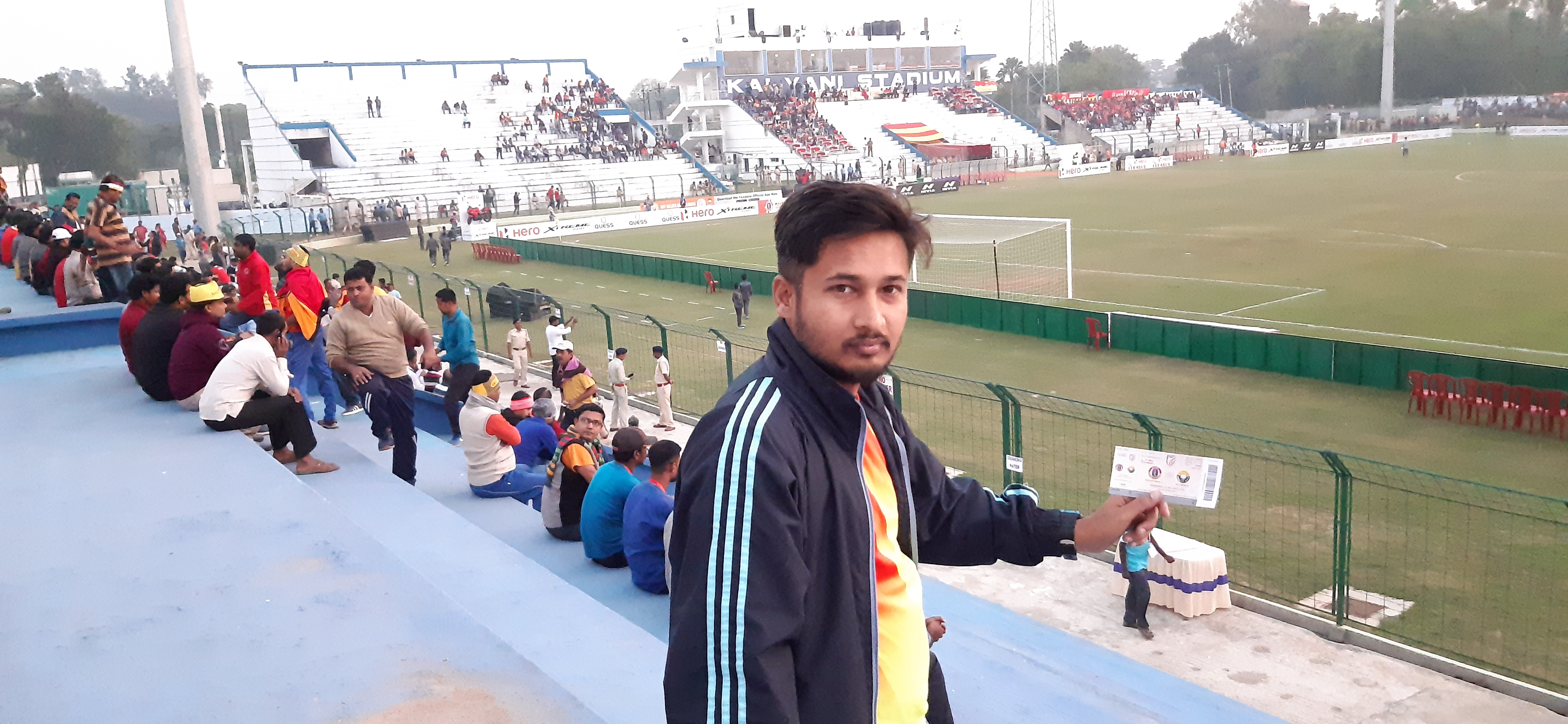
East Bengal supporters at the stadium on a matchday of I-League

The stadium has also hosted domestic association football tournaments like the Durand Cup in 2019, IFA Shield, Santosh Trophy, 2019 SAFF U-15 Championship, Calcutta Football League, U-17 Women's Championship in 2019 and many others Indian and international tournaments.
