= Kalyani Government Engineering College =

Public engineering college in Kalyani, West Bengal, India

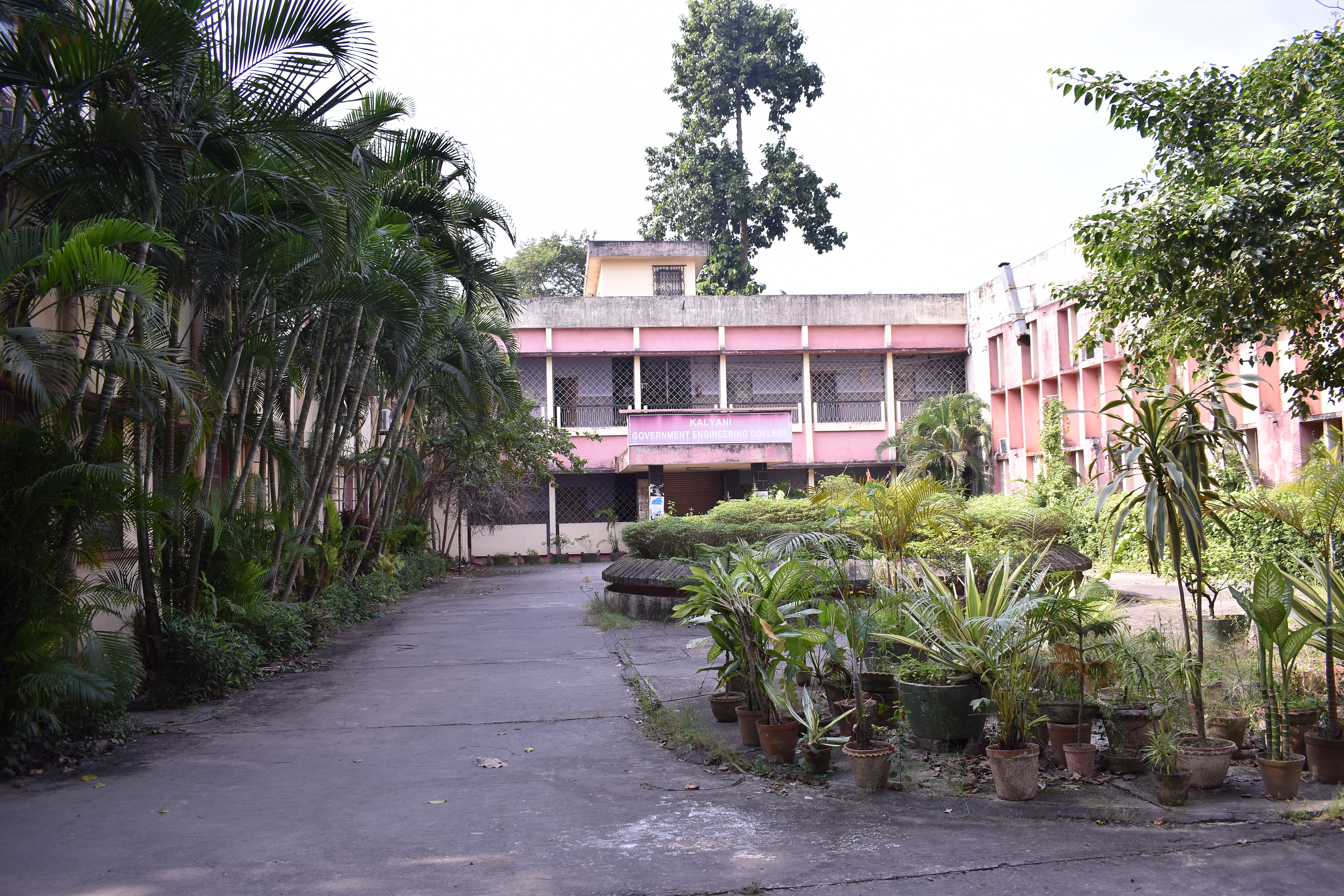
- Main building
- Motto: आत्मान विद्धि (Sanskrit)
- Motto in English: To know oneself
- Type: Public Engineering College (aided by the World Bank under TEQIP Programme)
- Established: 1995; 31 years ago
- Affiliations: MAKAUT
- Principal: Dr. Sourav Kumar Das
- Students: 1,267
- Undergraduates: 1,163
- Postgraduates: 104
- Location: Kalyani, West Bengal, 741235, India; 22.99139°N 88.4482395°E
- Campus: 75 acres (0.3 km^{2})
- Acronym: KGEC
- Approvals: AICTE
- Website: www.kgec.edu.in

- Location within West Bengal Location within India

Kalyani Government Engineering College (KGEC) is a public Engineering college in Kalyani, West Bengal. It was established in 1995 by the Government of West Bengal.

It is a four-year undergraduate institution. It offers undergraduate (B.Tech.) and postgraduate (M.Tech., M.C.A.) engineering degree courses affiliated to the Maulana Abul Kalam Azad University of Technology (MAKAUT), West Bengal previously known as West Bengal University of Technology (WBUT).

== Campus ==
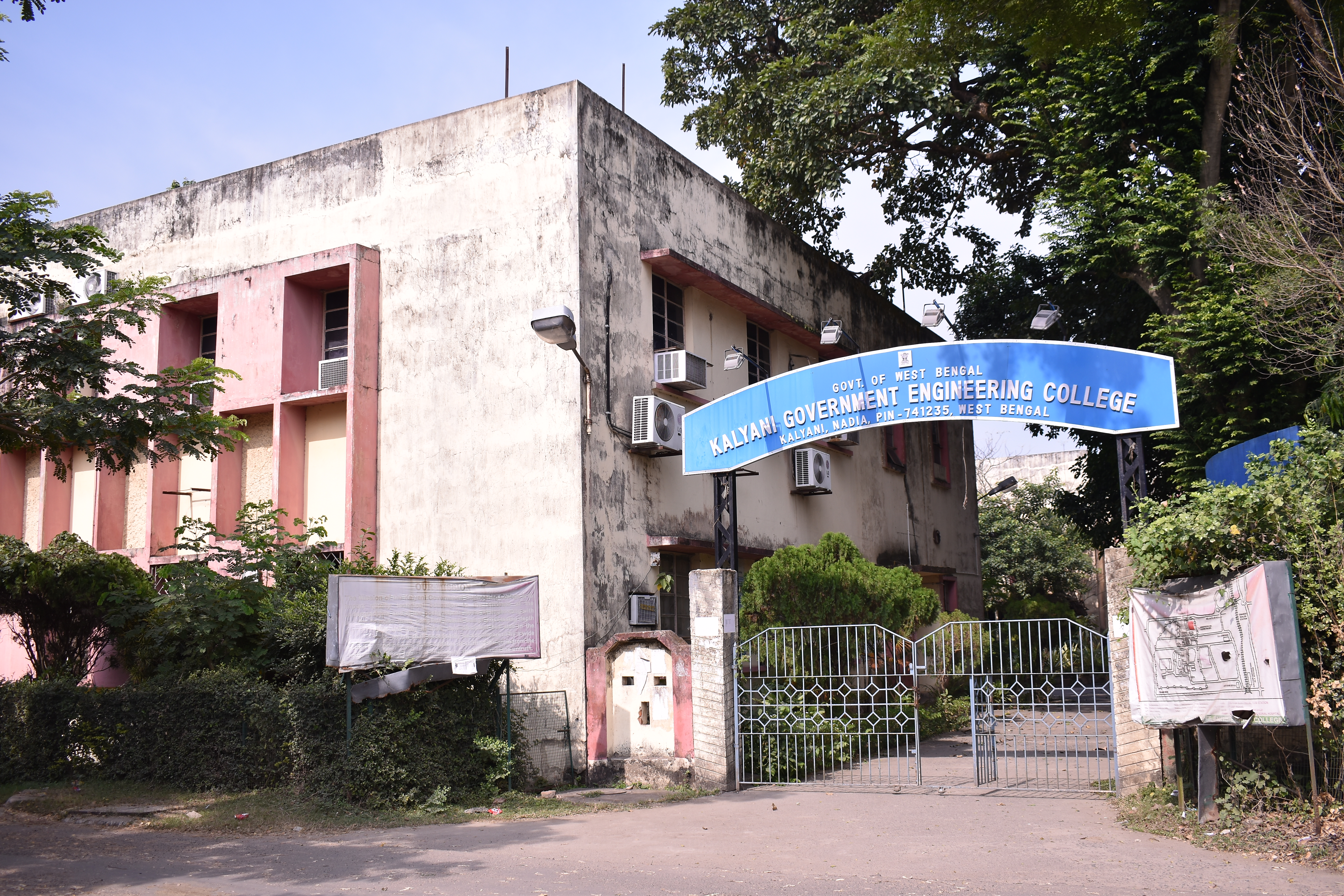
Kalyani Govt. Engineering College front gate

Kalyani Government Engineering College is an engineering college in West Bengal, India. The college was established in 1995 by the Government of West Bengal. The college is located within the University of Kalyani Campus, Kalyani Township, District Nadia, West Bengal. Kalyani is 53 km. from the Sealdah Railway station (Eastern Railways) of Kolkata and is also connected through Kalyani Expressway. The nearest railway station to the college is Kalyani Ghoshpara railway station is about 2 km. away from the venue.

== Academics ==
=== Affiliation and accreditations ===
- All India Council for Technical Education [AICTE]
- University Grants Commission (India) [UGC], Government of India
- Ministry of Human Resource Department, Government of India
- Ministry of Higher Education Dept., Govt. of West Bengal

=== Academic programmes ===
==== Undergraduate courses offered ====
- B.Tech. in Electrical Engineering
- B.Tech. in Mechanical Engineering
- B.Tech. in Electronics and Communication Engineering
- B.Tech. in Computer Science and Engineering
- B.Tech. in Information Technology

==== Postgraduate courses offered ====
- M.C.A. - Master of Computer Applications
- M.Tech. in Production Engineering (Manufacturing Engineering)
- M.Tech. in Computer Science and Engineering
- M.Tech. in Electronics & Communication Engineering
- M.Tech. in Information Technology
- M.Tech. in Electrical Engineering

=== Admission procedure ===
The undergraduate students (B.Tech.) of this college are admitted through the West Bengal Joint Entrance Examination (WBJEE)which is very competitive in nature. B.Tech. courses have a provision of 20% lateral entry at the second-year level from WB Joint Entrance Examination for Lateral Entry (JELET). Also there are additional 5% seats that are allocated for Tuition Fee Waiver Scheme of Govt. of West Bengal.

Similarly, the M.C.A. students are being admitted through the WB MCA Joint Entrance Examination (JECA).

The institute takes admission to M Tech courses by GATE examination and PGET exam conducted by MAKAUT.

The institute being a government one, has no management quota private admission facility for any of its courses.

=== Publications ===
The college also publishes an annual research journal, named Reason - A Technical Journal, since 1999. In 2011, International Standard Serial Number (ISSN 2277-1654) was allotted to this journal.

=== Rankings ===
The college is regulated, operated and administered by the Government of West Bengal. KGEC is ranked no. 69 in all India rankings of Top 100 Engineering Colleges of India in 2012. As per the survey conducted by The Telegraph it is ranked 4th best engineering institute in West Bengal which admits through WBJEE.

== Student life ==
=== Student accommodation (hostels) ===
==== For boys ====
- Raja Rammohan Roy Hall (New Hall)
- Vidyasagar Chhatrabas (VC)
- Acharya Prafulla Chandra Roy Hall (APC)
- Type IV Boys Hostel (M.Tech.)
- Rishi Bankim Chandra Hall (RBC)

==== For girls ====
- Pritilata Chhatrinivas (PC)

Acharya Prafulla Chandra Roy Hall is reserved for second-year students. All the hostels except VC are located inside the college campus. There is accommodation for the MCA students, in Vidyasagar Chhatrabas (VC). There are a total of 13 clubs in the college.

== See also ==
- List of institutions of higher education in West Bengal
- Education in India
- Education in West Bengal
