= Kalyani Silpanchal railway station =

Kolkata suburban railway station in kalyani, West Bengal, India

Kalyani Silpanchal
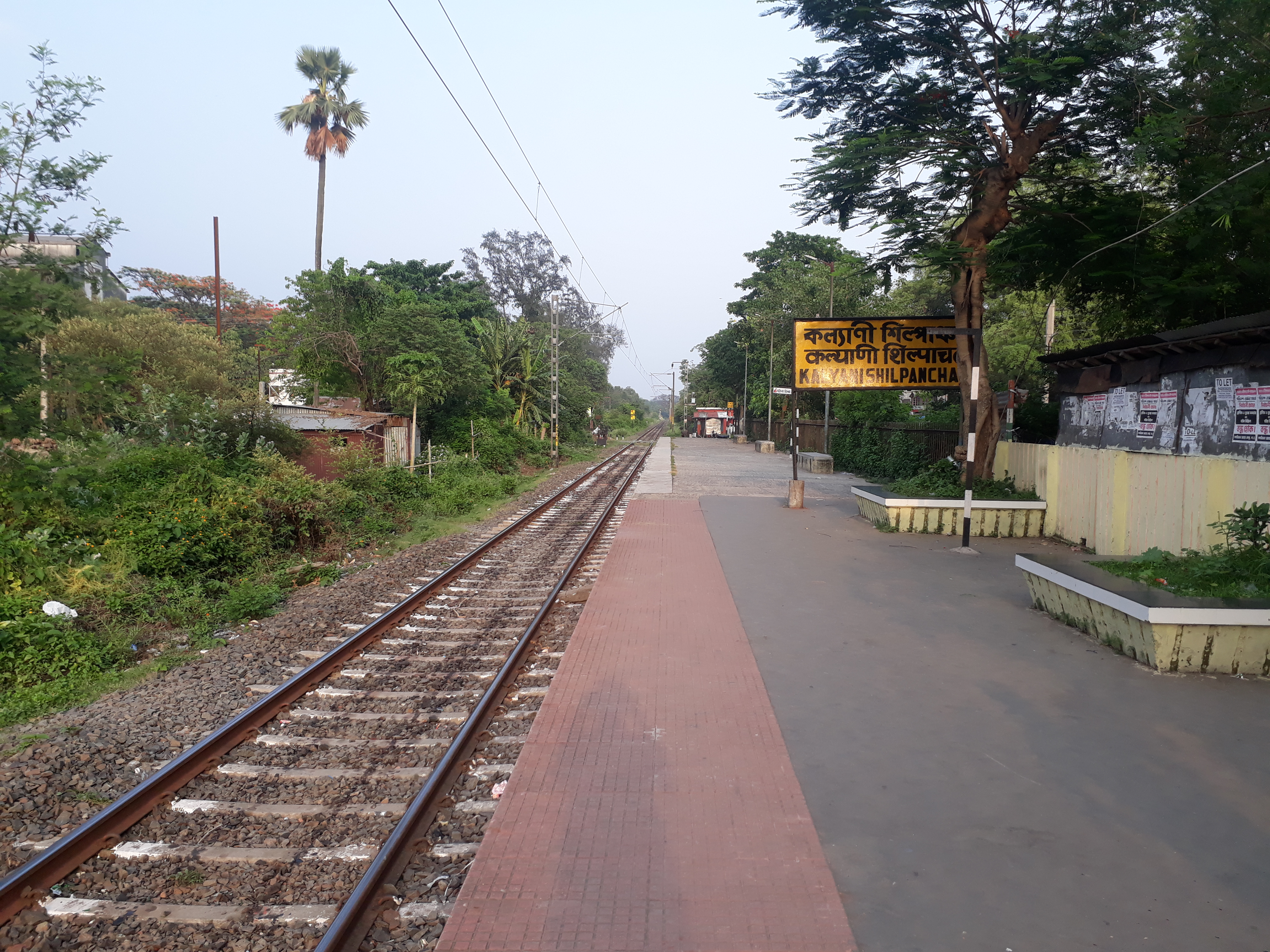
- Kalyani Shilpanchal railway station

General information
- Location: Silpanchal Station Road, Kalyani, Nadia district, West Bengal; India
- Coordinates: 22.976392°N 88.456416°E
- Elevation: 13 metres (43 ft)
- System: Kolkata Suburban Railway
- Owner: Indian Railways
- Operator: Eastern Railway
- Line: Kalyani–Kalyani Simanta link
- Platforms: 1
- Tracks: 1

Construction
- Structure type: Standard (on-ground station)
- Parking: Available
- Cycle facilities: Not available
- Accessible: Not available

Other information
- Status: Functioning
- Station code: KLYS
- Zone(s): Eastern Railway
- Division(s): Sealdah

History
- Opened: 1979
- Electrified: 1979

Services
Preceding station	Kolkata Suburban Railway	Following station
Kalyani towards Sealdah	Eastern Line Main line	Kalyani Ghoshpara towards Kalyani Simanta
Route map
Location
- Location within West Bengal Location within India

Kalyani Silpanchal railway station (Bengali: কল্যাণী শিল্পাঞ্চল রেলওয়ে স্টেশন) is a Kolkata Suburban Railway station on the Kalyani Simanta branch line of Sealdah railway division. It is situated at Shilpanchal Road, Kalyani in Nadia district in the Indian state of West Bengal. It serves Kalyani industrial areas.

== History ==
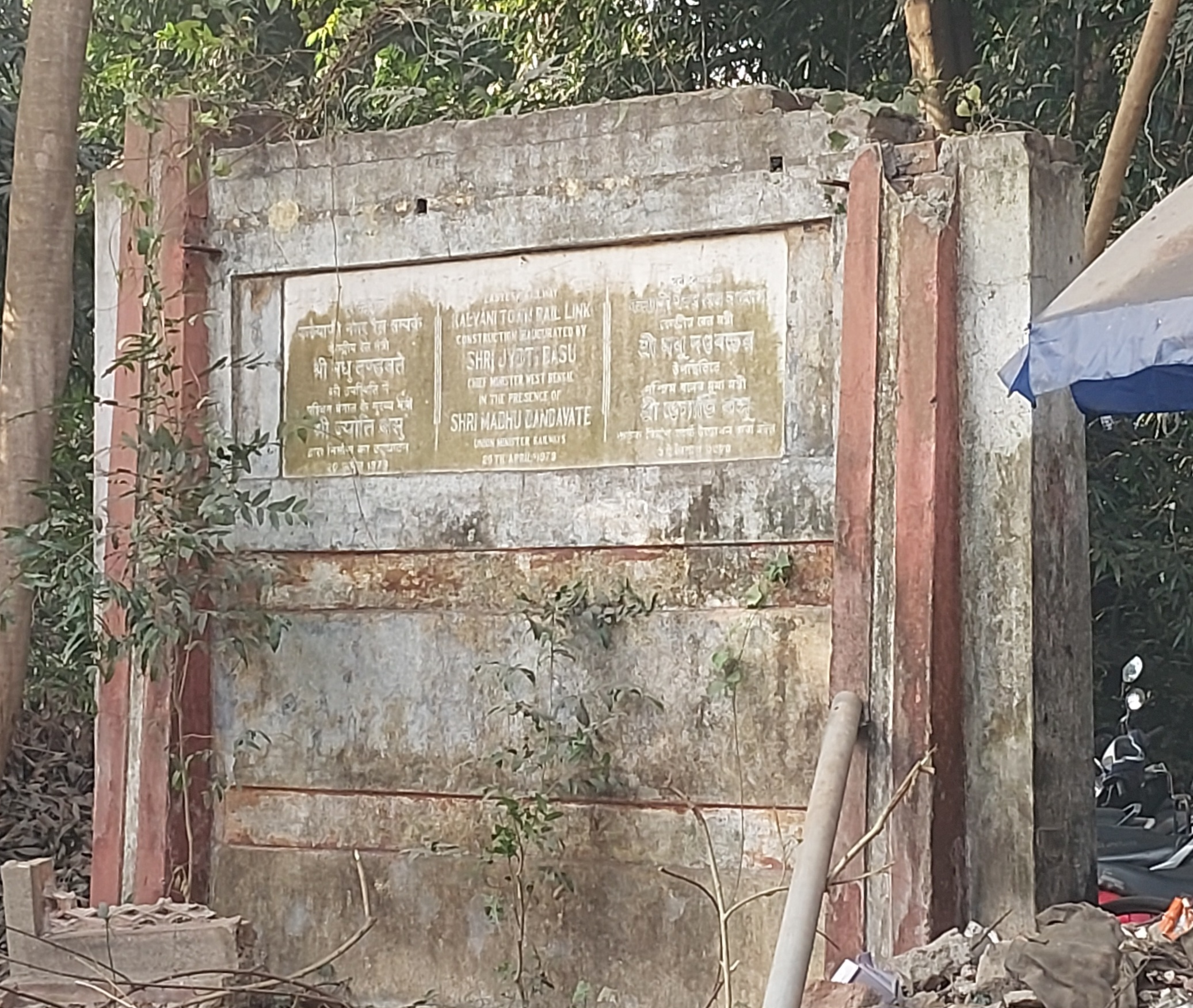
Kalyani Simanta branch line memorial

The Calcutta (Sealdah)–Kusthia line of Eastern Bengal Railway was opened to run in the year of 1862. British Government in India established the railway station in the then Roosvelt town named Chandmari Halt in 1883. In 1954 it was renamed into Kalyani. In 1979, the rail line was extended from Kalyani main station to Kalyani Simanta railway station and also established direct connectivity to Sealdah through Kalyani Simanta local EMU trains.
