= Kalyani, West Bengal =

City in West Bengal, India

Kalyani
- City
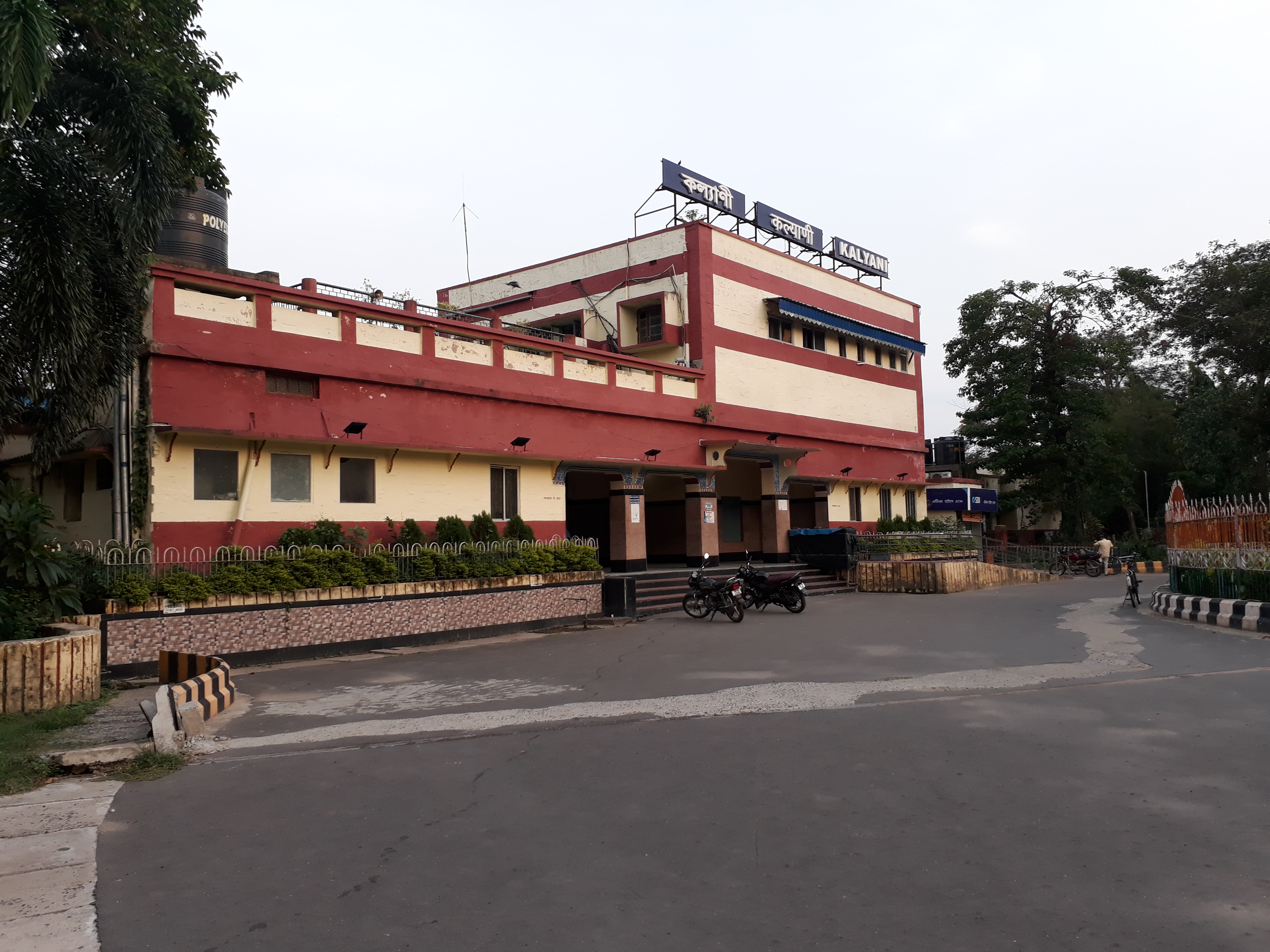
- Kalyani main railway station

- Location in West Bengal, India Kalyani (India)
- Coordinates: 22°58′30″N 88°26′04″E
- Country: India
- State: West Bengal
- Division: Presidency
- Subdivision: Kalyani
- District: Nadia
- Foundation stone laid: 24 February 1951
- Founded by: Bidhan Chandra Roy

Government
  - Type: Municipality & BDO
  - Body: Kalyani Municipality & Kalyani BDO
  - MLA: Ambika Roy
  - MP: Shantanu Thakur

Area
  - Total: 29.21 km^{2} (11.28 sq mi)
- Elevation: 11 m (36 ft)

Population (2011)
  - Total: 100,620
  - Density: 3,445/km^{2} (8,922/sq mi)

Languages
  - Official: Bengali
  - Additional official: English
- Time zone: UTC+5:30 (IST)
- PIN: 741235, 741245, 741234, 741250, 741251
- Telephone code: +91 33
- ISO 3166 code: IN-WB
- Vehicle registration: WB-90 & WB-89
- Sex ratio: 978 ♂/♀
- Lok Sabha constituency: Bangaon
- Vidhan Sabha constituency: Kalyani
- Website: www.kalyanimunicipality.org

Kalyani is a city and a municipality & BDO in the Nadia district of the Indian state of West Bengal. It is the headquarters of Kalyani subdivision and part of the Presidency division. Kalyani is a part of the area covered by the Kolkata Metropolitan Development Authority (KMDA).

== History ==
Kalyani, located in Nadia district in the state of West Bengal, is a relatively young town. During the Second World War, Kalyani, was the site of an American military airbase, formed out of 21 villages in the district of Nadia.

The military garrison town was named after the then-sitting President of the United States Franklin D. Roosevelt as "Roosevelt Town" or "Roosevelt Nagar", with "nagar" meaning "town" in many Indo-Aryan languages, including Bengali. Hangars and other reminders of the airfield are still visible in the 'A' Block and some areas around Kalyani University, whose buildings were built on or over the runways. After World War II, the United States Army Air Force left the base, and the airfield and hangars went into disuse.

The development of modern Kalyani is credited to the former Chief Minister of West Bengal, Bidhan Chandra Roy. After the independence of India in 1947, the master plan of the town was developed and the foundation stone for the town was laid by the then Governor of West Bengal, Kailashnath Katju, on 24 February 1951. The town was built quickly in order to host the 59th Indian National Congress meeting in 1954. In memoriam of that conference, a road of the town was named as 'Congress Road'. In 1957, the Kalyani police station was formed, and in 1979, the rail line was extended from Kalyani Central to Kalyani Simanta station, and also established direct connectivity to Kolkata through Kalyani Simanta local EMU trains.

In 1995, the Kalyani Municipality was established, which has been crucial in the development of infrastructure in Kalyani. In 2014, Kalyani was selected as a candidate for a "Smart City" project. Although this project has since been abandoned by the State Government.

== Geography and urban structure ==
Kalyani is located in the Nadia district of West Bengal, within the Kolkata metropolitan area. Kalyani lies along the east bank of the Hooghly River, within the upper Ganges Delta. As with most of the Indo-Gangetic Plain, the soil and water are predominantly alluvial in origin. Kalyani is located over the "Bengal basin", a pericratonic tertiary basin. According to the Bureau of Indian Standards, on a scale ranging from I to V in order of increasing susceptibility to earthquakes, the city lies inside seismic zone III; according to a United Nations Development Programme report, its wind and cyclone zone is "very high damage risk".

Kalyani is a planned city, having underground drainage systems, tree-lined avenues, community parks, paved roads intersecting each other at 90-degree angle. The city itself is divided into four blocks — Block A, Block B, Block C and Block D, which are further divided into sub-blocks. Block A and B are mostly residential in character with commercial markets. Main Post Office, Industrial Training Institute, Government offices and the Public Library along with offices of major Banks are situated in Block B. Whereas the Kalyani main station, State General Hospital, Medical college are situated in A Block. Block C and Block D are located to the north of Kalyani Simanta branch line. Block C is reserved for institutional use and is largely occupied by the Kalyani University and Kalyani Government Engineering College. Block D is the industrial zone, consisting of many small and medium-sized industries.

In June 2015, the Government of West Bengal declared establishment of an "Analytics City" name Samriddhi in Kalyani, besides Uditi Government Housing Project which was projected to attract investments of more than Rs 3,000 crore in next three years. In the first phase, being developed over 52 acres off Kalyani Expressway, the hub will accommodate academic, residential and commercial centers apart from real estate projects.

New Kalyani Block consists of 7 Gram Panchayats: Saguna, Madanpur - 1, Madanpur - 2, Chanduria - 2, Simurali, Kanchrapara, and Sarati.

== Police station ==
Kalyani police station under Ranaghat Police District has jurisdiction over Kalyani, Gayespur municipal towns and Saguna Panchayat areas. The total area covered by the police station is 64 km^{2} and the population covered is 201,871 (2001 census).

== Demographics ==
Historical population
Year	Pop.	±%
1961	4,616	—
1971	18,310	+296.7%
1981	39,257	+114.4%
1991	57,648	+46.8%
2001	85,503	+48.3%
2011	100,575	+17.6%
Source: Government of India

Religions in Kalyani
Religion	Percent
Hindus	97.80%
Muslims	0.76%
Christians	0.21%
Buddhists	0.07%
Sikhs	0.06%
Jains	0.01%
Others†	1.09%
†includes irreligious and religion not stated (~0.5%).

As of 2011 Census of India, Kalyani has a population of 100,620. Males constitute 50.55% of the population and females 49%. Kalyani has an average literacy rate of 88.75%, higher than the national average of 69.5%: male literacy is 92.79%, and female literacy is 84.65%. In Kalyani, 7.55% of the population is under 6 years of age. The sex ratio of Kalyani is 978. As per 2001 Census, the average household size of Kalyani is approximately 4.61. Percentage of main workers out of total population is 29%.

=== Languages ===
Languages spoken in Kalyani City (2011)
1. Bengali (86.9%)
2. Hindi (9.15%)
3. Santali (3.13%)
4. Bhojpuri (0.35%)
5. Nepali (0.24%)
6. Others (0.77%)

== Civic administration and utility services ==
The town is within the Bongaon Lok Sabha Constituency and elects one member to the Lok Sabha (the Lower House of the Indian Parliament). The town area is covered by one assembly constituency, Kalyani that elects one member to the Vidhan Sabha, which is the West Bengal state legislative assembly. Kalyani town comes under the jurisdiction of the district police (which is a part of the state police); the Superintendent of Police oversees the town's security and matters pertaining to law and order. Kalyani is also the seat of the Subdivisional Court.

Kalyani quickly registered itself as a self-sufficient township. Its gradual development continued as a notified area. In 1995, it was upgraded to a municipality.

== Transport ==
Kalyani railway station is on the Sealdah-Ranaghat Line of the Kolkata Suburban Railway. Apart from Kalyani main station, there are three different stations on the branch line which goes deeper into the Kalyani town — Kalyani Silpanchal, Kalyani Ghoshpara and Kalyani Simanta. Bandel Junction railway station is 12 kilometres from the city.Other railway stations which are near about 10 Kilometres from the city can also be accessed via the Iswar Gupta Bridge over Hooghly River. They are Adisaptagram Railway Station, Magra Railway Station on the Howrah - Barddhaman Main Line; Tribeni and Bansbaria Railway Station on the Bandel- Katwa Line.

Kalyani is connected directly with Kolkata through Kalyani Expressway, which is currently being expanded to four-lanes. An extension of Kalyani Expressway connects the National Highway 2 near Bansberia through Iswar Gupta Setu.Kalyani is connected directly to Magra and Tribeni Railway Stations via Public Transport and also from Bandel Junction Railway Station by Private Auto and Personal Vehicles. Kalyani is also accessible through National Highway 12, which is around 10 kilometres (6.2 mi) away. Rickshaws, E- rickshaw and Auto-rickshaws are used for local conveyance. Intra-city buses to important cities and towns in West Bengal, including Kolkata and Siliguri are operated by both Government and private operators. Netaji Subhas Chandra Bose International Airport, located around 45 kilometres (28 mi) south, operates domestic and international flights.

== Education ==
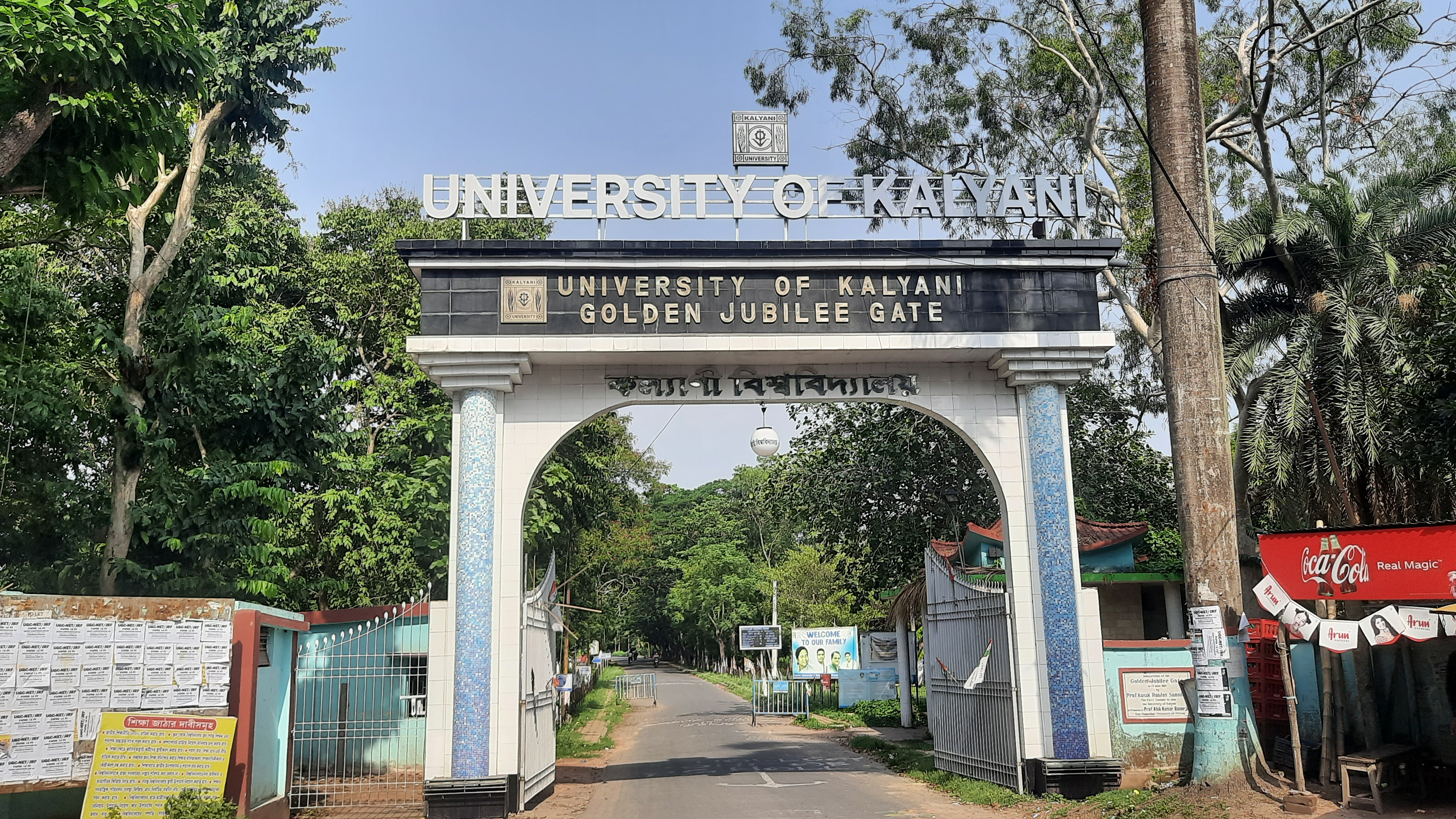
Golden Jubilee Gate, University of Kalyani

Kalyani's schools are run by the state government or private institution. Bengali and English are the primary languages of instruction. Schools in Kalyani follow the "10+2+3" plan. After completing their secondary education, students typically enroll in schools that have a higher secondary facility and are affiliated with the West Bengal Council of Higher Secondary Education, the ICSE, or the CBSE. They usually choose a focus on liberal arts, business, or science. Vocational programs are also available. Among the schools in Kalyani whose mode of instruction is English include Julien Day School, Jawahar Navodaya Vidyalaya, Oriental Public School, Springdale High School, Garden High School, IISER Kolkata Campus (in Mohanpur); while Kalyani University Experimental High School and Pannalal Institution and a lot of other schools instructs in Bengali.

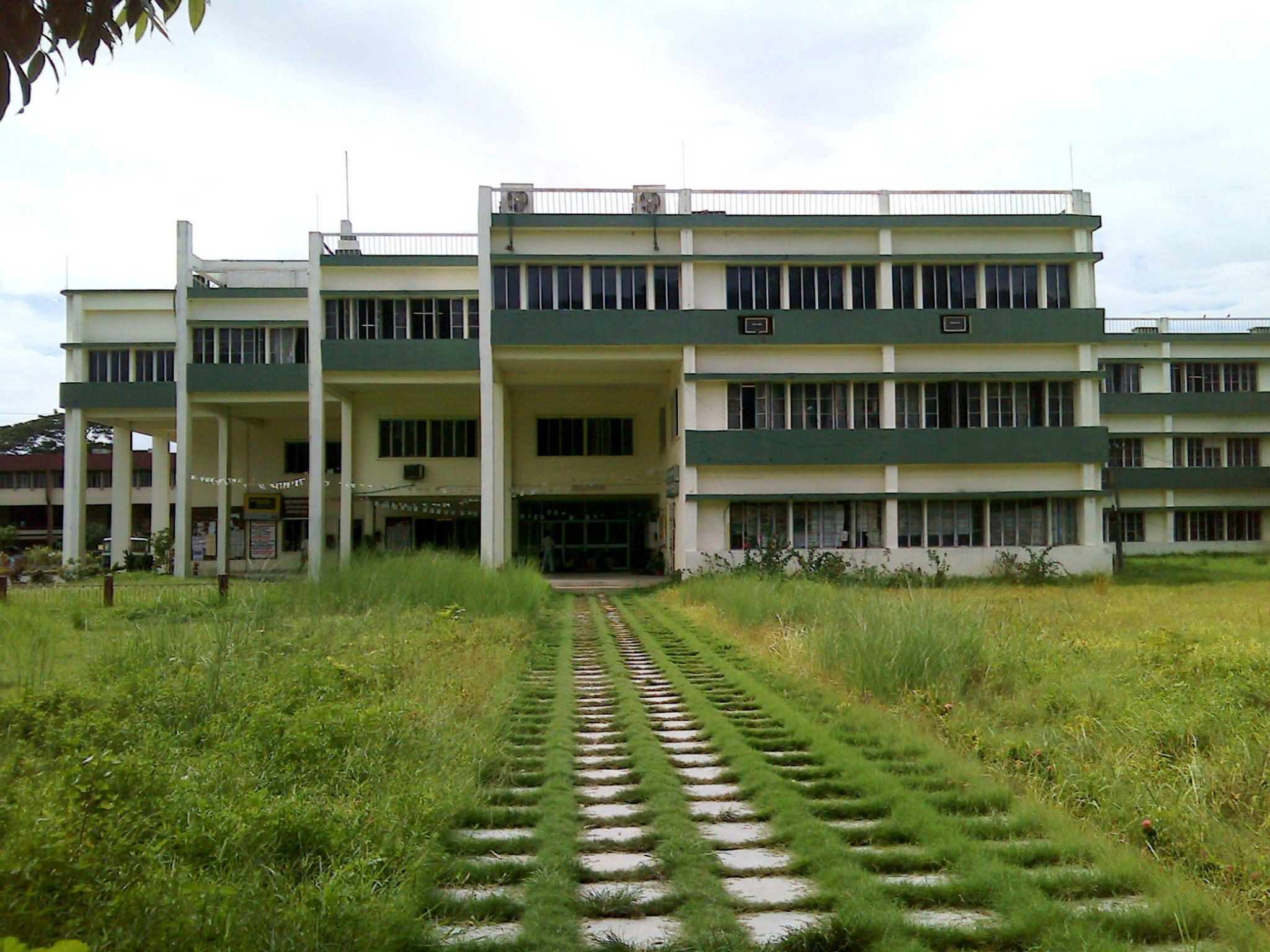
Administrative Building of Bidhan Chandra Krishi Viswavidyalaya

Kalyani has two universities — University of Kalyani and Bidhan Chandra Krishi Viswavidyalaya (BCKV; near Mohanpur), four central institutes of higher importance – Indian Institute of Information Technology, Kalyani, AIIMS Kalyani, BRIC-NIBMG, three engineering colleges – Ideal Institute of Engineering, JIS College of Engineering and Kalyani Government Engineering College. There are 11 colleges out of which there are 2 universities and 3 research centers, one medical college – College of Medicine & JNM Hospital and other institutes of higher education and research, including National Institute of Biomedical Genomics, Eastern Regional Station of National Dairy Research Institute. Kalyani Mahavidyalaya – a general degree college under University of Kalyani and Snahanshu Kanta Acharya Institute of Law are among the other institutes of higher education.

The main campus of the Indian Institute of Science Education and Research, Kolkata (IISER-K) is located close to Kalyani, in Mohanpur. The main campus of BCKV, University college of West Bengal University of Technology is also located at Mohanpur near Kalyani. Clinical training of the students of West Bengal University of Animal and Fishery Sciences are imparted at Mohanpur campus.

== Healthcare ==
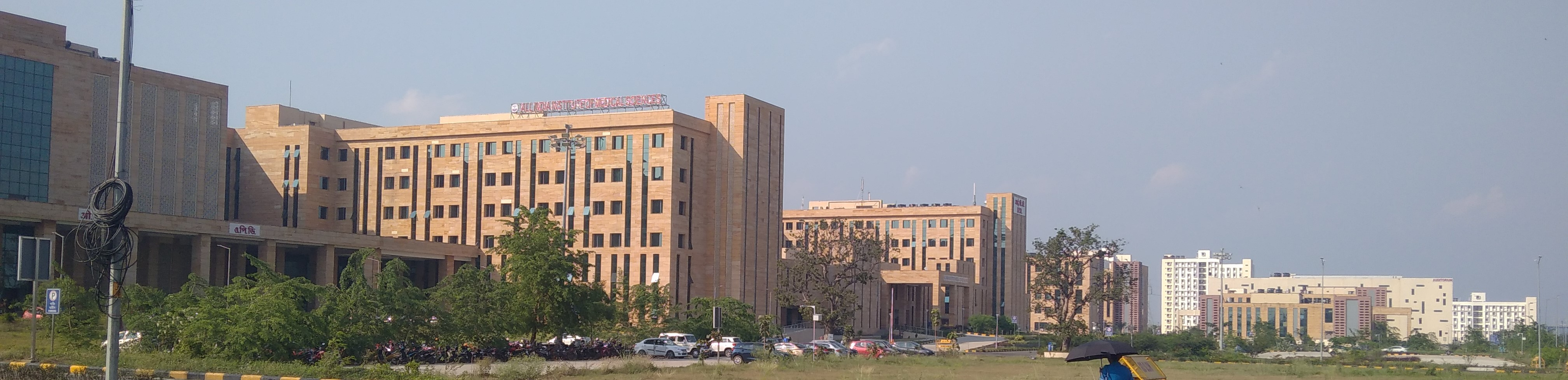
The campus of All India Institute of Medical Sciences, Kalyani.

Healthcare system in Kalyani consists of both government and private healthcare facilities. The Army hospital established during WWII by the American and British alliance was the first hospital in Kalyani. Later former Chief Minister of West Bengal Dr B C Roy converted it into a hospital for tuberculosis patients in the 1960s, currently known as Netaji Subhash Sanatorium. Jawaharlal Nehru Memorial Hospital, a 500-bed hospital, is one of the major hospitals in the town. A medical college, College of Medicine & JNM Hospital, established in 2009, which acts as the University college of West Bengal University of Health Sciences. Gandhi Memorial Hospital has a dedicated cardiac surgery and cardiology department. ESI Hospital provides healthcare to workers under Employees' State Insurance MB Scheme. There is also a branch of National Institute of Homoeopathy with 25 acres herb garden which was established in 1975.

In June 2014, the central government gave in-principle clearance for setting up All India Institute of Medical Sciences, Kalyani at Basantapur village in the Saguna Panchayat in Kalyani. This project was shifted from earlier plans of setting up the AIIMS at Raiganj because of problems in land acquisition. The project was completed in 2019.

== Sports ==
Bengal Cricket Academy Ground, a cricket ground, hosts national level and club level cricket matches. It is also the home ground of Bengal cricket team. Kalyani Stadium hosts national level football matches. The Kolkata clubs Mohun Bagan, East Bengal FC, Mohammedan S.C. and United SC use Kalyani Stadium as their home ground in some national level matches. A swimming pool and well-equipped gymnasium are also attached with the stadium.

== Gallery ==
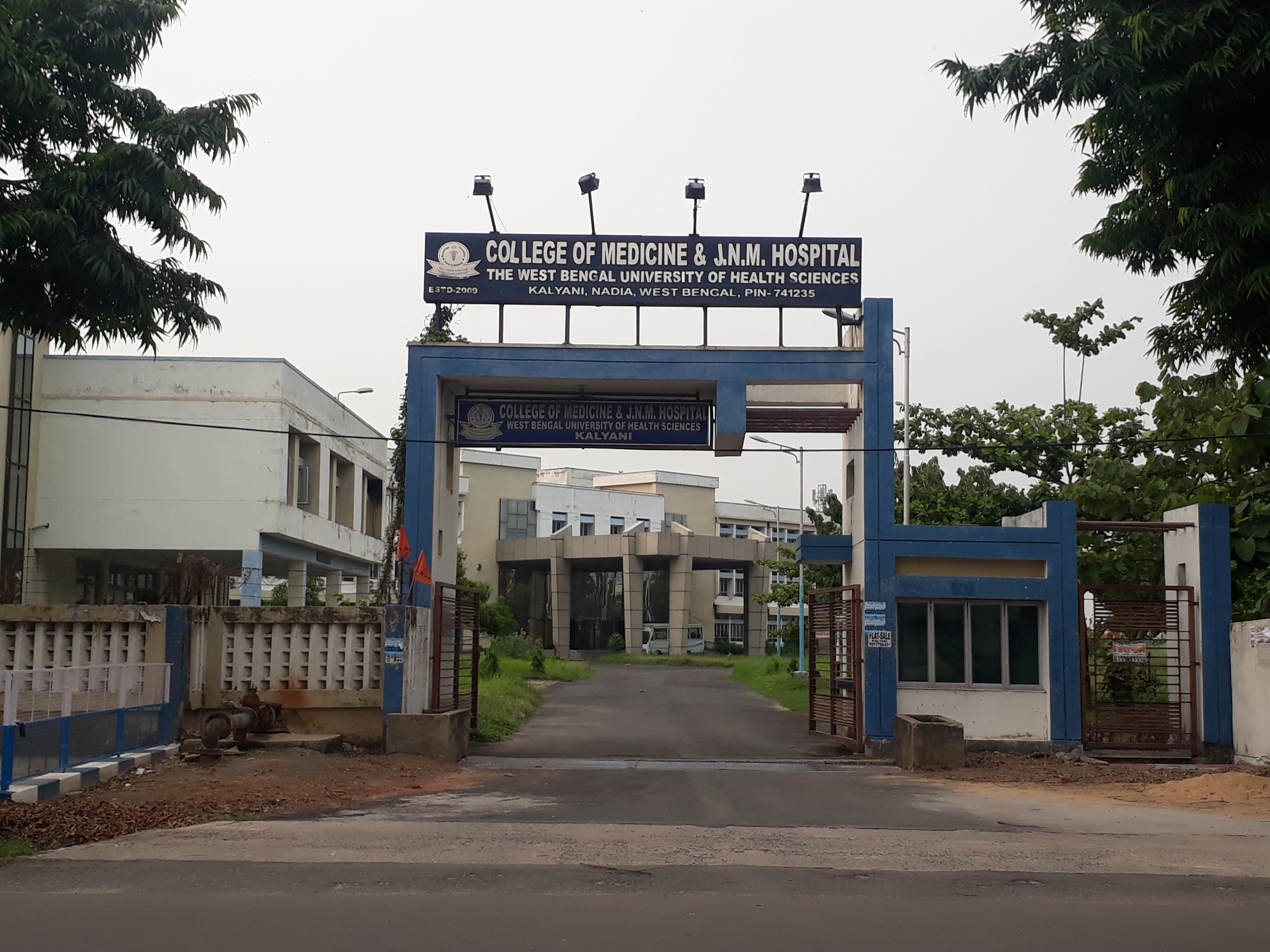
College of Medicine & JNM Hospital

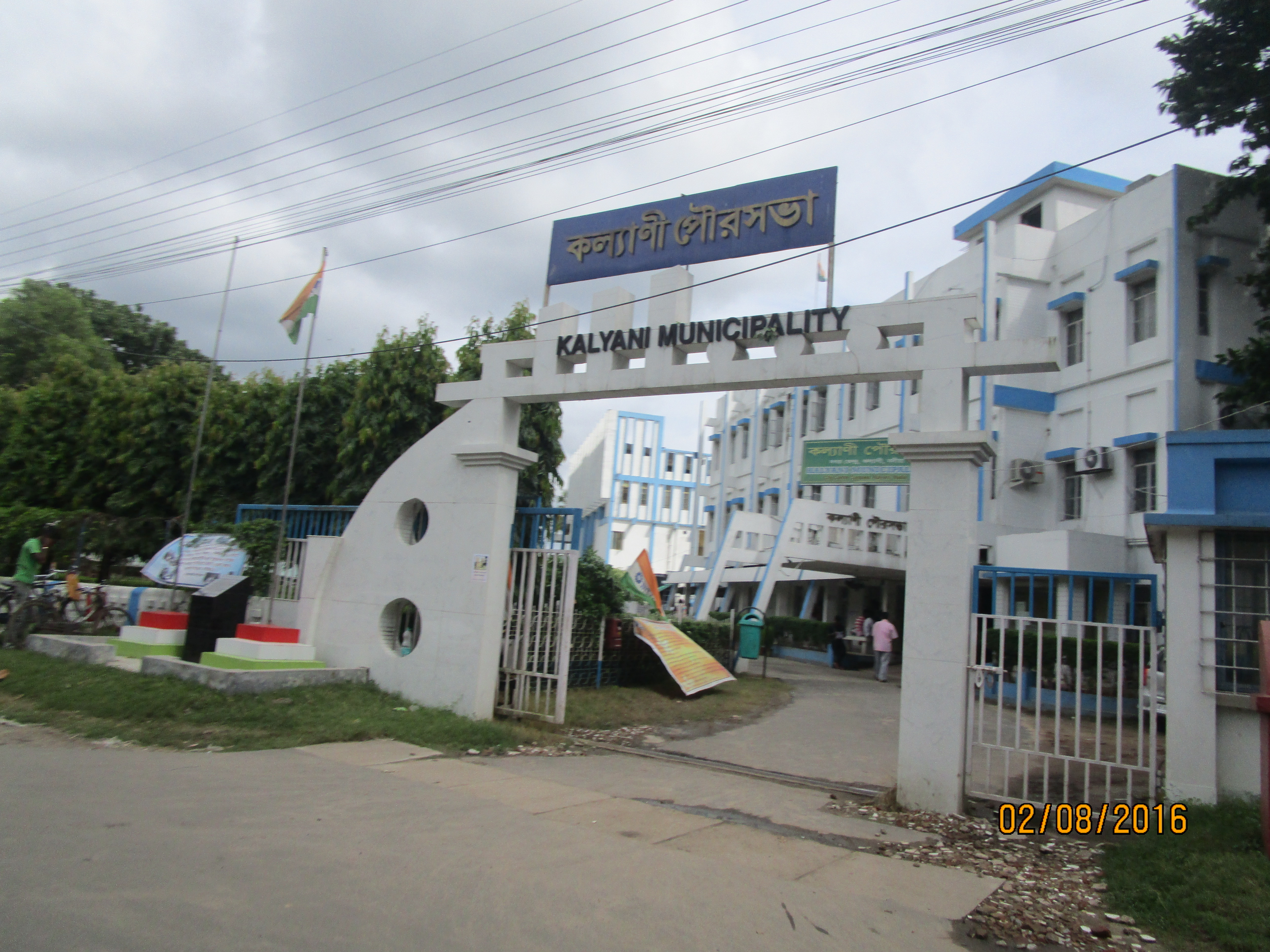
Kalyani Municipality

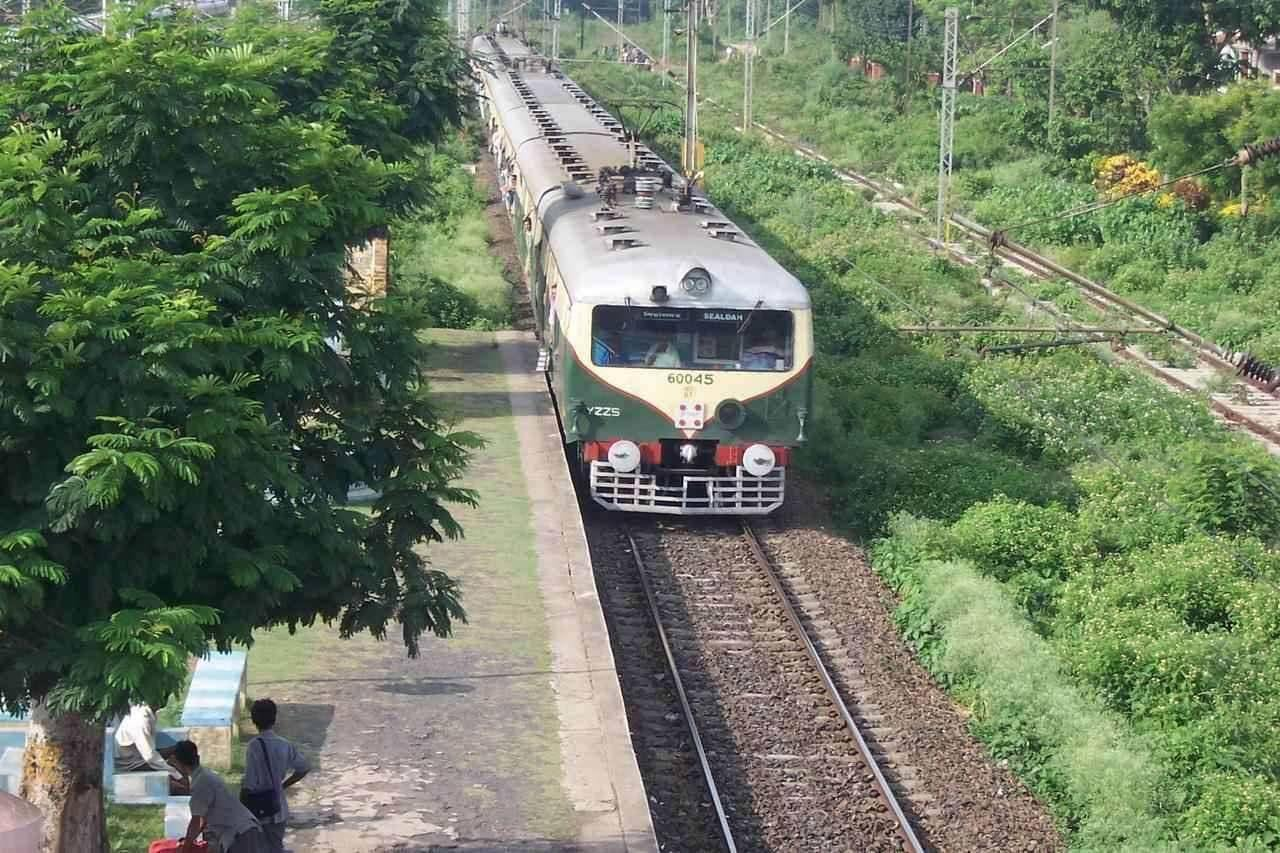
A Sealdah bound train at Kalyani railway station

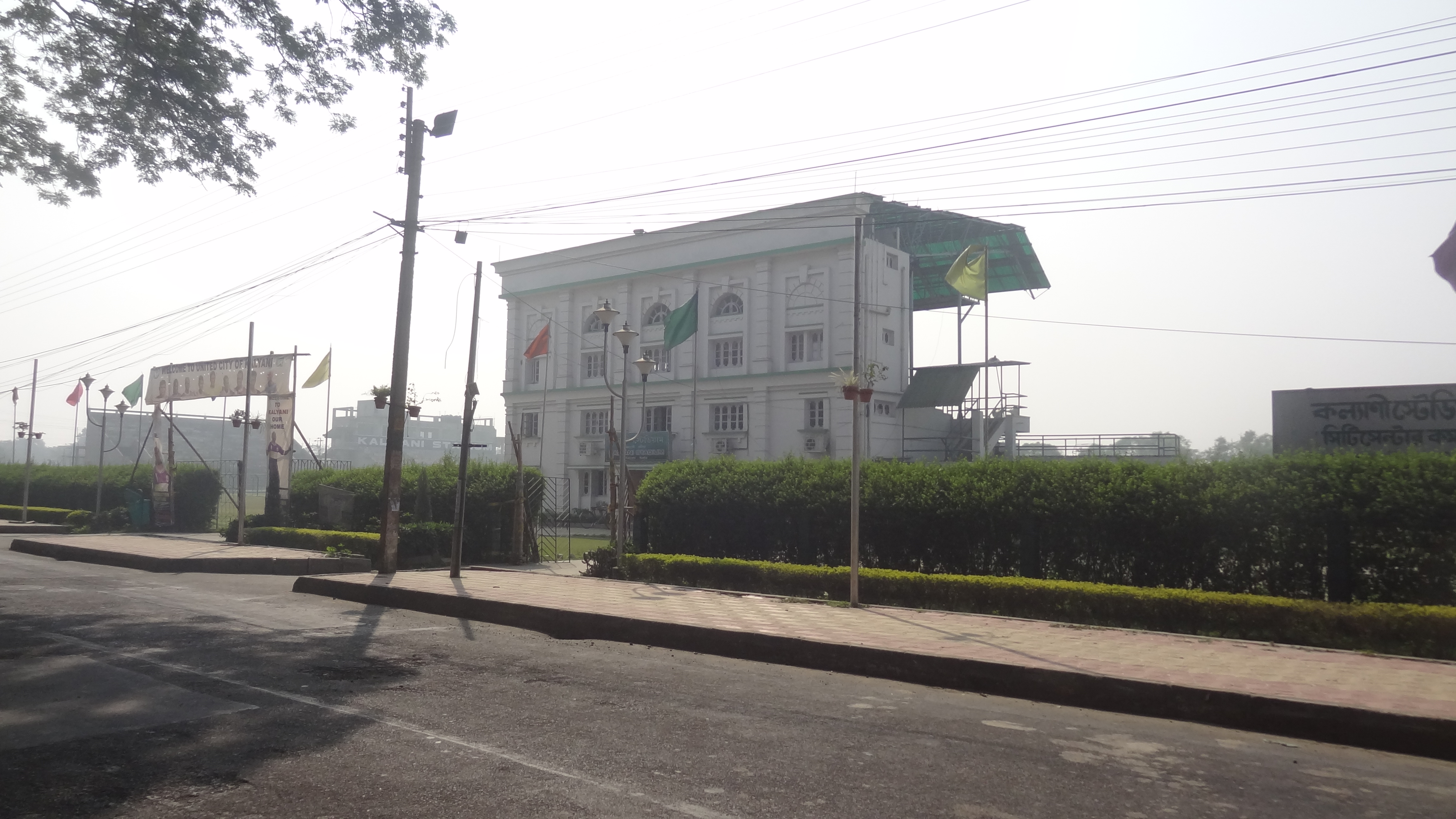
Kalyani Stadium

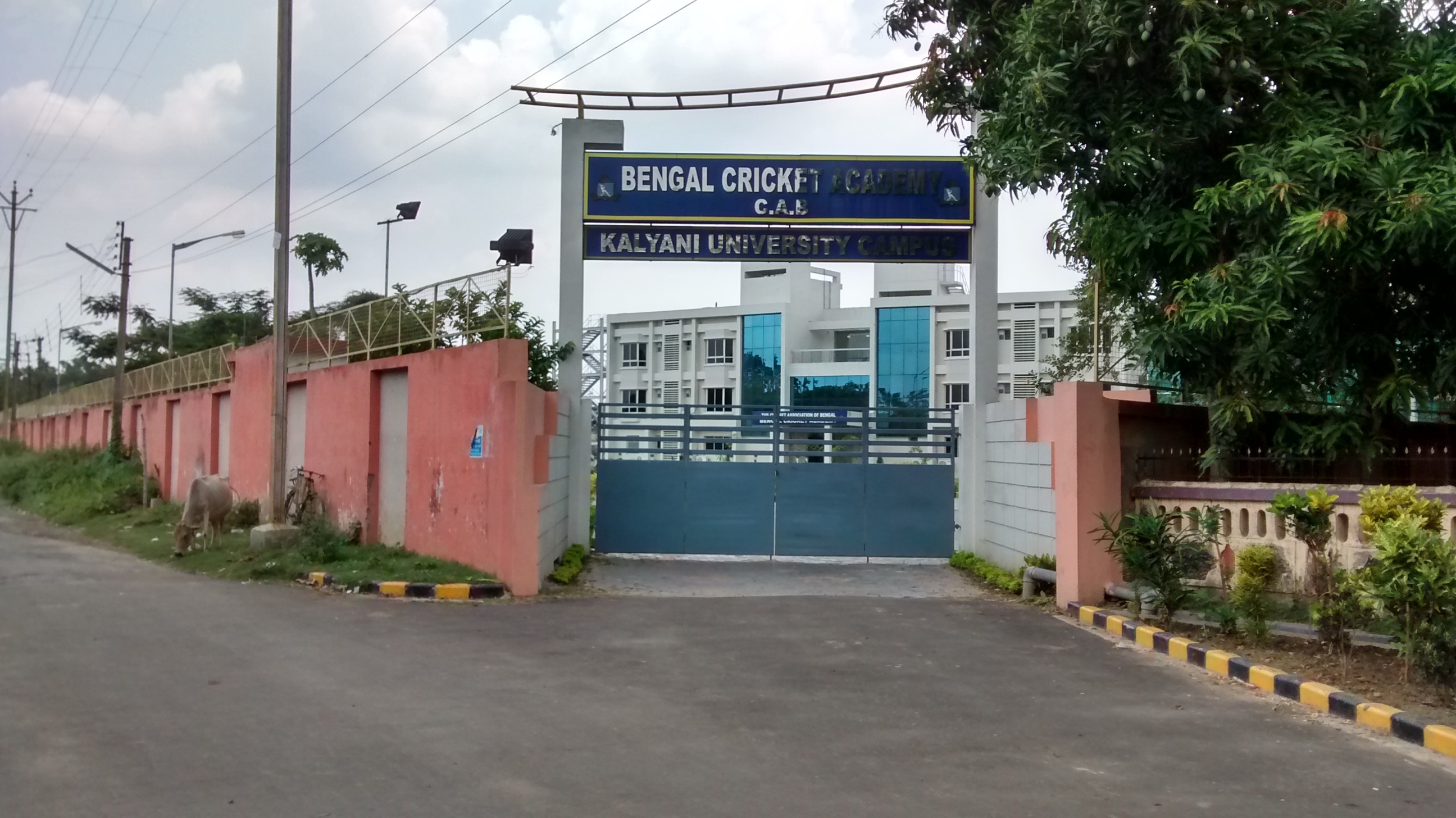
Bengal Cricket Academy Ground, Kalyani

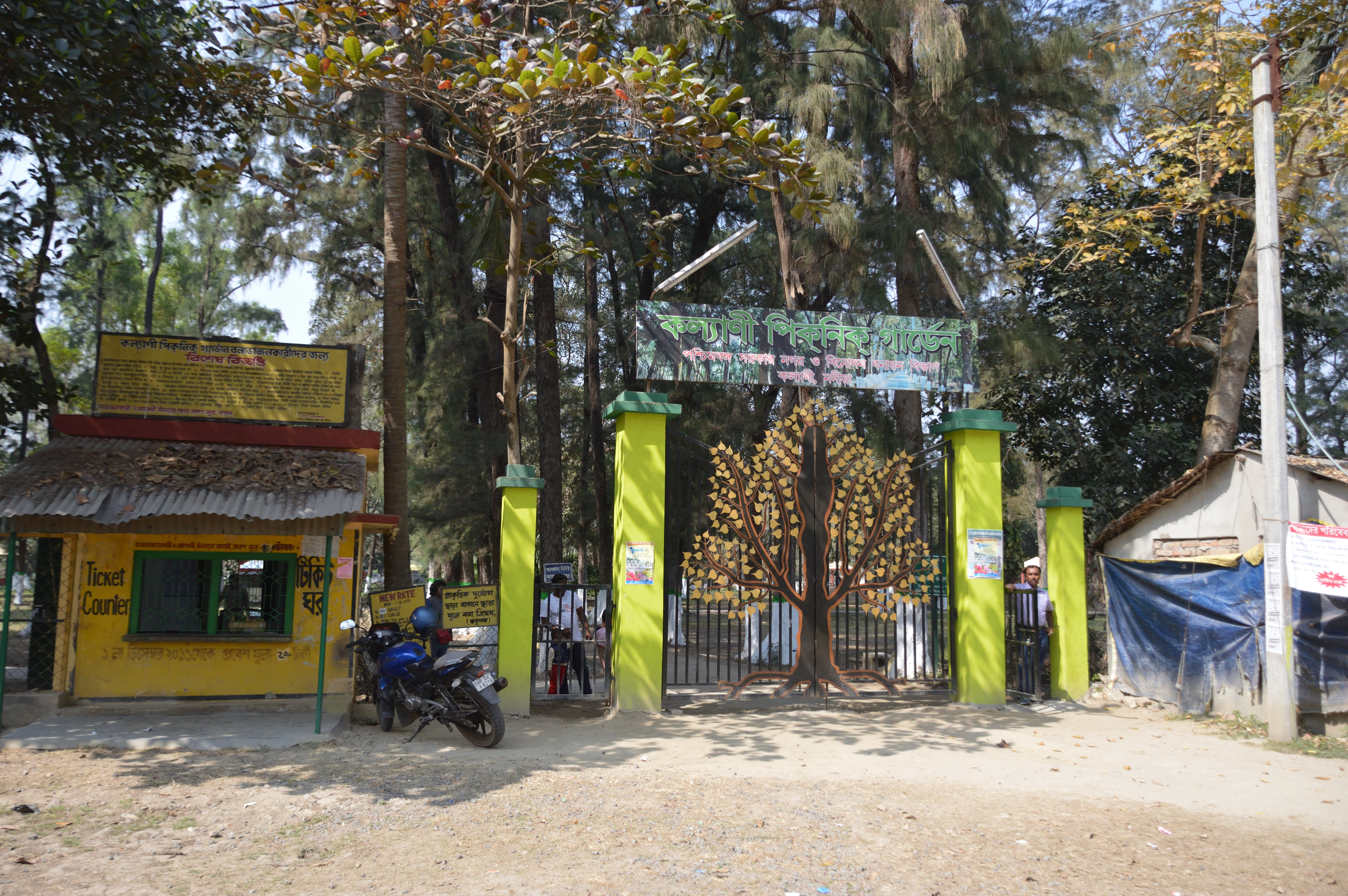
Kalyani Picnic Garden

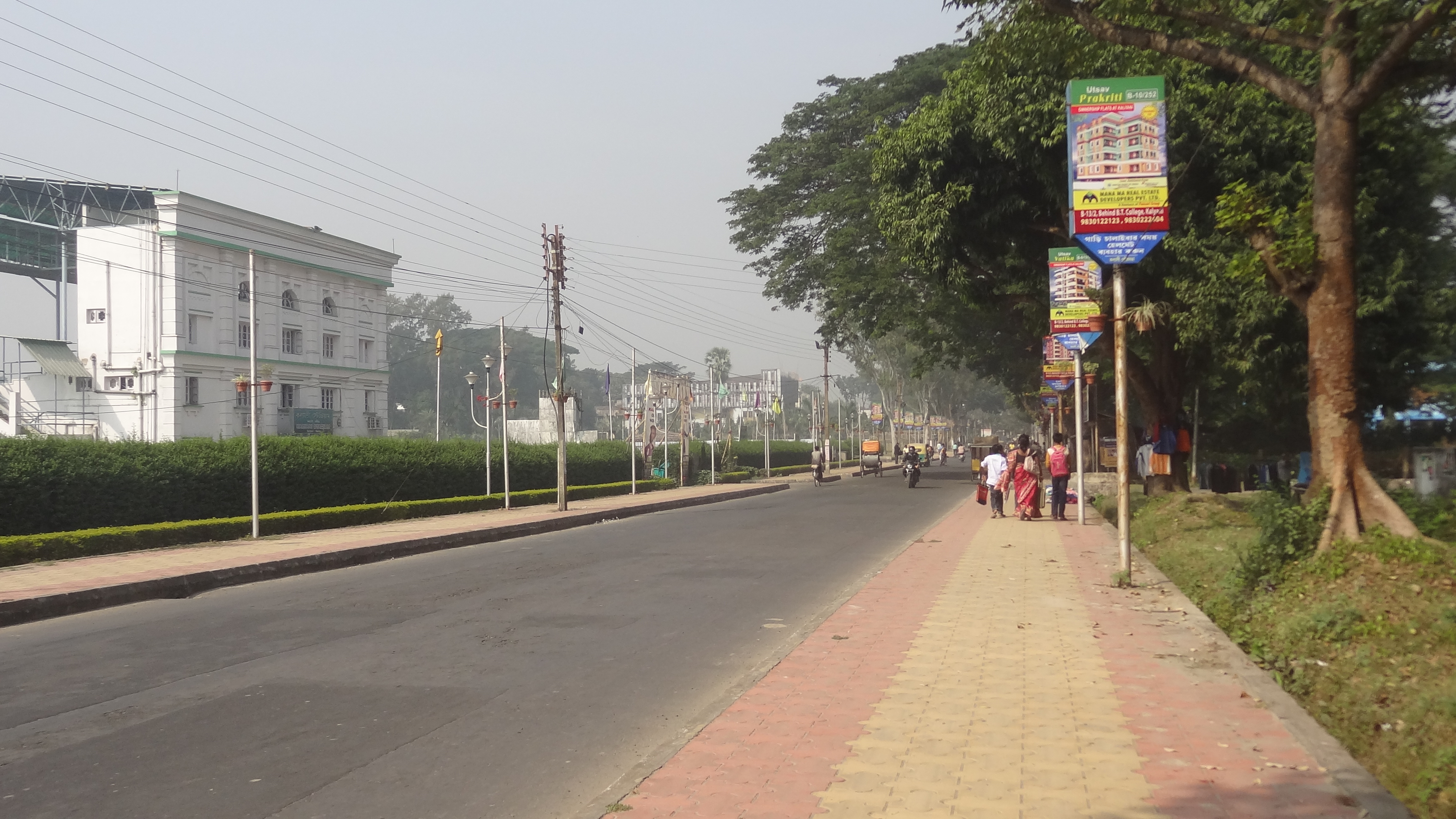
A-B Connector, Kalyani

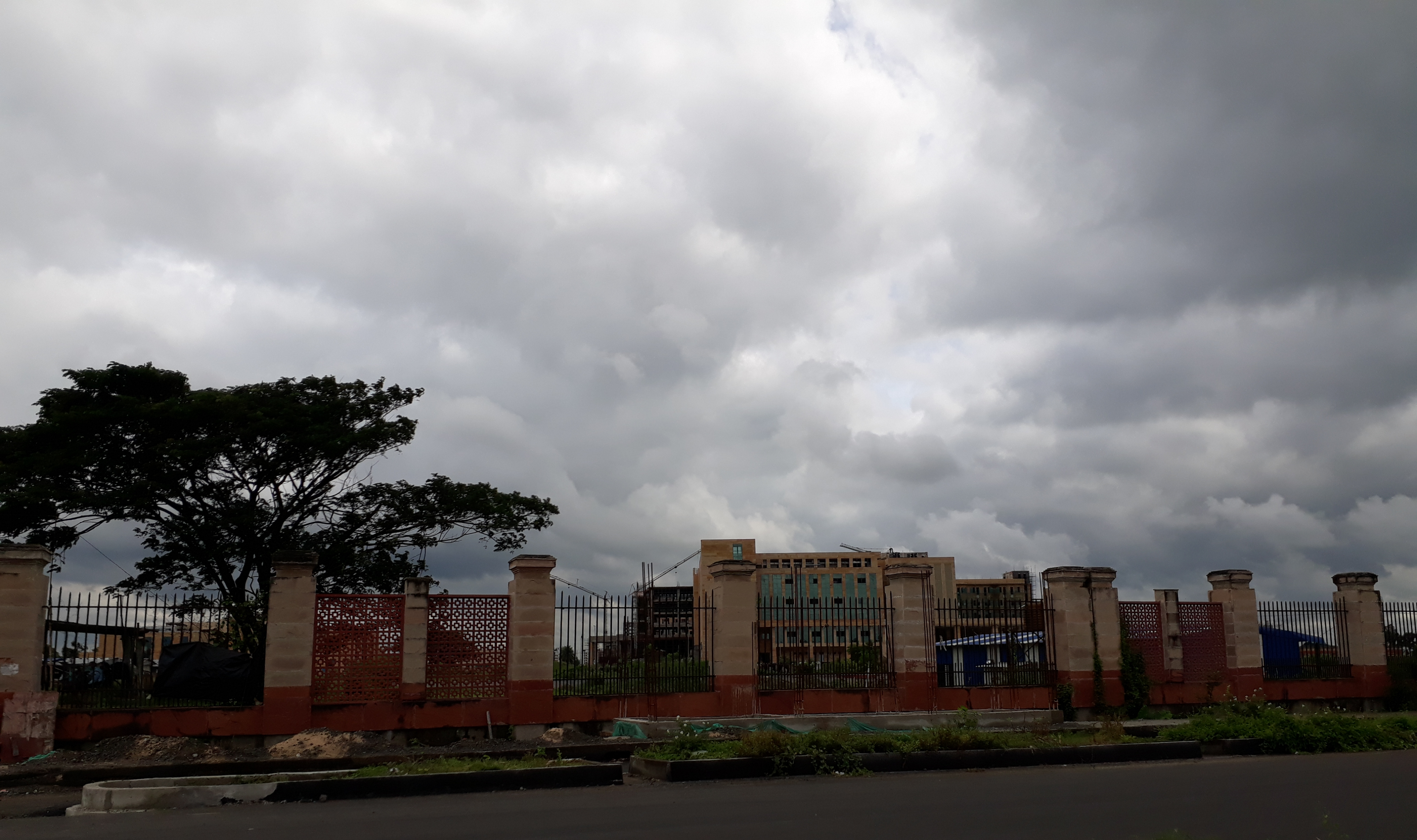
AIIMS in Kalyani

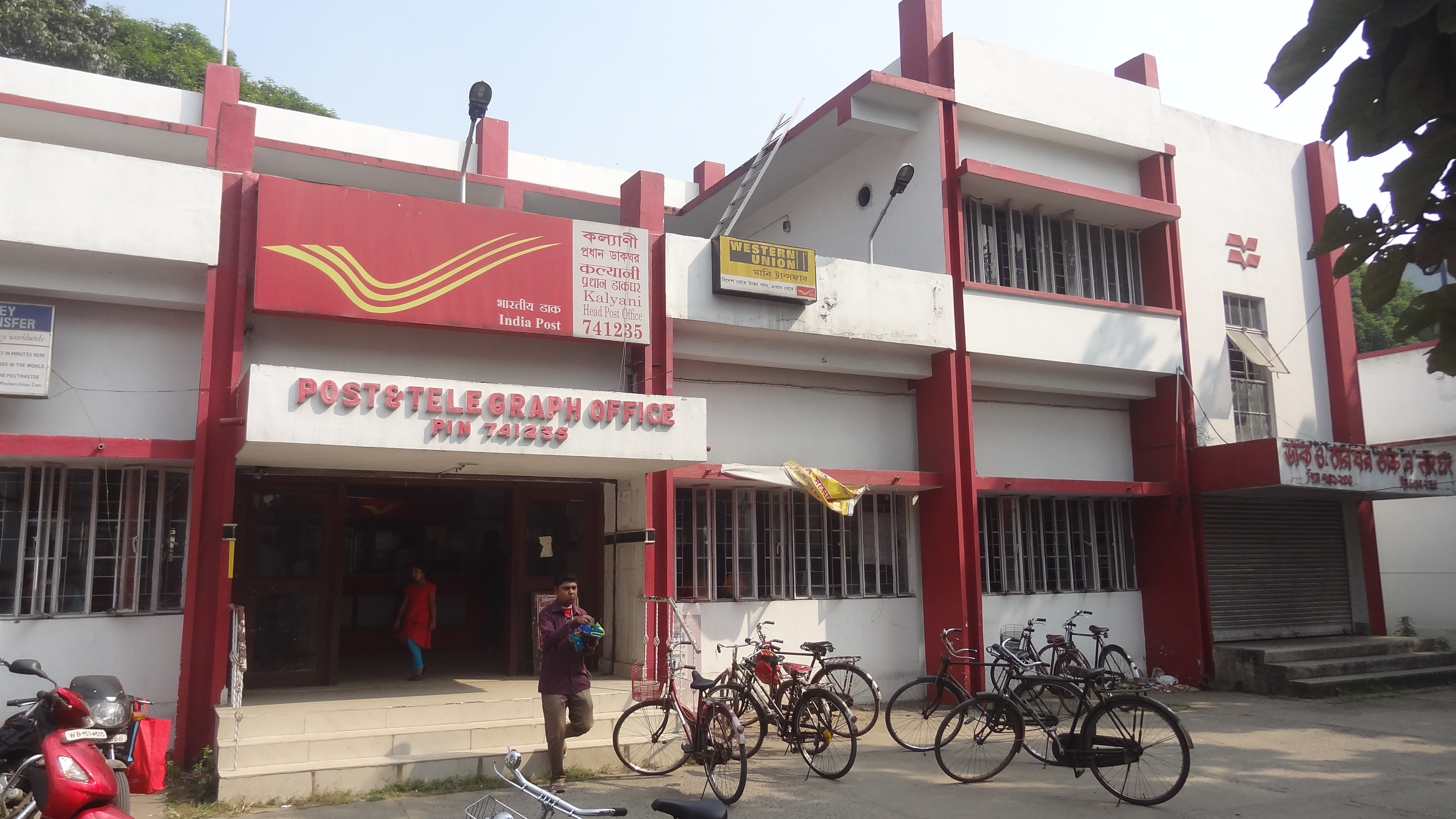
Kalyani Head Post Office

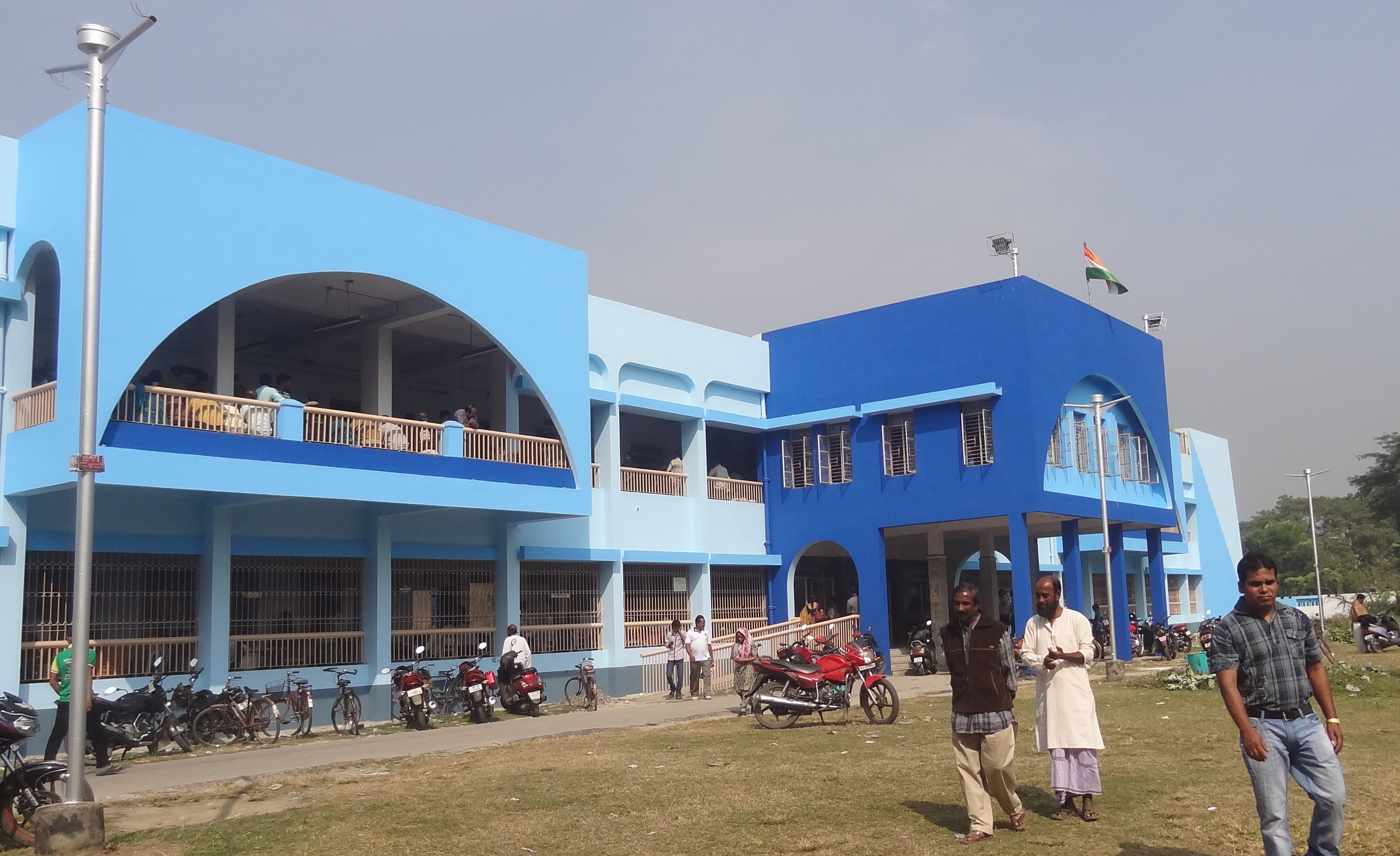
Kalyani Sub Divisional Court
