= Kalyani railway station =

Railway Station in West Bengal, India

Kalyani
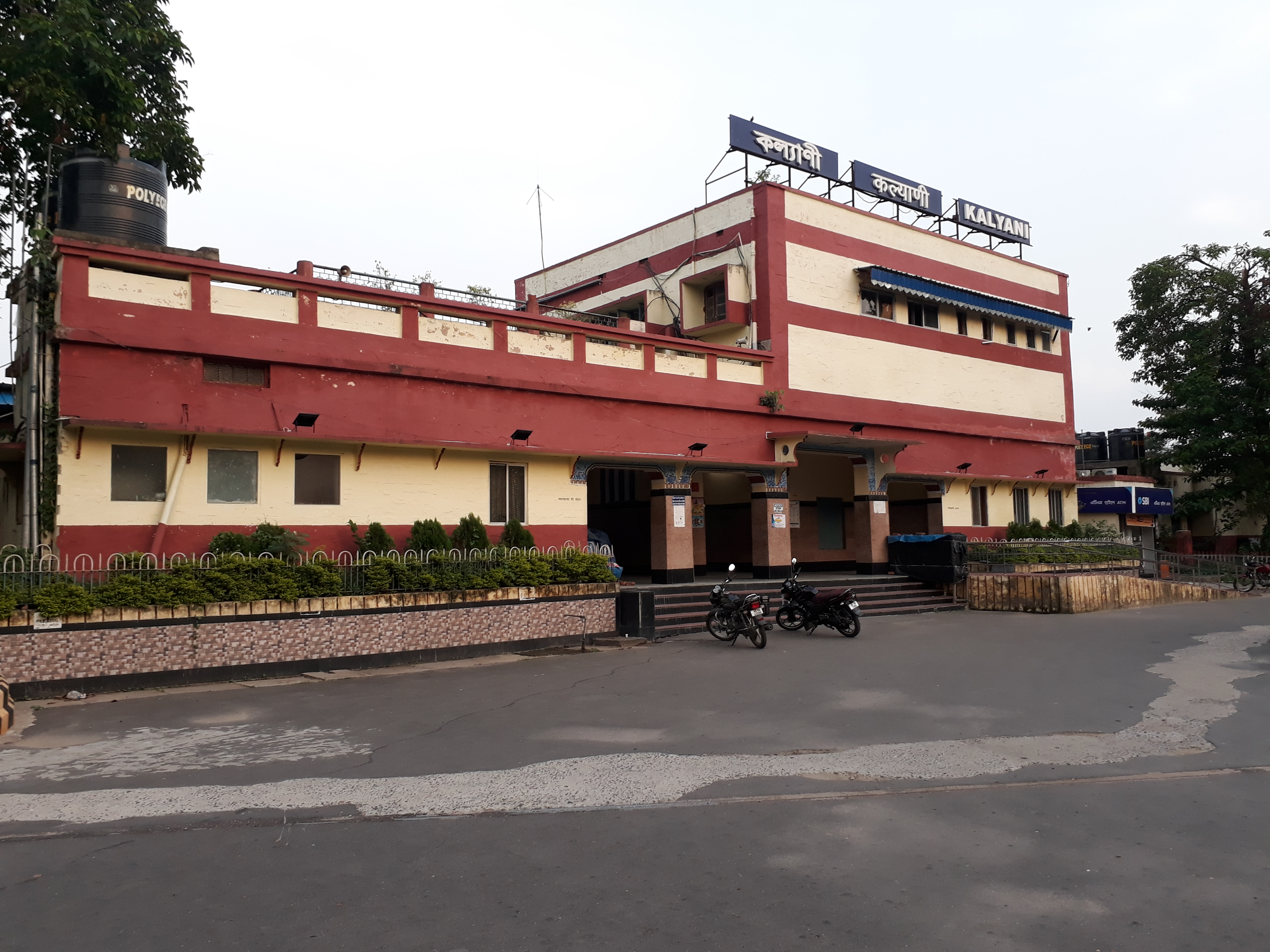
- Kalyani railway station

General information
- Location: Station Road, Kalyani, Nadia, West Bengal; India
- Coordinates: 22.968963°N 88.467575°E
- Elevation: 13 metres (43 ft)
- System: Kolkata Suburban Railway
- Owner: Indian Railways
- Operator: Eastern Railway
- Lines: Sealdah–Ranaghat line Kalyani-Kalyani Simanta link
- Platforms: 4
- Tracks: 8

Construction
- Structure type: Standard (on-ground station)
- Parking: Available
- Cycle facilities: Available
- Accessible: Available

Other information
- Status: Functioning
- Station code: KYI
- Zone(s): Eastern Railway
- Division(s): Sealdah

History
- Opened: 1862; 164 years ago
- Rebuilt: 1953; 73 years ago
- Electrified: 22 October 1963; 62 years ago
- Former names: Chandmari Halt railway station under Eastern Bengal Railway

Services
Preceding station	Kolkata Suburban Railway	Following station
Kanchrapara towards Sealdah	Eastern Line Main line	Kalyani Silpanchal towards Kalyani Simanta
Kanchrapara towards Sealdah	Eastern Line Main line	Madanpur towards Gede
Route map
Location
- Location within West Bengal Location within India

Kalyani railway station is a Kolkata Suburban Railway station in Kalyani, West Bengal on the Sealdah–Ranaghat line and Kalyani Simanta branch line. It is located in Nadia district in the Indian state of West Bengal. It serves Kalyani and the surrounding areas.

== History ==
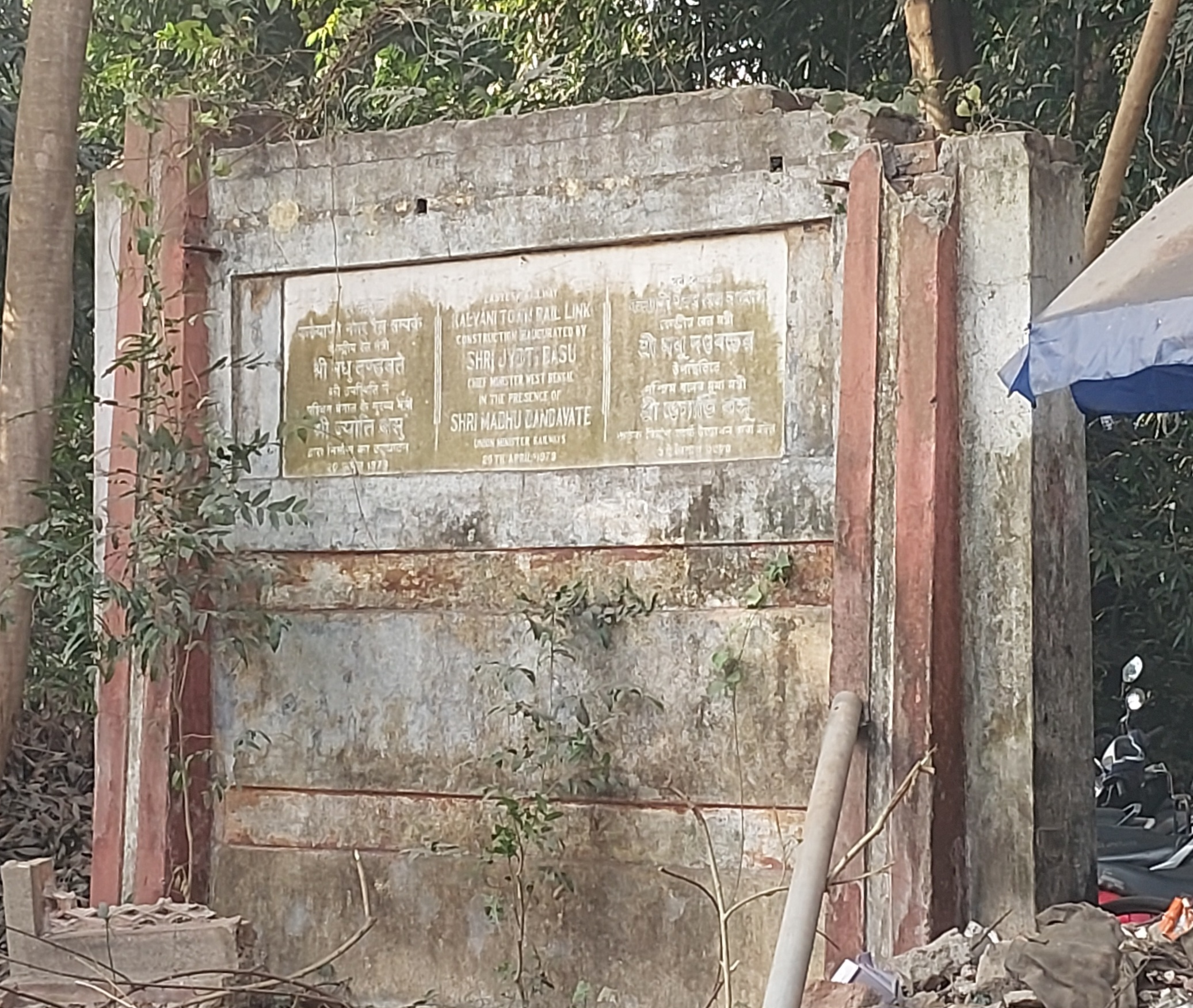
Kalyani Simanta branch line memorial

The Calcutta (Sealdah)–Kusthia line of Eastern Bengal Railway was opened to run in the year of 1862. Eastern Bengal Railway worked on the eastern side of the Hooghly River. The British Government in India established the railway station in the then Roosvelt town named Chandmari Halt in 1883. In 1953 it was renamed into Kalyani. On 7 April 1979, an existing industrial spur was extended and electrified to Kalyani Simanta station and also established direct connectivity to Kolkata through Kalyani Simanta local EMU trains. The distance between Sealdah and Kalyani main station is 48 km. Services of Kalyani Local started on 1963 after completion of electrification of Sealdah–Kalyani section. EMUs of that age were push-pulled by WAM-2 due to shortage of rakes. Initially, all the EMUs were 8 car rakes, namely TC-SC-SC-SC-WAM2-SC-SC-SC-TC combinations. Later, they were converted into 9 car rakes.

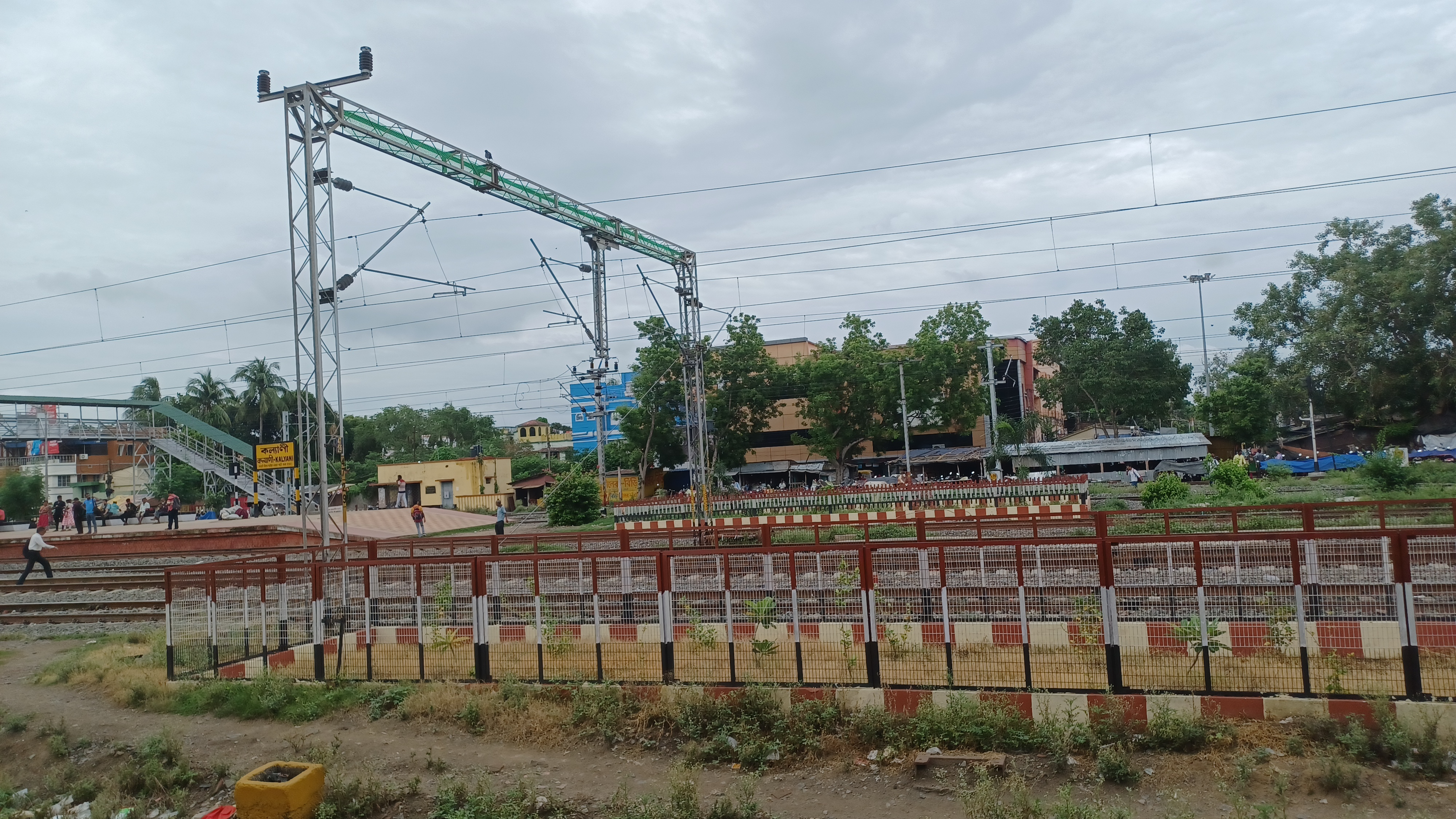
View of Kalyani Railway station from Platform 4

== Electrification ==
The Sealdah–Ranaghat route was electrified in the period of 1963–64. Suburban traffic first started as Naihati Local and Kalyani local for the first time .
