= JIS College of Engineering =

Engineering College of West Bengal, India

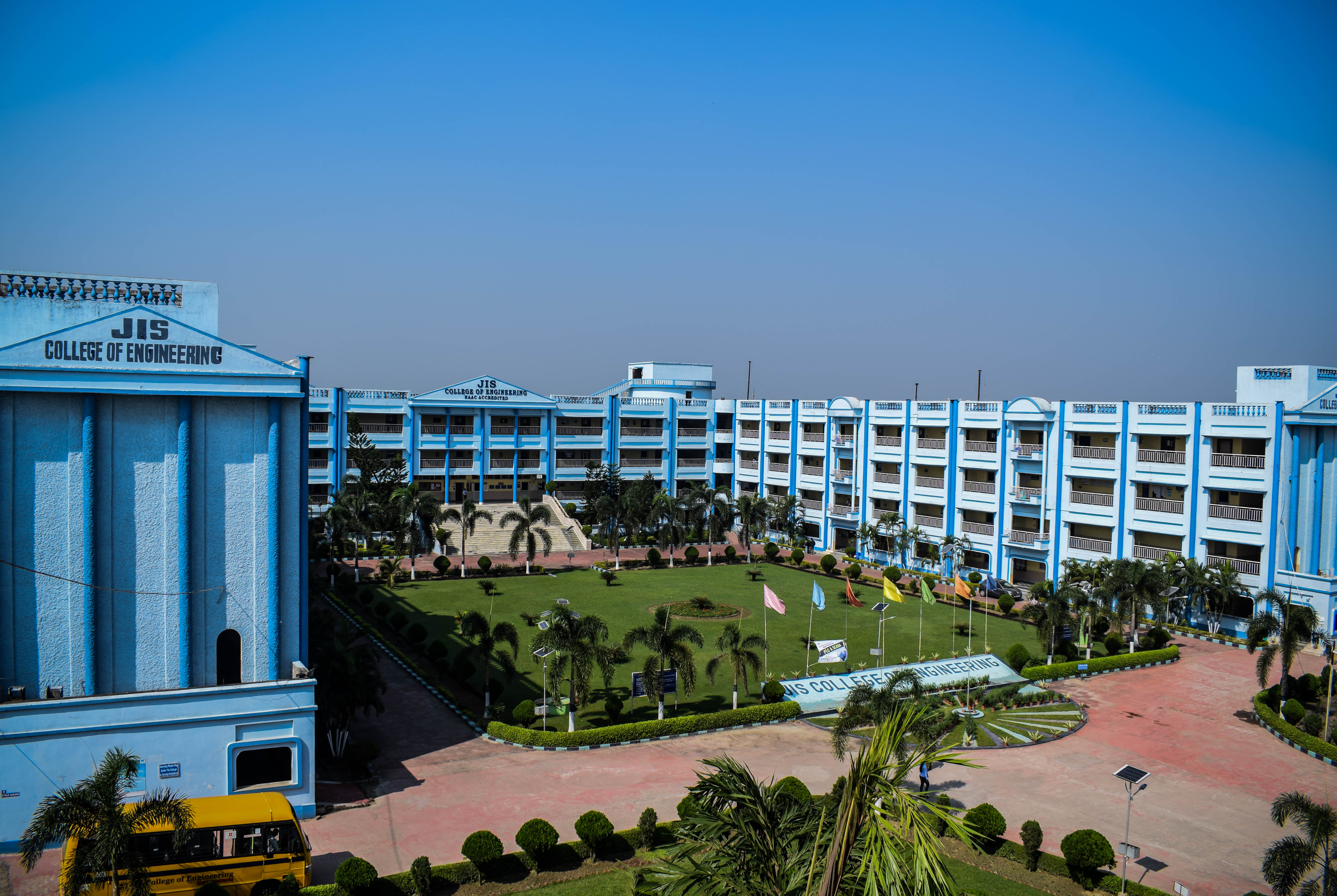
- JISCE Campus
- Type: Engineering college
- Established: 2000; 26 years ago
- Founder: Sardar Jodh Singh
- Parent institution: JIS Group Educational Initiatives
- Affiliations: MAKAUT; AICTE; NAAC; NBA
- Principal: Partha Sarkar
- Location: Block A, Phase III, Kalyani, West Bengal, 741235, India; 22.9592018°N 88.4466785°E
- Campus: Urban
- Website: www.jiscollege.ac.in

- Location within West Bengal Location within India

JIS College of Engineering is a college located in Kalyani, West Bengal, India. The college was established in 2000.The Institution is declared Autonomous by the University Grants Commission (UGC) in 2011. In 2022, the college was accredited by NAAC with Grade-A. It is affiliated to Maulana Abul Kalam Azad University of Technology, West Bengal (MAKAUT, WB). The institute is ranked by NIRF in the range of 201–250 in 2021. In the Atal Ranking of Institutions on Innovation Achievements (ARIIA) 2020, the institute has secured a place in Band B (Rank Between 26th–50th) among Private or Self-Financed College/Institutes in India. On 1 September 2020, the institute celebrated its 20th Birthday.

== Programs ==
=== Engineering ===
- B. Tech Agricultural Engineering
- B. Tech Biomedical Engineering
- B. Tech Civil Engineering
- B. Tech Computer Science and Engineering
- B. Tech Computer Science and Technology
- B. Tech Computer Science and Engineering (AI & ML)
- B. Tech Electrical Engineering
- B. Tech Electronics and Communication Engineering
- B. Tech Information Technology
- B. Tech Mechanical Engineering
- M. Tech Computer Science and Engineering
- M. Tech Electrical Devices & Power System
- M. Tech Mechanical Engineering
- M. Tech Mobile Communication and Networking Technology
- Diploma in Electrical Engineering
- Diploma in Mechanical Engineering

=== Management ===
- MBA
- BBA
- BBA in Digital Marketing
- BBA in Hospital Management
- B.Sc. in Hospitality and Hotel Administration

=== Computer Application ===
- MCA
- BCA

== See also ==
- List of institutions of higher education in West Bengal
- Education in India
- Education in West Bengal
