= Kalyani Ghoshpara railway station =

Railway station in West Bengal, India

Kalyani Ghoshpara
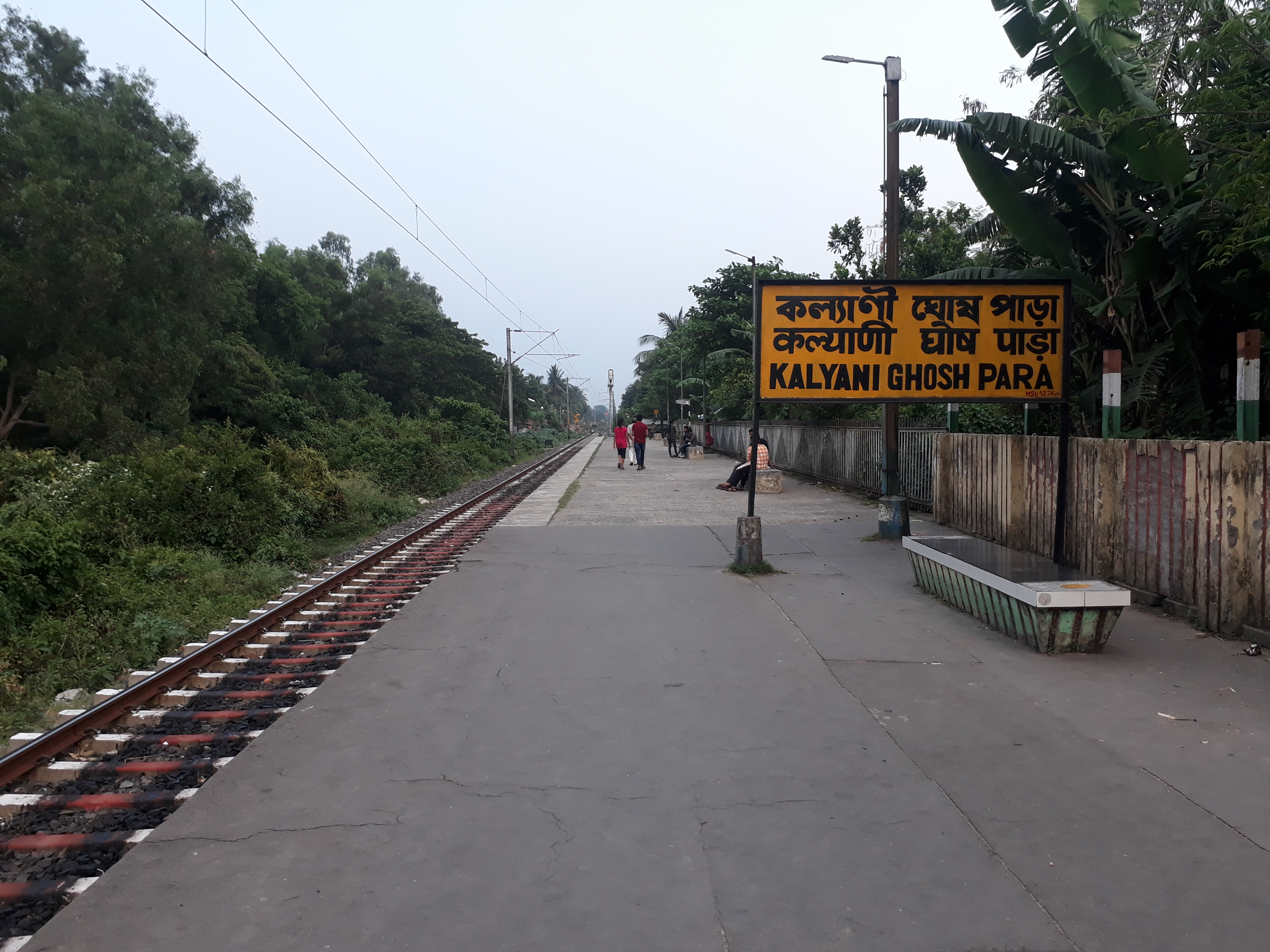
- Kalyani Ghoshpara railway station

General information
- Location: Ghoshpara Station Road, Kalyani, Nadia district, West Bengal; India
- Coordinates: 22.981785°N 88.439769°E
- Elevation: 12 metres (39 ft)
- System: Kolkata Suburban Railway
- Owner: Indian Railways
- Operator: Eastern Railway
- Line: Kalyani–Kalyani Simanta link
- Platforms: 1
- Tracks: 1

Construction
- Structure type: Standard (on-ground station)
- Parking: Available
- Cycle facilities: Not available
- Accessible: Not available

Other information
- Status: Functioning
- Station code: KLYG
- Zone(s): Eastern Railway
- Division(s): Sealdah

History
- Opened: 1979
- Electrified: 1979

Services
| Preceding station | Kolkata Suburban Railway | Following station |
|---|---|---|
| Kalyani Silpanchal towards Sealdah | Eastern Line Main line | Kalyani Simanta Terminus |
Route map
Location
- Location within West Bengal Location within India

Kalyani Ghoshpara railway station is a Kolkata Suburban Railway station on the Kalyani Simanta Branch line of Sealdah railway division. It is situated at Ghoshpara Road, Kalyani in Nadia district in the Indian state of West Bengal. It serves Ghoshpara, Kalyani University, ITI College and B Block area of the city.

== History ==
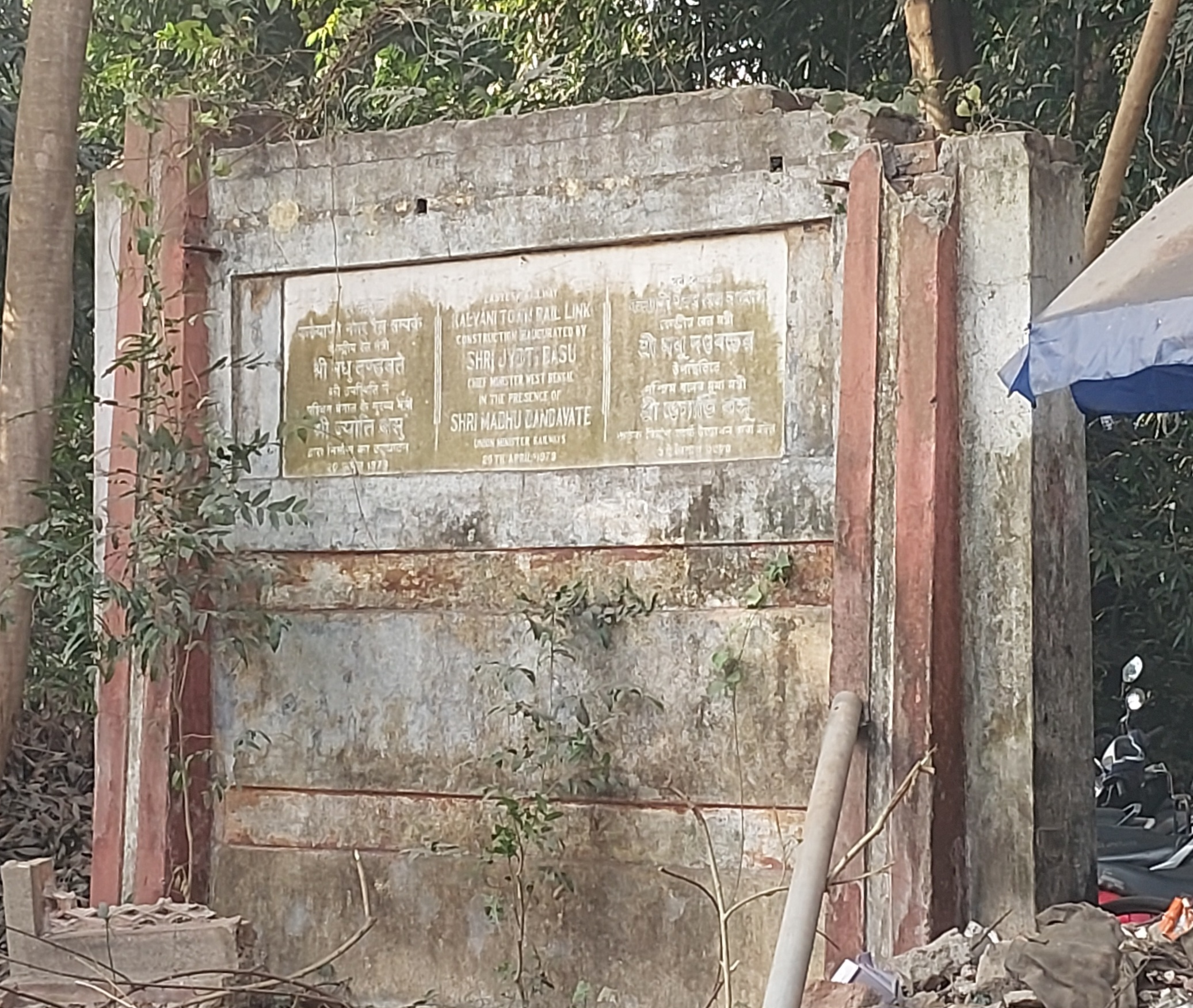
Kalyani Simanta branch line memorial

The Calcutta (Sealdah)–Kusthia line of Eastern Bengal Railway was opened to run in the year of 1862. British Government in India established the railway station in the then Roosvelt town named Chandmari Halt in 1883. In 1954 it was renamed into Kalyani. In 1979, the rail line was extended from Kalyani main station to Kalyani Simanta railway station and also established direct connectivity to Sealdah through Kalyani Simanta local EMU trains.
