= Kalyani Simanta railway station =

Railway station in West Bengal, India

Kalyani Simanta
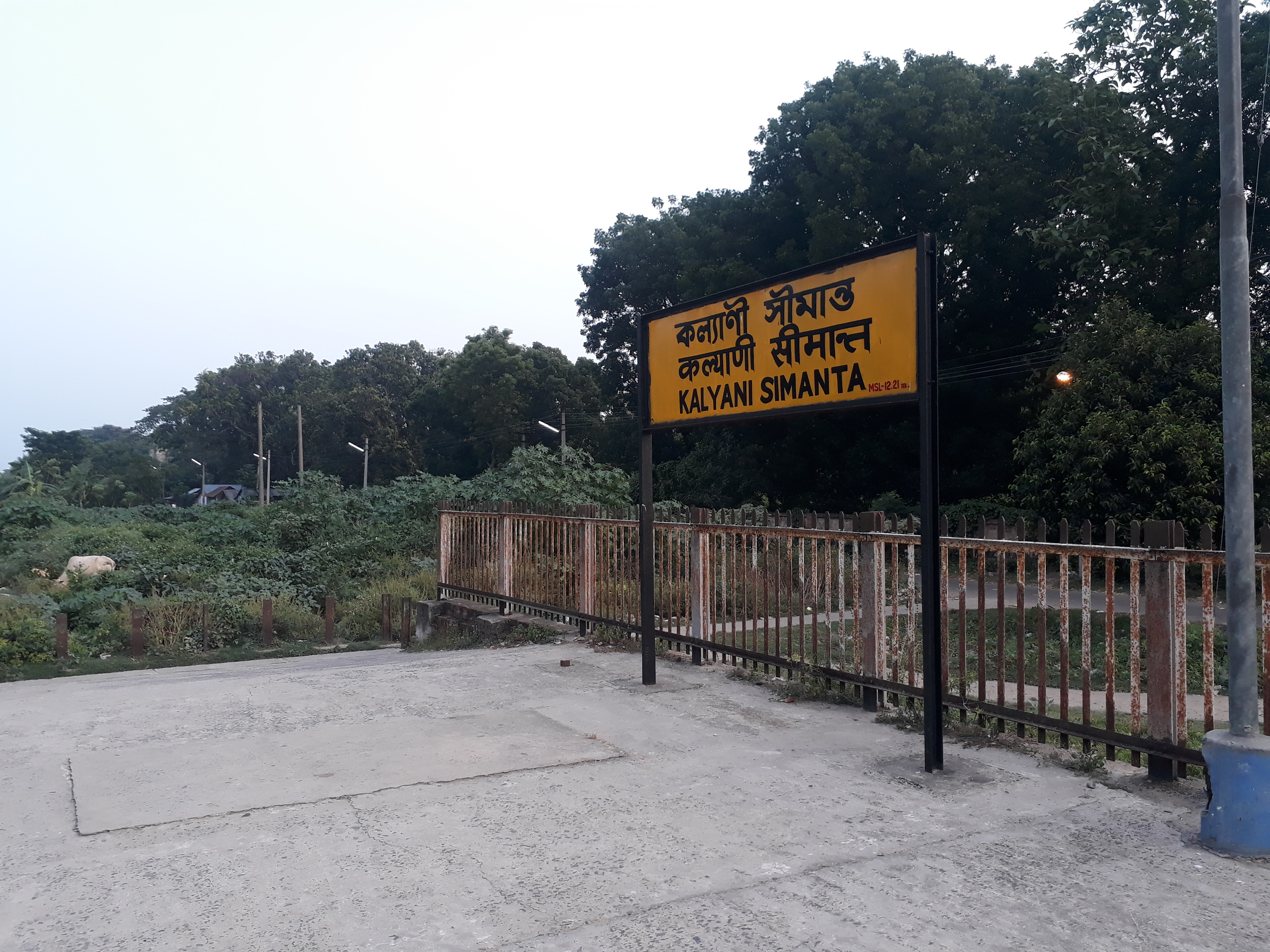
- Kalyani Simanta railway station

General information
- Location: A-B Connector, Kalyani, Nadia district, West Bengal; India
- Coordinates: 22.987760°N 88.428014°E
- Elevation: 12 metres (39 ft)
- System: Kolkata Suburban Railway
- Owner: Indian Railways
- Operator: Eastern Railway
- Line: Kalyani–Kalyani Simanta link
- Platforms: 1
- Tracks: 1

Construction
- Structure type: Standard (on-ground station)
- Parking: Available
- Cycle facilities: Not available
- Accessible: Not available

Other information
- Status: Functioning
- Station code: KLYM
- Zone(s): Eastern Railway
- Division(s): Sealdah

History
- Opened: 1981
- Electrified: 1981

Services
| Preceding station | Kolkata Suburban Railway | Following station |
|---|---|---|
| Kalyani Ghoshpara towards Sealdah | Eastern Line Main line | Terminus |
Route map
Location
- Location within West Bengal Location within India

Kalyani Simanta railway station is the Kolkata Suburban Railway station and terminal station of Kalyani Simanta branch line of Sealdah railway division. It is situated beside A-B Connector, Kalyani in Nadia district in the Indian state of West Bengal.

== History ==
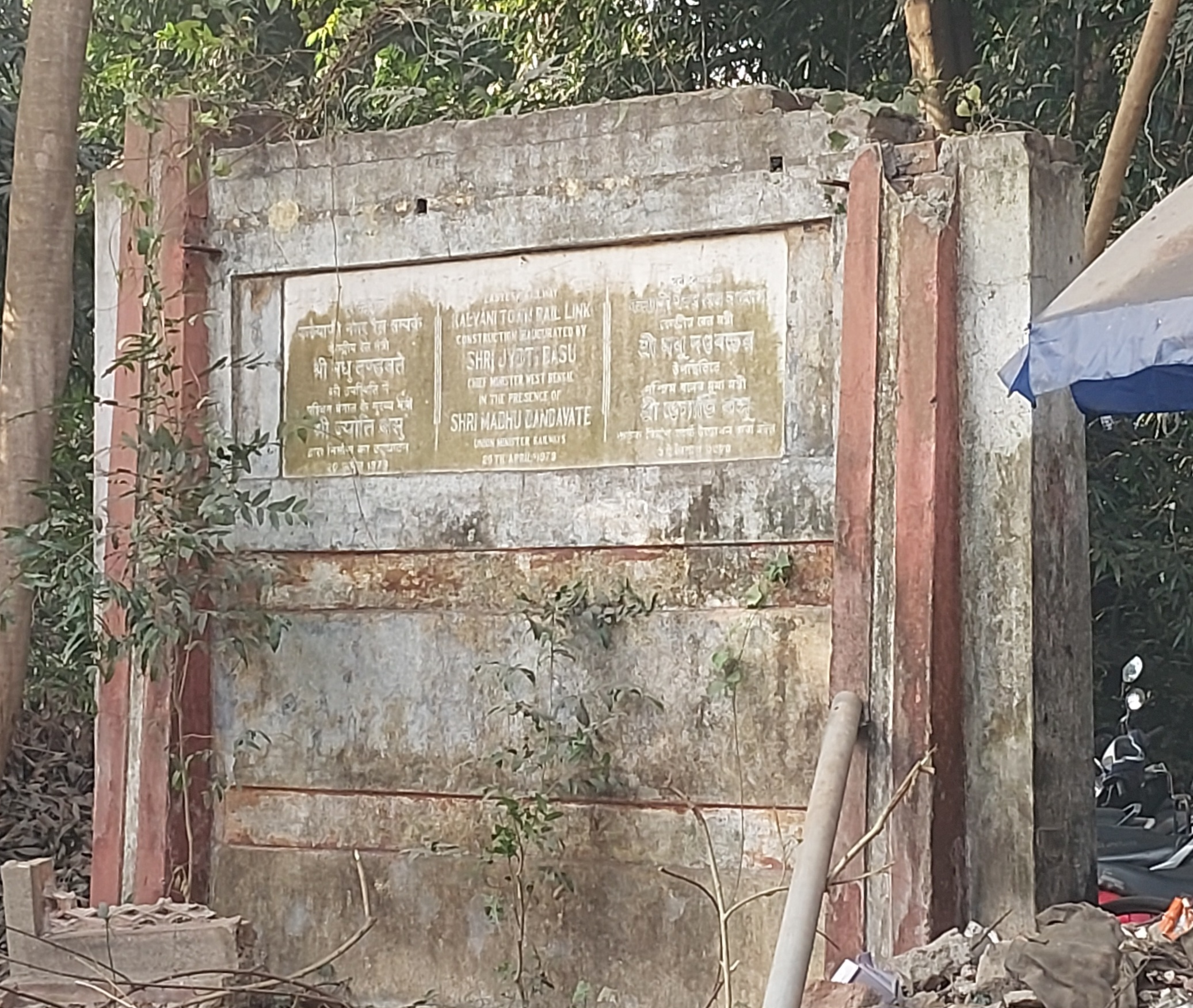
Kalyani Simanta branch line memorial

The Calcutta (Sealdah)–Kusthia line of Eastern Bengal Railway was opened to run in the year of 1862. British Government in India established the railway station in the then Roosvelt town named Chandmari Halt in 1883. In 1954 it was renamed into Kalyani. In 1979, the rail line was extended from Kalyani main station to Kalyani Simanta and also established direct connectivity to Sealdah through Kalyani Simanta local EMU trains.
