= Gauhati Medical College and Hospital =

Medical college and hospital in Guwahati, Assam

- Other names: GMC, GMCH
- Type: Public medical school
- Established: September 20, 1960; 65 years ago
- Affiliations: Srimanta Sankaradeva University of Health Sciences; NMC
- Principal: Dr. Babul Kumar Bezbaruah
- Location: Bhangagarh, PO Indrapur 781032, Guwahati, Assam, India; 26.1600676°N 91.7680237°E
- Website: gmch.assam.gov.in

The Gauhati Medical College and Hospital, the second medical college to be established in Assam, is a health care institution. It provides medical education at Undergraduate, Postgraduate and Superspecialty level.

== History ==
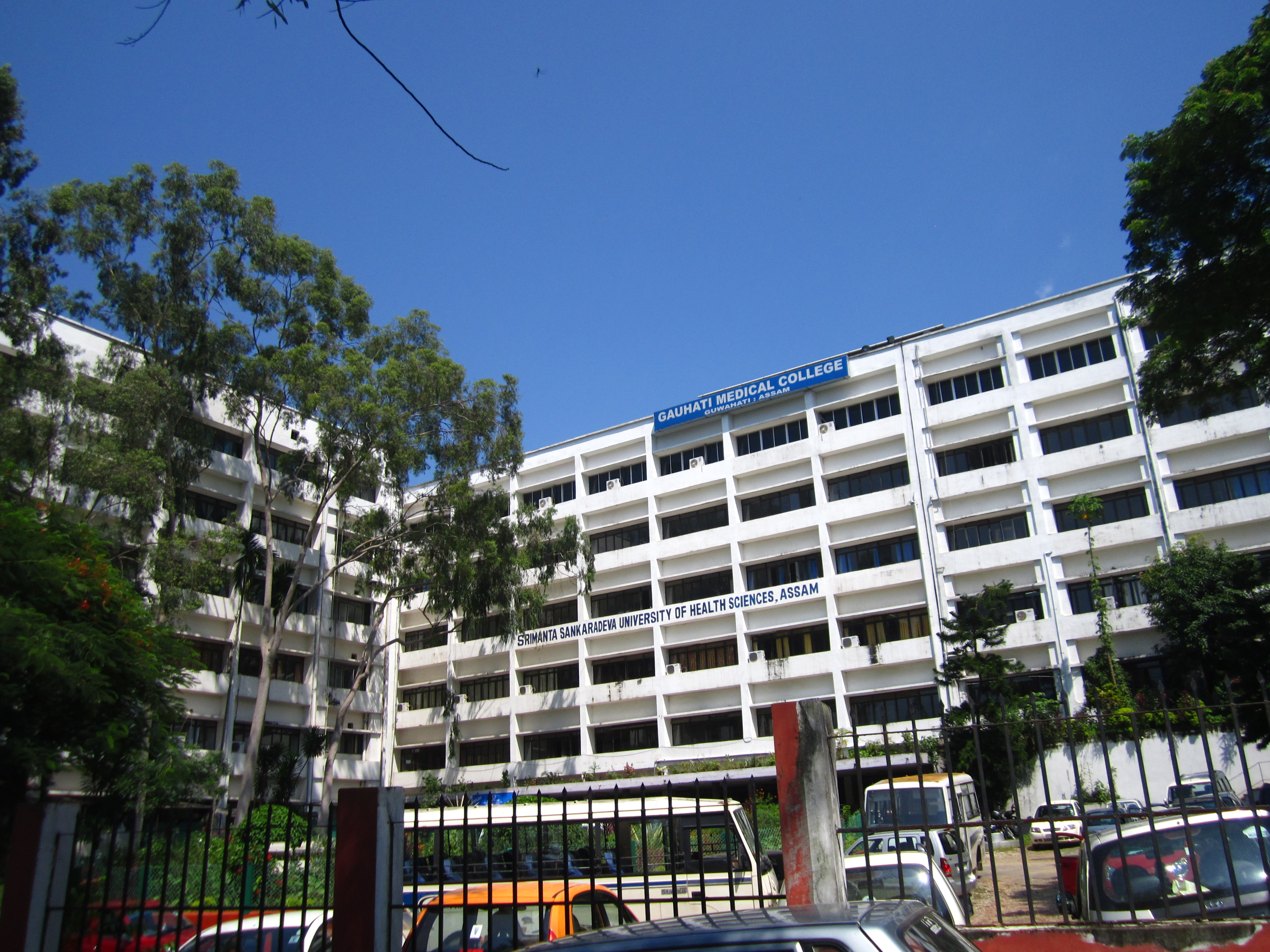
Gauhati medical College front view

Dr. John Berry White, MRCS, a British surgeon of the East India Company, was the pioneer of health education and health care in Assam. He established a medical school known as 'Berry White Medical School' in Dibrugarh, Assam in 1898–99. The school was upgraded and on 3 November 1947, the Assam Medical College, Dibrugarh, was established and it stands as the first medical college in Assam.

With increasing demands for health care and health education, the need for more medical colleges in Assam was felt. In 1959, the state government, headed by Bimala Prasad Chaliha, the then Chief Minister of Assam, Fakaruddin Ali Ahmed (Finance Minister), and Rup Nath Brahma (Minister of Health and Family Welfare of Assam), decided to have a second medical college in Assam. On 7 November 1959, the state government set up a committee to look into the matter and submit their report.

After several rounds of discussions, the committee visited sites at Ulubari, Jalukbari, Chandmari, and other areas of the city of Guwahati, as well as parts of Silchar. The committee submitted its report on 26 April 1960, stating that it was feasible to start the Gauhati Medical College from August 1960 in the vacant Ayurvedic College buildings and the Physical Education Training buildings at Jalukbari in Guwahati. However, no such place was immediately available at Silchar to start the Silchar Medical College. The committee recommended Ulubari as the permanent site for Gauhati Medical College and Ghungoor as the permanent site for Silchar Medical College.

Then, the state government started the colleges with preclinical classes in the vacant buildings of the Ayurvedic College at Jalukbari, Guwahati, enrolling 60 students for Gauhati Medical College and 40 students for Silchar Medical College, which operated as twin colleges. By a state government order no. MM-D/275/60/45 dated 26 June 1960, Dr. S.N. Sarma, the Principal and Superintendent of Assam Medical College & Hospital, Dibrugarh, was entrusted with starting the preclinical classes at Jalukbari from August 1960 and overseeing the establishment of medical colleges at Gauhati and Silchar, in addition to his duties at the Assam Medical College, Dibrugarh.

Accordingly, the vacant Ayurvedic College buildings at Jalukbari were taken over and arrangements were started by August 1960. On 20 September 1960, the functioning of the Gauhati Medical College was formally inaugurated. The first batch of the 100 students were interviewed and selected in the AMC, Dibrugarh in the last week of September 1960. Preclinical classes were started from 10 October 1960.

There was no provision for staff and students at Jalukbari. At Chandmari, about 15 km. away from Jalukbari, 73 tenements of the Industrial Housing Colony, some vacated houses of the Civil Surgeon's office, and also some vacated houses of the Engineering Institute were acquired where accommodations were provided to the staff and students who did not have their accommodations elsewhere at Guwahati. Students and staff were transported in government buses from Chandmari to Jalukbari and back. Lady students were accommodated in Ayurvedic College hostel building when available. Subsequently, two temporary barracks were also built in the Physical Education Training building at Jalukbari where second year students were accommodated while the first year students had to come as before.

The Gauhati Medical College (GMC) took its start under the stewardship of Professor I. Jahan from October 1960 to June 1961. Professor S.N. Sarma was transferred from AMC, Dibrugarh and he took over the charge of the Office of the Principal, Gauhati Medical College on 3 June 1961. Professor S.N. Sarma was the founder Principal of the Gauhati Medical College and he took great interest in the construction of the permanent college and hospital complexes. Paraclinical and clinical departments were started in the Civil Hospital Campus at Panbazar, Ulubari Maternity Home, Emigration Hospital (later on Infectious Diseases Hospital) and T.B. Hospital at Birubari, Guwahati as and when they became available. The members of the teaching staff were brought from Assam Medical College, Dibrugarh.

Due to non availability of a qualified person for professorship in SPM, the Medical Council of India permitted Dr. E. Lyngdoh, Professor of Medicine to be in-charge of the SPM department as its head. Later on Dr. A.C. Patowary took over as its head. Dr.G.C. Medhi took over as the Head of the Department of Forensic Medicine from the Civil Surgeon, Guwahati. Prof. I. Jahan was appointed as the Vice-Principal and Deputy Superintendent of the Gauhati Medical College and Hospital. Mr. Sarbananda Das was appointed as the Head Assistant of the college and Mr. Basanta Goswami became the Head Assistant of the hospital. When Mr. Sarbananda Das was left as secretary of the Silchar Medical College Mr. R. Nobis joined as secretary in GMC.

The government of Assam constructed the permanent buildings of the Gauhati Medical College and Hospital on the Narakachal hill. The P.W.D., government of Assam, took up the survey and started road constructions in 1962 in the Narakachal hill. The Assam Government Construction Corporation (AGCC) started building construction in February 1962. Hostels were given priority and started in the foothills of the Narakachal hill. The hostels were completed and taken over and occupied in between August 1965 and October 1966. The girls' hostel was occupied in June 1968.

B.P. Chaliha, the then Chief Minister of Assam, laid the foundation stone of the college building in the year 1963. The construction of the main college and administrative building at the Narakachal hill top could be started by the AGCC in April 1965 after the road was completed to the top by the PWD. Part by part the main college building was taken over from April 1968 to which Preclinical. Paraclinical and Central Library was shifted by August 1968. Meanwhile, the Silchar Medical College was inaugurated in its permanent building under construction at Ghungoor on 15 August 1968 and thereby the twin got separated. Dr. Rudra Goswami was put in charge of the Silchar Medical College. In September 1968 the permanent building of the Gauhati Medical College under process of construction was inaugurated by the Governor of Assam Mr. B.K. Nehru.

On 20 September 1968 the Chief Minister of Assam Mr. B.P. Chaliha laid the foundation stone of the hospital by the side of the college main building at Narakachal hill. However, the construction had to be abandoned because of the presence of large rocks. As stone breaking and clearing would incur massive expenditure the state government decided to shift the hospital construction to the foot hill of Narakachal. The foundation stone was laid down on 15 August 1975 by Shri Sarat Ch. Sinha, the Chief Minister of Assam. The new hospital at its permanent site at the Narakachal foot hill started functioning in 1984.

=== State Cancer Institute ===
On 17 February 2021, a new radiation oncology block was inaugurated by Assam's health minister Himanta Biswa Sarma. It is equipped with a ₹28 crore topotherapy machine, making the Gauhati Medical College and Hospital the first medical college in the country with such a facility.

== Courses ==
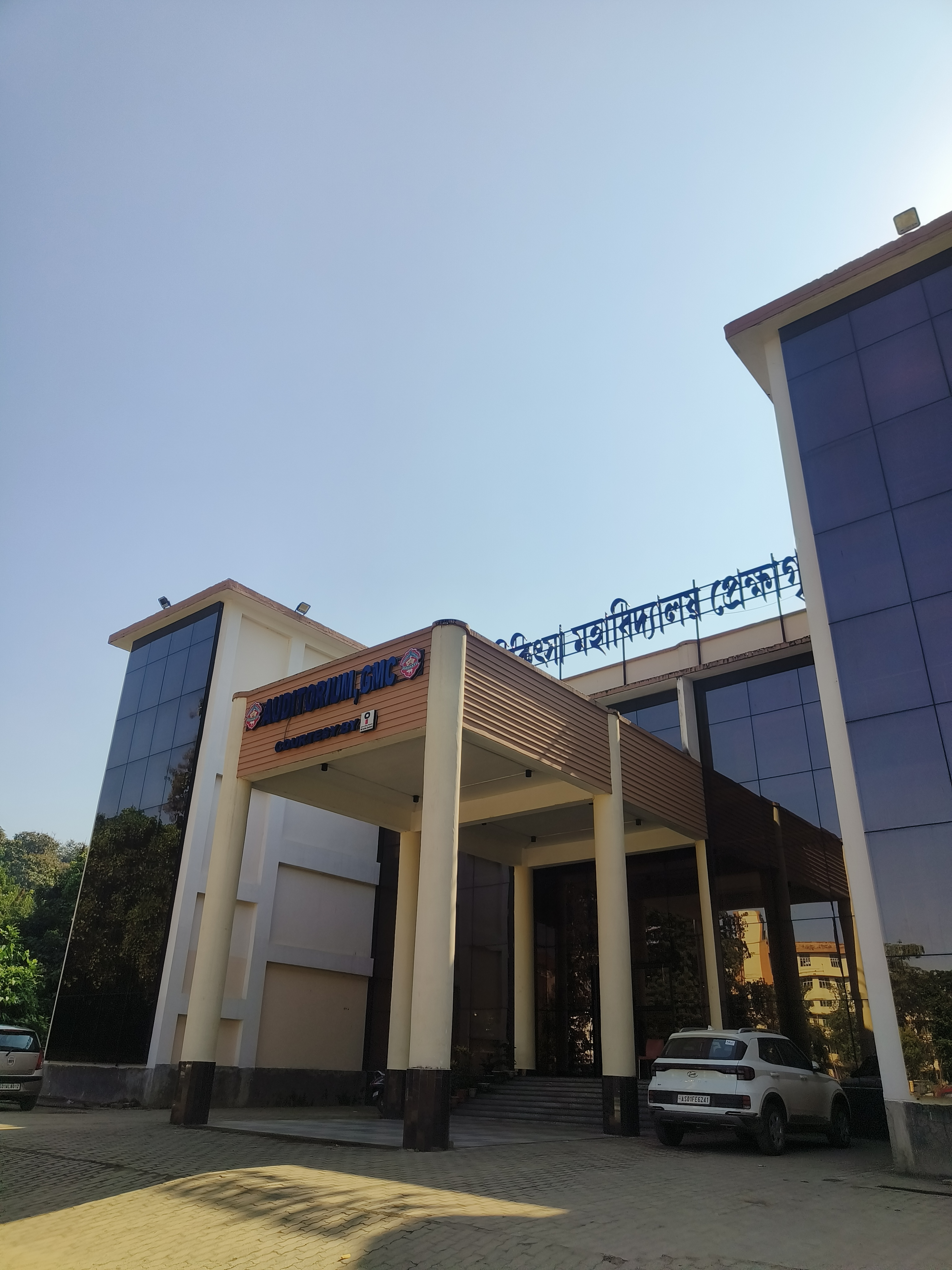
College Auditorium

The college offers a 5 1/2-year MBBS degree, which includes a one-year internship. It also offers both degree MD/MS (3-year) and Diploma (2-year) postgraduate medical courses. DM and Mch courses are also offered.

Degree	Duration	Seats Available
MBBS	5.5 years	200 seats
PG (MD/MS)	3 years	202 seats
DM/M.Ch	—	37 seats
Post Graduate Diploma Course Students	—	8 seats

=== Undergraduate courses ===
MBBS course at Gauhati Medical College and Hospital (GMCH) commenced in 1960 with an initial intake capacity of 100 students. The intake was subsequently increased to 136 in 1987 and further to 156 in 1992. Since 2019, the intake capacity stands at 200 students per year.

=== Postgraduate (MD/MS/Diploma) courses ===
GMCH started its Postgraduate (MD/MS/Diploma) courses in different departments as per the following timeline:

- 1966 – Anatomy, Physiology, Biochemistry, Obstetrics & Gynaecology
- 1969 – Pathology, Microbiology, Medicine
- 1971 – Pharmacology, Ophthalmology, Surgery, ENT
- 1973 – Psychiatry
- 1977 – Anaesthesiology, Paediatrics, Forensic Medicine
- 1988 – Community Medicine (SPM)
- 1989 – Orthopedics, Dermatology
- 1990 – Radiology
- 2013 – Pulmonary Medicine, Emergency Medicine
- 2021 – Radiation Oncology

As of now, GMCH offers 210 postgraduate seats across various disciplines.

=== Postdoctoral(DM/MCh) courses ===
The Postdoctoral (DM/MCh) courses at GMCH began in different departments as per the following years:

- 2005 – Urology
- 2008 – Cardiology, Endocrinology, Neurology, Neurosurgery, Plastic Surgery, Paediatric Surgery, Cardiothoracic & Vascular Surgery (CTVS)
- 2013 – Nephrology
- 2020 – Clinical Haematology, Medical Gastroenterology, Surgical Oncology

== Student activities ==
=== Junior Doctors' Association ===
The Junior Doctors' Association is the representative organization of the senior students along with the PG's, Interns and representatives from each Department & Batch. It consists of an Executive Body and a Working Committee consisting various members as well as representatives from the senior students. It is a major functioning body of the college and has its office in the GMCH Hospital Campus.

=== Students' Union ===
Gauhati Medical College Students Union is the representative body of the students. It was formed in 1961. Currently student politics is rather non existent in the college. The current student bodies are formed by selection and no democratic elections are held, But for the tenure 2017-18 Portfolios like President, Assistant General Secretary, Magazines Editor, Cultural Secretary, Major games Secretary, Minor games Secretary and Debating and literary Secretary were elected and For the portfolio of General Secretary, vice-president, Social service Secretary, Gymnasium Secretary were unanimously selected without involvement of any external parties.

=== Gamocha Painting ===
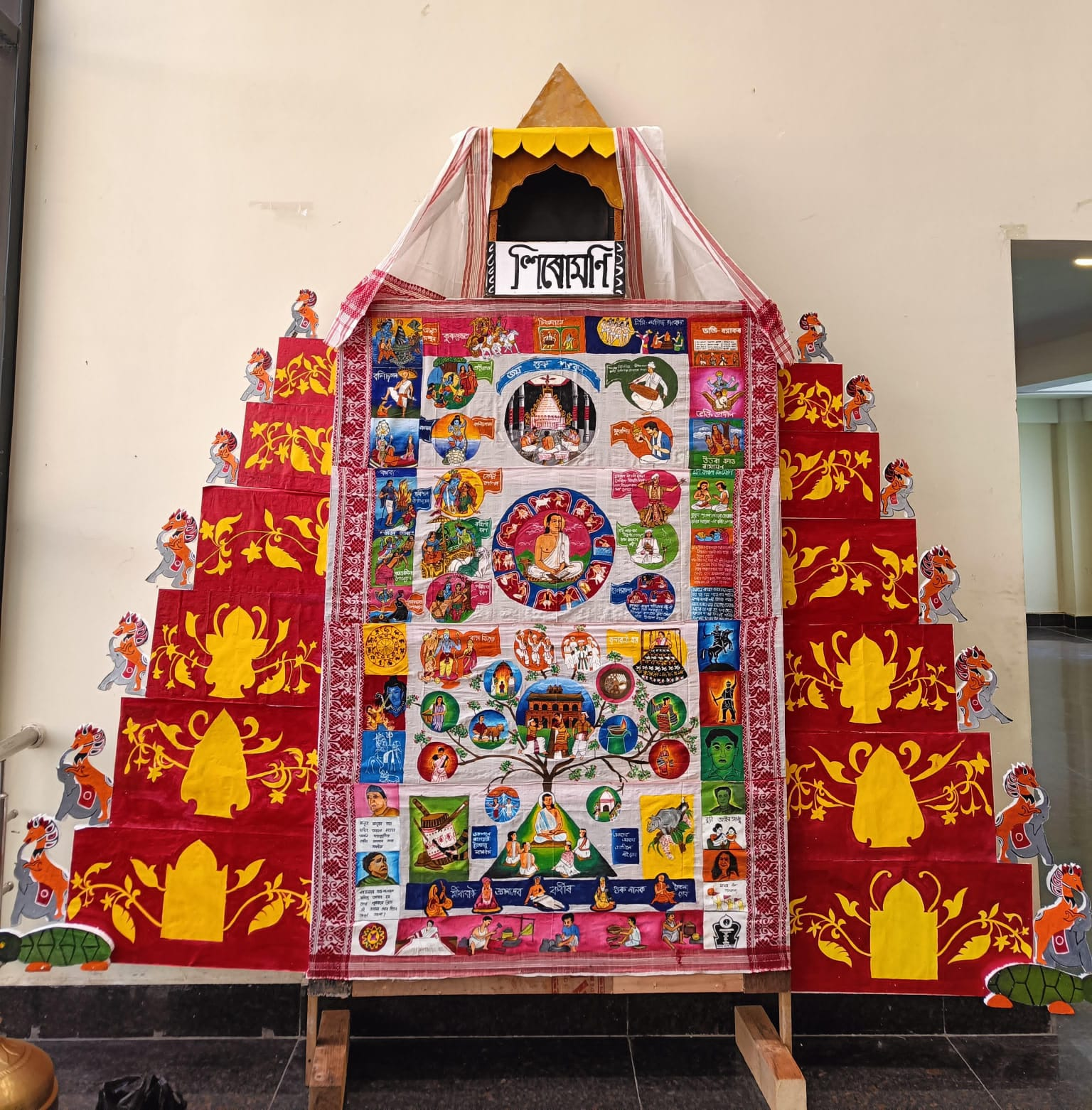
Gamocha Painting

Every year, a Gamocha Painting Competition is organized by Student Union among undergraduate students to commemorate the death anniversary of Srimanta Sankardeva. Students from boys' and girls' hostels, along with day boarders, participate in the event by presenting hand-painted Gamocha, a traditional Assamese cloth. The competition serves as a platform for students to showcase their artistic skills and cultural creativity. Based on their presentations, awards are given to encourage and inspire students to incorporate such artistic endeavors in the future.

=== Wall Magazine ===
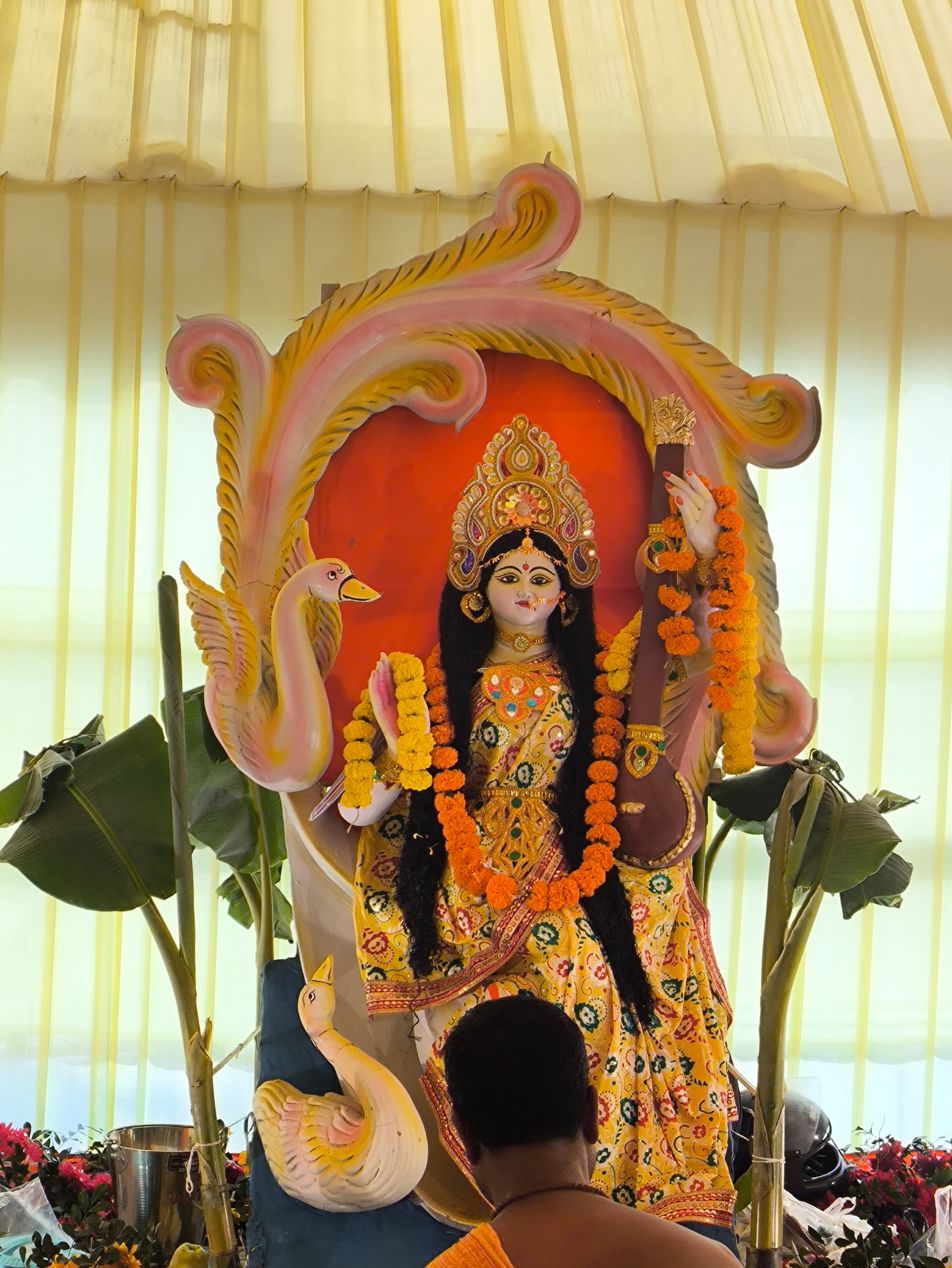
Saraswati Puja in 2025

On the occasion of Saraswati Puja, the Gauhati Medical College (GMC) Student Union organizes a Wall Magazine Competition among students. Participants contribute writings on specific topics, including articles, poems etc. The competition also emphasizes creative presentation and craftsmanship, that encourages students to express their literary and artistic talents.

== Notable alumni ==
- Ramesh C. Deka, former director, AIIMS New Delhi
- Dipika Deka, Gynaecologist and former Director of AIIMS Kalyani
- Nomal Chandra Borah, founder of GNRC Hospitals
- Motiur Rohman Mondal, Politician
- Ranoj Pegu, Minister in Assam Cabinet
- Numal Momin, Member of Legislative Assembly

== Achievements ==
Gauhati Medical College and Hospital successfully completed Cadaveric Kidney transplant on June 8, 2024 that benefitted two individuals undergoing hospitalization for Renal Failure. It took place at state of the art Super Specialty Wing, under the supervision of departments of Urology, Nephrology, Anaesthesiology and critical care.
