= Twelfth Five-Year Plan =

Twelfth Five-Year Plan may refer to:

- The Twelfth Five-Year Plan (People's Republic of China), began in 2011 and ended in 2015
- The Twelfth Five-Year Plan (Soviet Union), began in 1986 and ended in 1990
- The Twelfth Five Year Plan (India) began in 2012 and ended in 2017
