= Dipika Deka =

Indian Gynecologist at AIIMS, Delhi

Professor at AIIMS, Delhi
- In office May 1988 – May 2021

Vice-chancellor of Srimanta Sankaradeva University of Health Sciences
- In office April 2019 – Jan 2021
- Succeeded by: Dhruba Jyoti Borah

Founding Director at AIIMS, Kalyani
- In office 29 November 2018 – 08 March 2019
- Succeeded by: Gitanjali Batmanabane

Personal details
- Education: Gauhati Medical College and Hospital (MBBS 1977), (MD 1982)
- Profession: Professor; Gynecologist; Senior Consultant
- Known for: Maternal–fetal medicine
- Scientific career
- Fields: Obstetrics and gynaecology

Dipika Deka is an Indian physician, professor, and gynecologist. She is currently a Professor of Gynecology and Obstetrics at the All India Institute of Medical Sciences (AIIMS), New Delhi. She served at AIIMS Delhi from 1983 to 2018 and rejoined the institute on 1st February, 2021. She was appointed as the first Director of the All India Institute of Medical Sciences, Kalyani, West Bengal, which was established in 2019. On 11 April 2019, she was appointed as the Vice-Chancellor of Srimanta Sankardeva University of Health Sciences, Guwahati, Assam, and served in that position until 31 January, 2021. Deka is married to Dr. Ramesh Chandra Deka, a renowned ENT specialist and the first Assamese Director of the All India Institute of Medical Sciences, New Delhi.

== Education ==
Deka graduated from Guwahati Medical College in 1977. She secured first place in the MBBS examination in 1982 and was awarded the gold medal. Deka received her postgraduate degree from the same college and obtained her MD in 1982 in the Department of Gynecology and Obstetrics.

== Career ==
Deka joined the All India Institute of Medical Sciences (AIIMS), New Delhi in 1983 as a Senior Resident Physician in the Department of Gynecology and Obstetrics. She later served as the Head of the Maternal-Fetal Medicine Superspecialty at AIIMS Delhi. On 5 October 2018, she was appointed as the Director of the All India Institute of Medical Sciences, Kalyani, West Bengal. She was the founding Director of AIIMS Kalyani, which was officially established in 2019.

On 11 April 2019, Deka was appointed by the Governor of Assam as the Vice-Chancellor of the Srimanta Sankardeva University of Health Sciences, Guwahati. Deka is the first Assamese woman to serve as a Vice-Chancellor and also the first woman to hold the position at any university in Assam.
