= Nomal Chandra Borah =

Neurologist from Assam

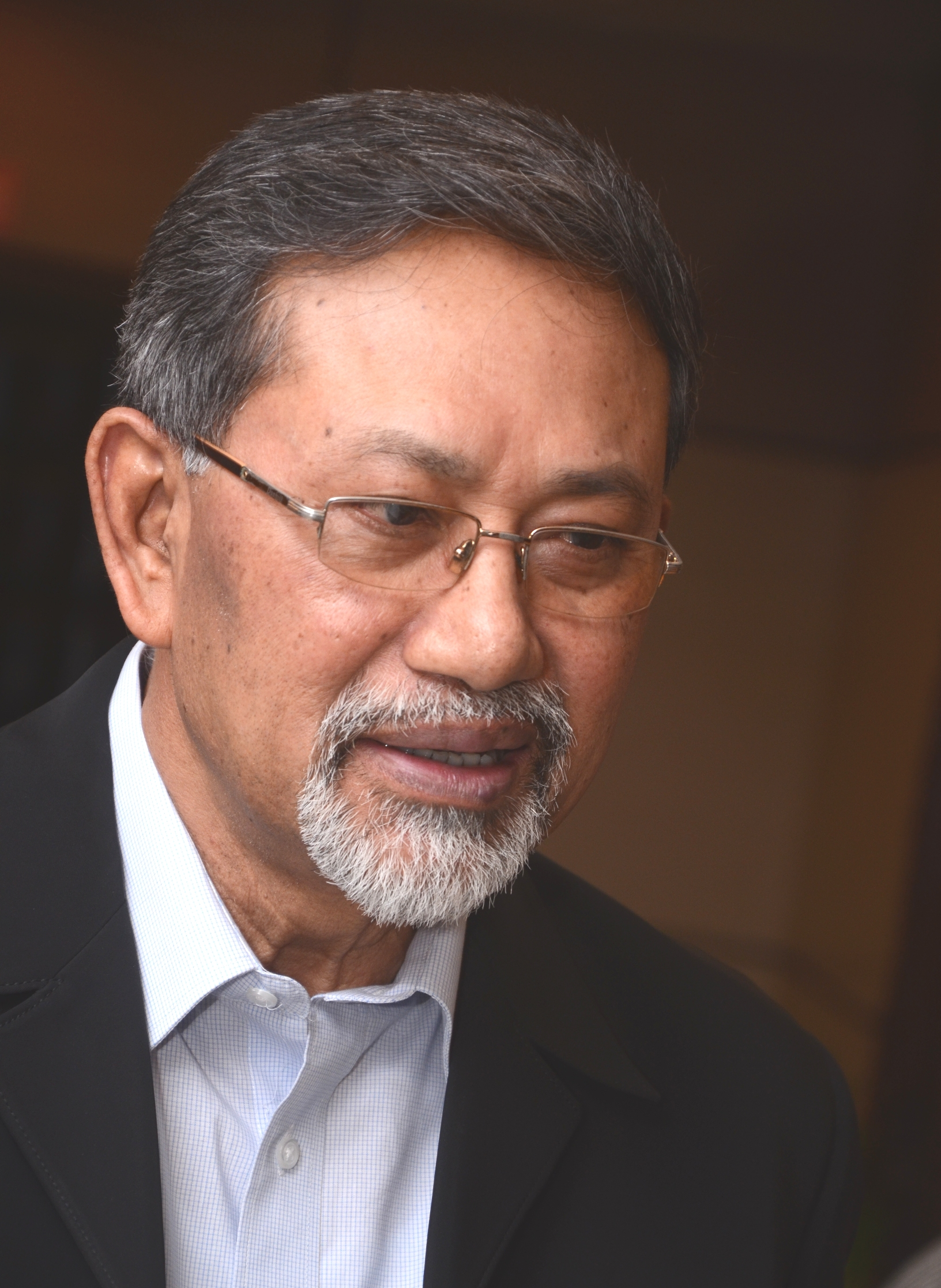
- Official portrait
- Born: 15 August 1950 (age 76); Dubia, Undivided Assam, India
- Education: Guwahati Medical College and Hospital (MBBS); AIIMS (DM); University of Michigan
- Occupations: Social Entrepreneur; Doctor
- Known for: GNRC Hospitals; Affordable Health Mission; Swasthyamitra; GNRC Medishop; Asian Institute of Nursing Education; GNRC Medireach
- Spouse: Dr. (Mrs.) Jayasree Borah
- Children: Ms. Priyanka Borah; Mrs. Satabdee Borah; Dr. Madhurjya Borah
- Awards: Fellow of the American Academy of Neurology (FAAN); Janamitra Award from Sanskritik Mahasabha, Asom, 2011; Lifetime Achievement Award by the Indian Academy of Neurology; Lifetime Achievement Award by The Association of Nurse Executive (India); Conferred with Lifetime Achievement Award 2026 by News18; Conferred with the degree of Doctor of Science (Honoris Causa) by Krishna Kanta Handiqui State Open University (KKHSOU); Conferred with Lifetime Achievement Award by the Chief Minister of Assam at the 110th Foundation Day celebration of Shree Marwari Databya Aushadhalaya (SMDA); Conferred with Manav Dorodi Award by Asam Sahitya Sabha on the occasion of National Doctors’ Day 2026

Nomal Chandra Borah is an Indian social entrepreneur and neurologist who founded GNRC Affordable Health Mission in India. He founded the GNRC Hospitals, the first Tertiary care Super-Specialty Hospital in North-east India. The hospital was initially set up in Maligaon, Guwahati with the name Guwahati Neurological Research Centre (GNRC) in the year 1984 with the active participation and supervision of Late Dr K V Mathai, the legendary Neurosurgeon from Vellore. Later, GNRC was converted into a limited company in the year 1985 and since then it has been involved in many pioneering healthcare delivery initiatives in North-east India. GNRC Ltd was officially formed in the year 1987.

Borah is the owner of the retail chain GNRC Medishop which provides hygienic FMCG products, grocery and personal care items and medicines. He also serves as a Managing Trustee of Asian Institute of Nursing Education.

== Early life ==
Dr Nomal Chandra Borah was born in a peasant family on 15 August 1950. His birthplace was Dubia village in Gohpur area of then undivided Sonitpur district of Undivided Assam.

== Medical education and career ==
Borah completed MBBS in the year 1975 from Gauhati Medical College and Hospital and joined the All India Institute of Medical Sciences (AIIMS), New Delhi as a Senior Resident, where he completed three years’ training in Neurology, leading to a DM degree.

In the year 1992, Borah attended the Graduate Summer Course in Epidemiology and Biostatistics from the University of Michigan, USA. He received Fellow of the American Academy of Neurology (FAAN).

== Foundation of GNRC ==
In the year 1984, Borah set up North-east India’s first Tertiary care super-specialty hospital in Guwahati, Assam, and coined it as Guwahati Neurological Research Centre. In the year 1985, it was converted to a limited company with the name GNRC Ltd.

GNRC was the first Tertiary care super-specialty hospital of Assam and North-east India.

In the year 2004, Borah founded Asian Institute of Nursing Education to create and nurture quality nursing professionals in the region. Currently, the institute offers degrees in B.Sc Nursing, Post Basic Nursing and M.Sc Nursing. Then in the year 2006, Borah started GNRC Medishop. These are retail stores combining FMCG, grocery, personal care and medicines.

The second facility under the aegis of GNRC Ltd was set up in the year 2008 at Sixmile, Guwahati.

== GNRC Affordable Health Mission and GNRC Medical ==
Borah initiated and launched a mobile medical unit named as GNRC Medireach in April 2012.

Borah personally visited more than 7,000 villages to understand the health issues faced by rural people and their inability to access and afford quality healthcare. This massive exercise led to the setting up of GNRC Medical at North Guwahati near Indian Institute of Technology, Guwahati (IITG) in the year 2014. It is an affordable healthcare institution catering to all cross-sections of the society, especially the financially weaker sections. This initiative was later recognized by World Bank Group (WBG) through its India Development Marketplace (IDM) initiative, to receive a grant of US $150,000.

In August 2017, Borah founded GNRC Affordable Health Mission to ensure access to affordable and quality healthcare for everyone in the society irrespective of their financial status. This Mission has already touched majority households of the state of Assam through a network of 12,000 GNRC Swasthya Mitras. GNRC Swasthya Mitras are essentially community health workers for the Mission.

== As a Writer ==
- Publishing "GNRC Swasthya" a Health Magazine since 2007 with a monthly circulation of 65,000 copies.
- "Chikitsokor Tokabohi:, a book in Assamese language published by Prapti Prakash in 2006.
- "Sarukonor Stroke Aru Sikisthya Bishoyok Ananya Rosona", a book in Assamese language. Published by Student’s Corner, June 2012
- "Doctor Aru Rogir Jugalbandi," a book in Assamese language, published by Students Corner, 28 November 2014.
- "Swasthya Sikitshya Bigyan Aru Somaj Bybostha", a book in Assamese language, published by GNRC Swasthya, November, 2017.

== Awards and achievements ==
- Recognition from Indira Gandhi National Open University (IGNOU) by including the Profile of Dr. N. C. Borah as a case study in the Chapter on "Rural Entrepreneurship—Strategies And Experiences " for M.Sc Course in Social Sciences, 2007.
- Conferred the "ERDF Excellence Award, 2015" for the entrepreneurial initiative to provide quality healthcare and contributions towards the development of Neurosciences in North Eastern India.
- Honoured with Lifetime Achievement Award by the Indian Academy of Neurology (IAN).
- Conferred with Lifetime Achievement Award by the Association of Nurse Executive (India).
- Conferred with Lifetime Achievement Award 2026 by News18.
- Conferred with the degree of Doctor of Science (Honoris Causa) by Krishna Kanta Handiqui State Open University (KKHSOU).
- Conferred with Lifetime Achievement Award by the Chief Minister of Assam at the 110th Foundation Day celebration of Shree Marwari Databya Aushadhalaya (SMDA).
- Conferred with Manav Dorodi Award by Asam Sahitya Sabha on the occasion of National Doctors’ Day 2026.
