= All India Institute of Medical Sciences, Kalyani =

Medical school in West Bengal, India

- Motto: svāsthyaṃ sarvārthasādhanam
- Motto in English: Health is the greatest wealth
- Type: Public medical school
- Established: September 4, 2019; 7 years ago
- Accreditation: INI
- Budget: ₹213.87 crore (US$22.8 million) (2024–25)
- President: Dr. Yogendra Kumar Gupta
- Director: Dr. Arvind Sinha
- Faculty: 194
- Students: 700 (2025)
- Undergraduates: 623 (2025)
- Postgraduates: 75 (2025)
- Doctoral students: 02 (2025)
- Location: Kalyani, West Bengal, India; 22°58′26.77″N 88°28′2.09″E
- Campus: Midsize city 179.82 acres (72.77 ha)
- Language: English
- Website: aiimskalyani.edu.in

All India Institute of Medical Sciences Kalyani (abbr. AIIMS Kalyani) (Bengali pronunciation: [ɔkʰil bʱarot̪ijɔ t͡ʃikit̪sa bigːæn prot̪iʂʈʰan kolːani]) is a public hospital and medical school in Saguna, Kalyani, West Bengal, India. It is one of the AIIMS and Institutes of National Importance.

Announced in 2014 and formally approved on October 7, 2015, the institute broke ground in 2016. It was established by the Government of India under the Pradhan Mantri Swasthya Suraksha Yojana (PMSSY) initiative, as formalized by a Ministry of Health and Family Welfare notification in The Gazette of India on January 24, 2018. AIIMS Kalyani commenced operations in 2019, standing as one of six AIIMS institutions to gain functional autonomy that year.

The institution features a comprehensive medical complex comprising a 960-bed Super Specialty hospital and a dedicated medical college. Within this infrastructure, the AYUSH division accounts for 920 beds, while the remaining 40 beds are situated within the OPD. The Super Specialty hospital is home to 34 specialized departments, ranging from clinical and diagnostic fields such as Anesthesiology and Biochemistry to foundational disciplines like Anatomy, Cardiology, and Physiology.

It is an undergraduate and postgraduate institution that enrolls 211 students yearly. The yearly MBBS intake is 125 from 2020 and selection is done through NEET(UG). There is also a B.Sc. and M.Sc. Nursing College.

== History ==
=== Proposal: 1957–2014 ===
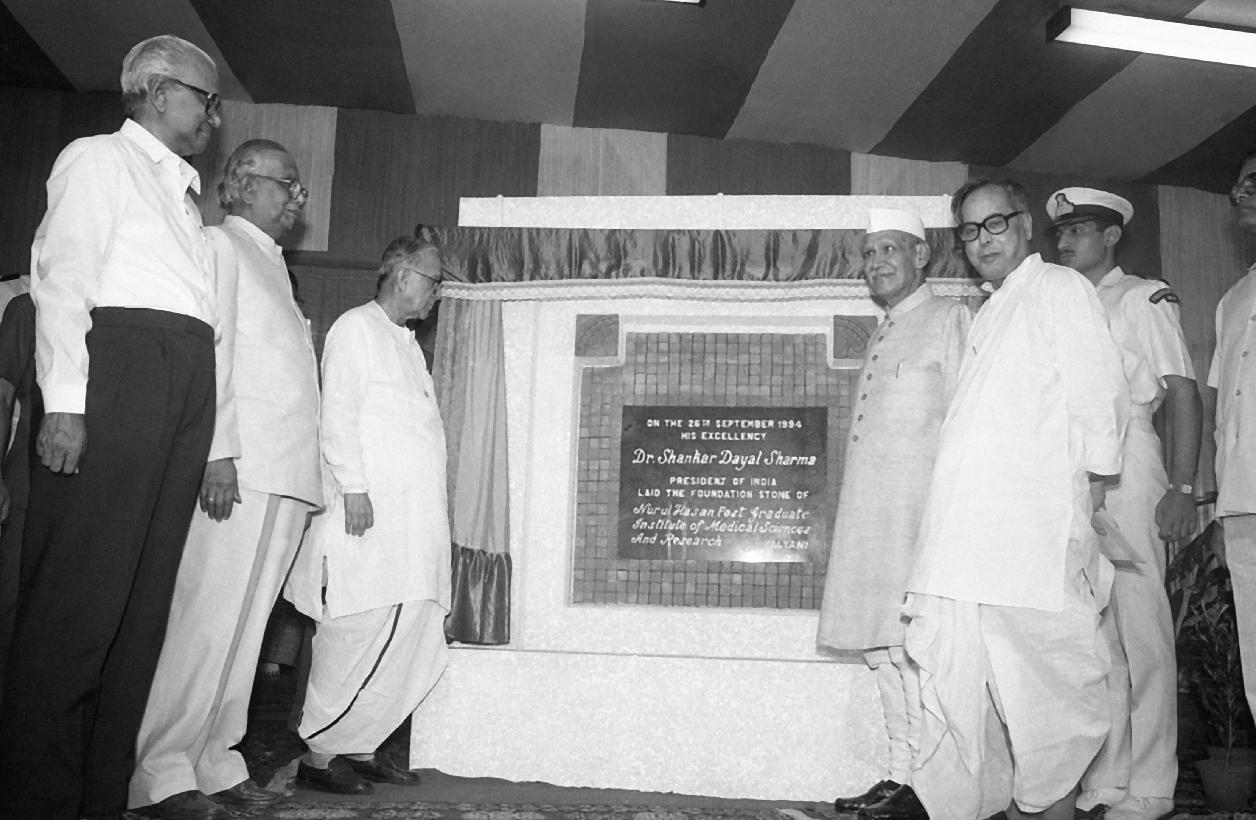
On September 26, 1994, President Shankar Dayal Sharma officially laid the foundation stone for PGIMER, Kalyani, by unveiling a commemorative plaque.

In 1957, Prime Minister of India Jawaharlal Nehru had offered to turn SSKM Hospital into an "AIIMS-type" institute. But the then chief minister, Bidhan Chandra Roy, had turned down the offer.

The historical discourse surrounding the establishment of an AIIMS-caliber institution in West Bengal dates back to 1994. Following extensive deliberations with the Central Government, the then Health Minister of the Left Front administration, Prasanta Sur, announced the preliminary decision to establish an AIIMS-equivalent hospital in Kalyani. To catalyze this initiative, Pranab Mukherjee, who served as the Chairman of the Planning Commission at the time, authorized an initial allocation of ₹10 crore. On September 26, 1994, the project reached a significant milestone when President Shankar Dayal Sharma presided over the groundbreaking ceremony for the Nurul Hasan Post-Graduate Institute of Medical Science and Research at the designated site. During the proceedings, it was formally underscored that the facility was envisioned to function as a premier medical center modeled strictly after the All India Institute of Medical Sciences.

A pivotal moment in Indian medical history occurred in 2003 when Union Health Minister Sushma Swaraj approved a proposal to modernize the Calcutta Medical College and Hospital. By granting it a status equivalent to Delhi’s AIIMS, the government aimed to revitalize an institution that holds the distinction of being the first of its kind in Asia.

Establishing AIIMS, was part of the Pradhan Mantri Swasthya Suraksha Yojana (PMSSY) initiative, announced by the Government of India and officially launched in March 2006, for the purpose of "correcting regional imbalances in the availability of affordable/reliable tertiary healthcare services", through setting up AIIMS Delhi-like institutions and upgrading government medical colleges.

Union Cabinet approved the establishment of an AIIMS-like institution in West Bengal on February 5, 2009. To facilitate this project, the West Bengal State Government has committed to providing 100 acres of land in Raiganj, located in the Uttar Dinajpur District. This initiative aimed to significantly enhance regional medical infrastructure and specialized patient care.

Establishing an AIIMS in West Bengal was proposed in 2012 as part of the 12th Five-Year Plan, with the original location proposed being Raiganj, 190 kilometres (120 mi) from the capital Kolkata, However, due to various challenges, including land acquisition issues and political opposition, the location was changed to Kalyani by June 2014, It was only 50 kilometres (31 mi) from the capital.

=== PMSSY: Phase IV ===
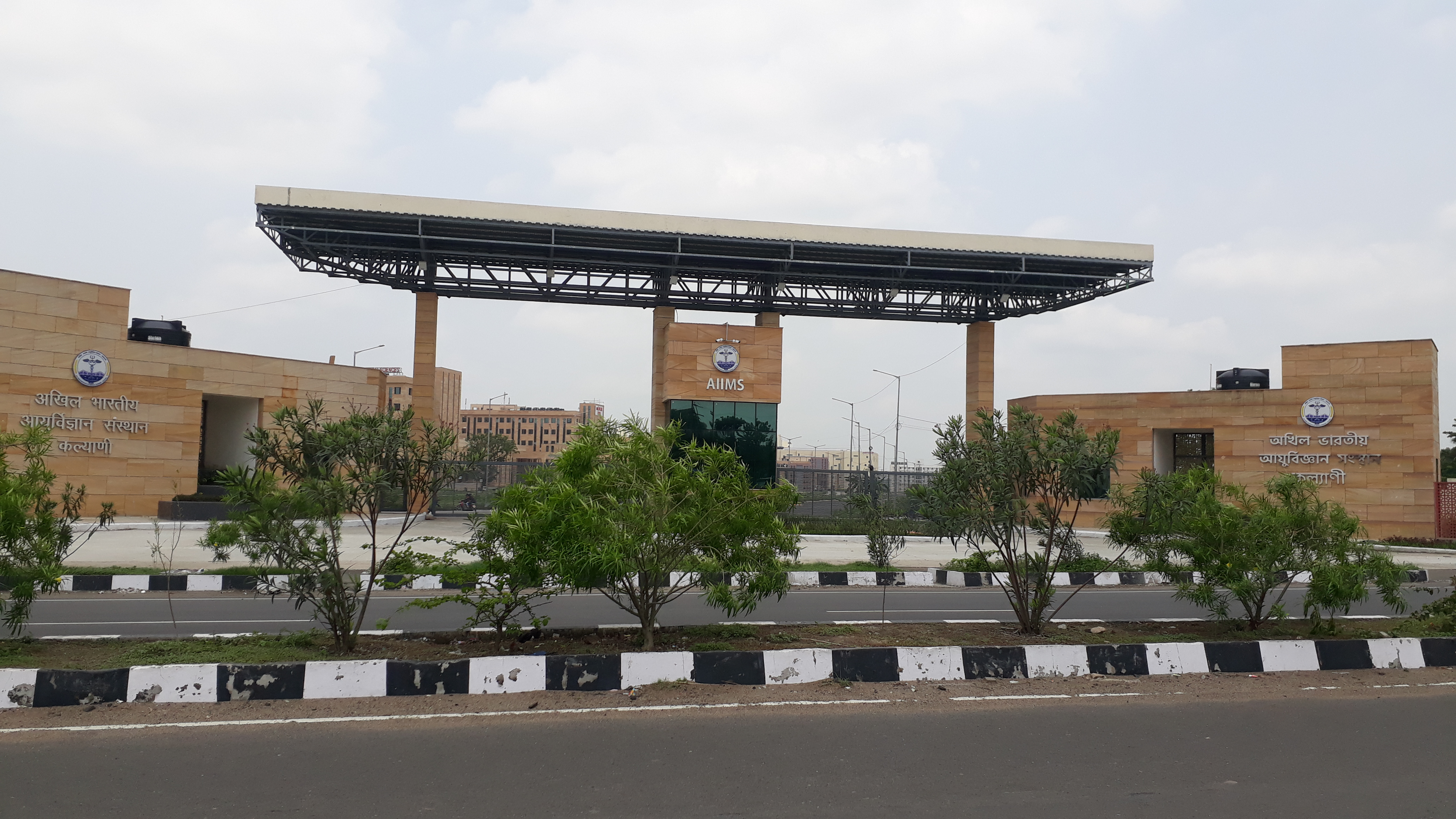
Main entrance of AIIMS Kalyani

The establishment of AIIMS was officially formalised in July 2014, During the 2014–15 budget speech, then-Finance Minister Arun Jaitley earmarked ₹500 crore (equivalent to ₹872 crore or US$93 million in 2026) for the establishment of four "Phase-IV" AIIMS institutions. West Bengal was selected for these facilities, while the remaining slots were simply allocated to three other regional territories. In March 2015, the union cabinet gave an official approval for the location, on a 150-acre lot in the village Basantapur, near Kalyani. In October 2015, an official budget of ₹1,754 crore (US$190 million) was sanctioned The West Bengal government completed the handover of the 179.82-acre land plot to the central government in December of that year.

=== Genesis ===
Construction of the institute’s campus commenced in 2016. Established by the Union Government on 24 January 2018, the Institute was founded under the authority granted by Section 3, Sub-section (1) of the All India Institute of Medical Sciences Act, 1956 (25 of 1956), following a formal notification by the Ministry of Health and Family Welfare. AIIMS Bhubaneswar served as the mentoring institution, Dipika Deka was appointed as the inaugural director. and Chitra Sarkar was appointed to the position of president. Deka resigned in March 2019, leaving the directorship vacant. In March 2020, Ramji Singh was designated as the new Executive Director. From September 2025 onwards, Arvind Sinha (Head, Pediatric Surgery – AIIMS Jodhpur) has been appointed as the Director of AIIMS Kalyani.

=== Developments ===
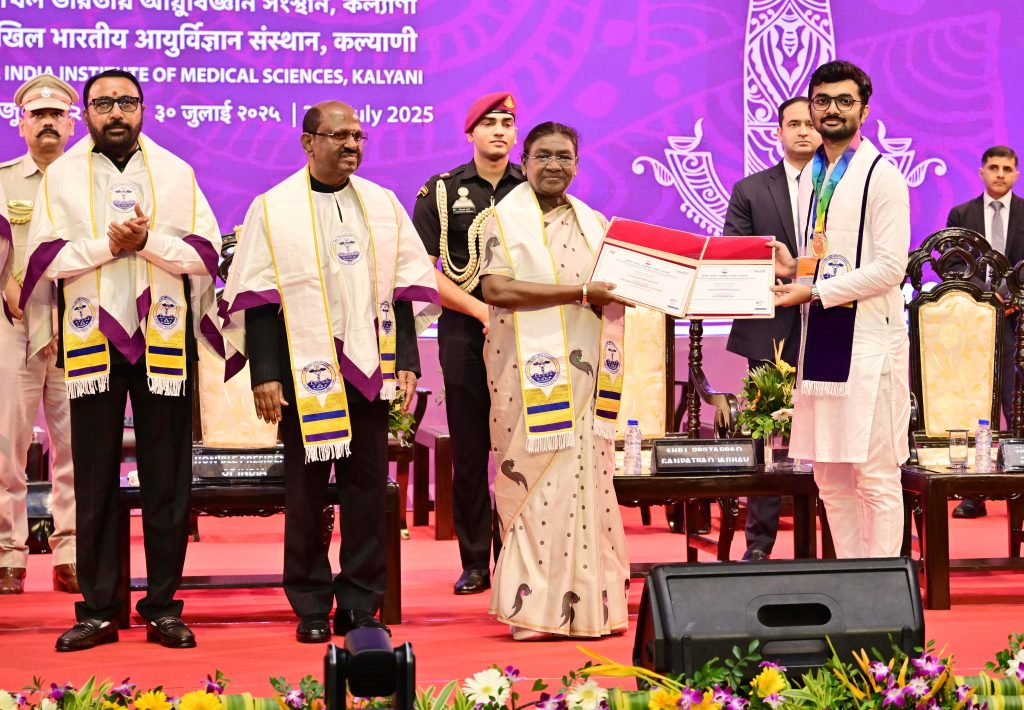
President Droupadi Murmu and Union Health Minister Prataprao Jadhav graced the inaugural convocation ceremony of AIIMS, Kalyani on July 30, 2025.

The institute became operational with the first batch of 50 MBBS students, which one of the six AIIMS to become operational in 2019. Classes started in September 2019. Temporarily, classes of the first batch were taken at the College of Medicine & JNM Hospital campus in Kalyani, while students were already staying at the hostel on the campus. In 2020, the number of MBBS seats was increased from 50 to 125.

On 1 March 2022, first Academic season of B.Sc (Nursing) course with 60 number of seats capacity inaugurated by institute president. In November 2022, Institute has been permitted to run postgraduate courses with 26 number of seats allocated for INI-CET January 2023 session. M.Sc (Nursing) on Pediatrics Nursing and Psychiatric Nursing with 4 NOS seat started for August 2023 session.

July 30, 2025, marked a definitive milestone in the institution's ascent as a premier center of national importance. The occasion was its inaugural convocation ceremony, graced by the President of India, Smt. Droupadi Murmu. The event celebrated the academic completion of the institute’s pioneering MBBS batch—admitted in 2019—alongside several Post-Doctoral Certificate Course (PDCC) scholars, signaling the institute's successful transition from a nascent project to a fully realized pillar of the Indian healthcare system.

== Logo ==
The institution's seal features prominent structures, agricultural crops, places, and rivers of Bengal. The name of the institution appears in Sanskrit above the seal and in English below it, flanked by two rice sheaves on each side—symbolizing paddy, Bengal's primary crop. A book follows the Rod of Asclepius, representing the institution's role in medical education. The blue waters at the bottom depict the Hooghly River, with the bridge above them illustrating the Howrah Bridge (Rabindra Setu). The root-like elements beneath the Rod of Asclepius evoke the mangrove forests of the Sundarbans, formed by the Gangetic Delta, Brahmaputra, and Meghna Rivers—a UNESCO World Heritage Site rich in flora and fauna. The Bengal tiger embodies regional pride and serves as India's national animal. The two fish signify the abundance of fish in Bengal's rivers and their importance as a food source. The seal's design was conceived by Madhavan C, an assistant professor of physiology.

== Campuses ==
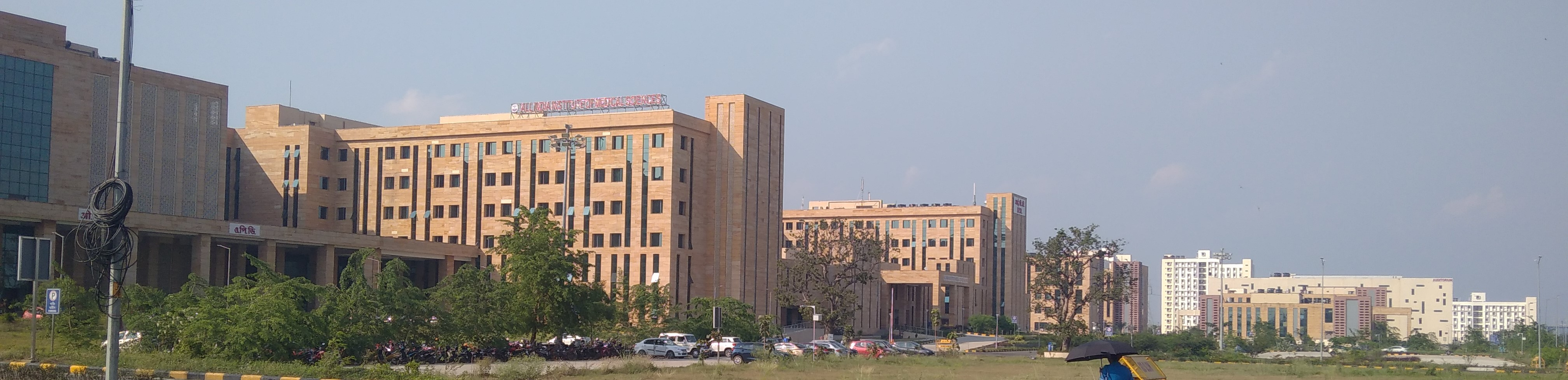
The campus of All India Institute of Medical Sciences, Kalyani.

AIIMS Kalyani's 179.82 acres (0.7277 km^{2}) campus is in Saguna, Kalyani, West Bengal, an affluent suburban residential community 50 kilometres (31 mi) north of downtown Kolkata. It is directly north of the NH 34 Connector (the road connects Kalyani with NH 34), directly west of the Jamuna river and about 12 km east of Hooghly river. The campus is located in Seismic Zone III.

The campus is logically organized into three distinct zones: the Institutional, Residential, and Service areas. While the layout generally places the Institutional facilities to the south and the Residential quarters to the north, the Dharamshala block serves as a notable exception, being a residential unit situated within the southern sector. In terms of density, the campus features 10 buildings dedicated to institutional use and 16 allocated for residential purposes. Supporting these zones is the Service area—which includes critical infrastructure like electrical substations—positioned primarily along the western boundary wall.

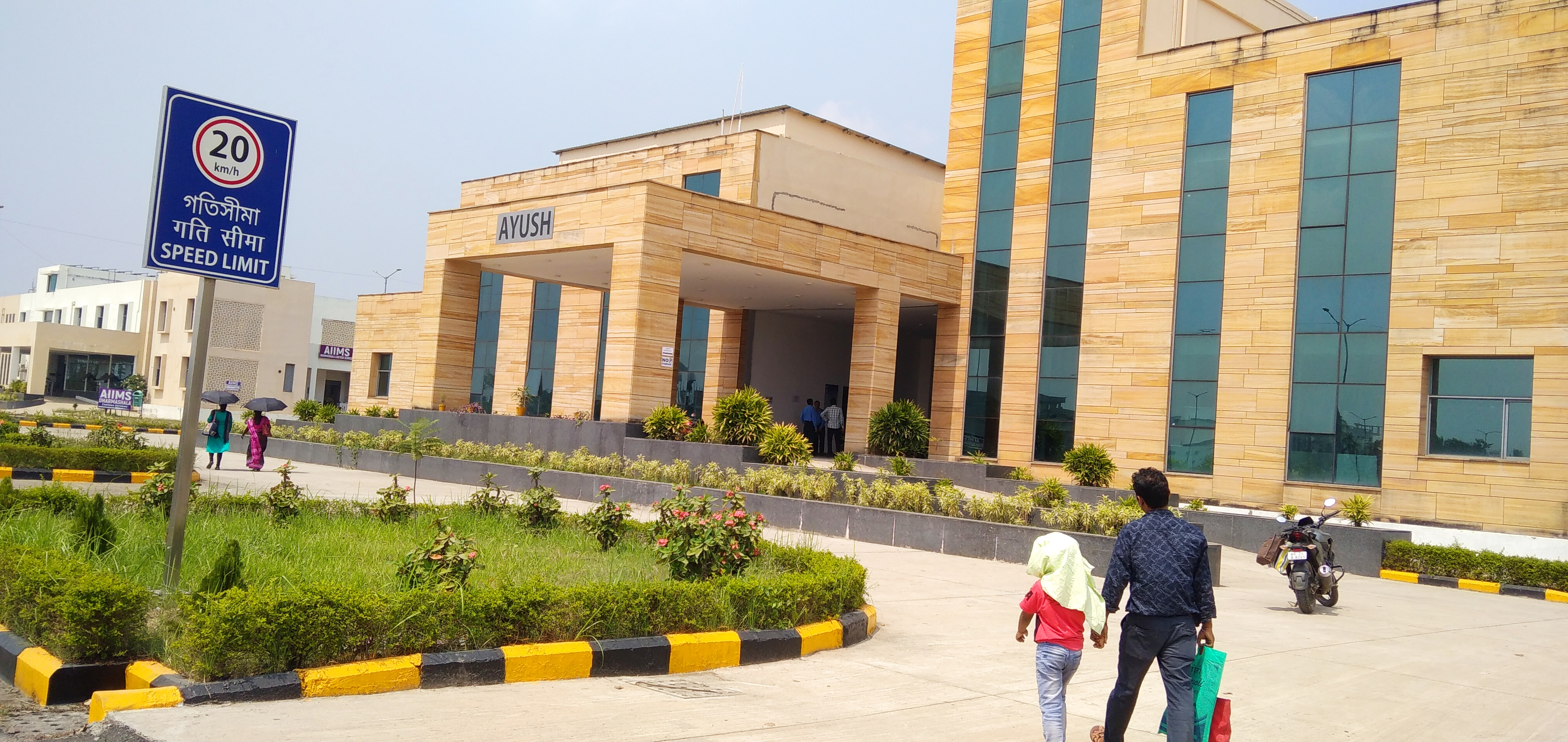
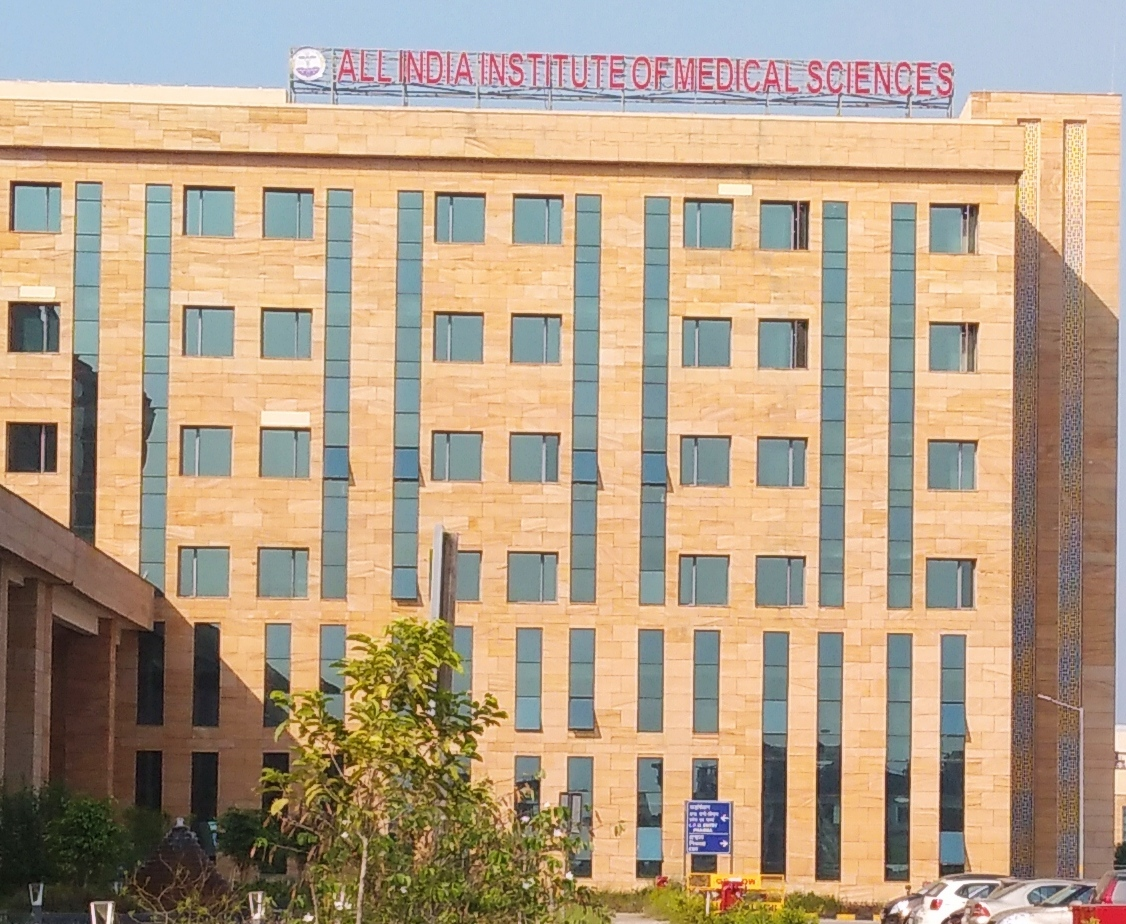
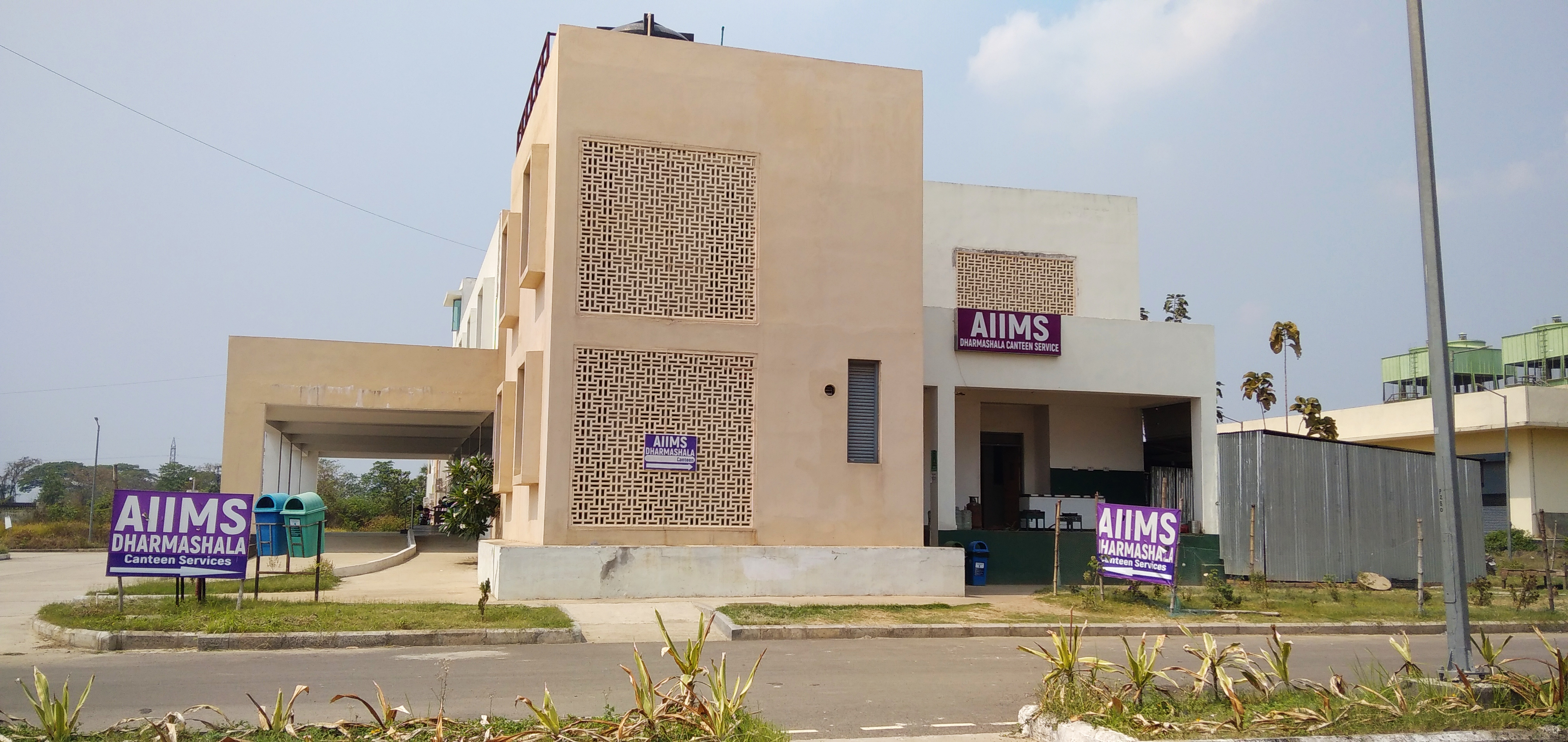
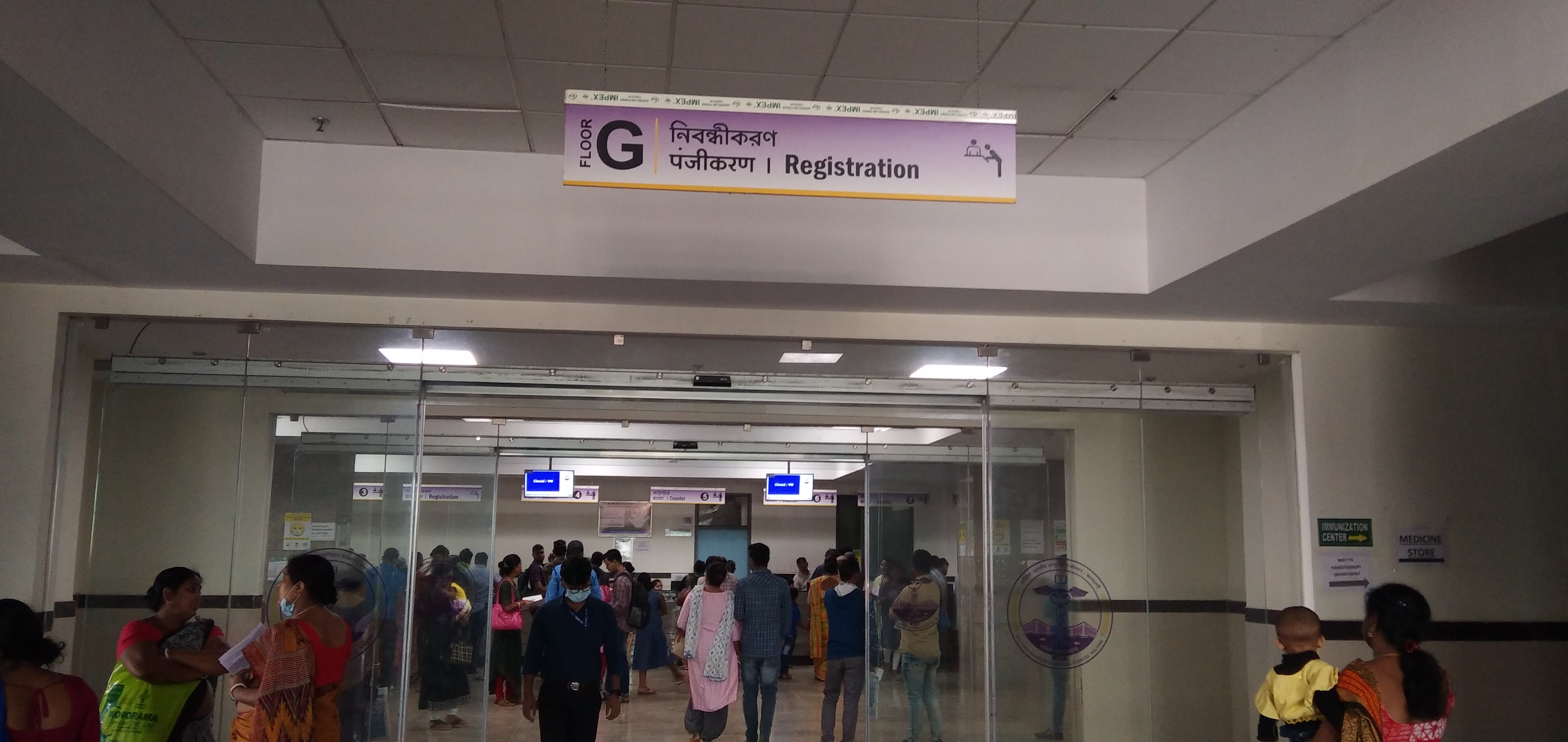
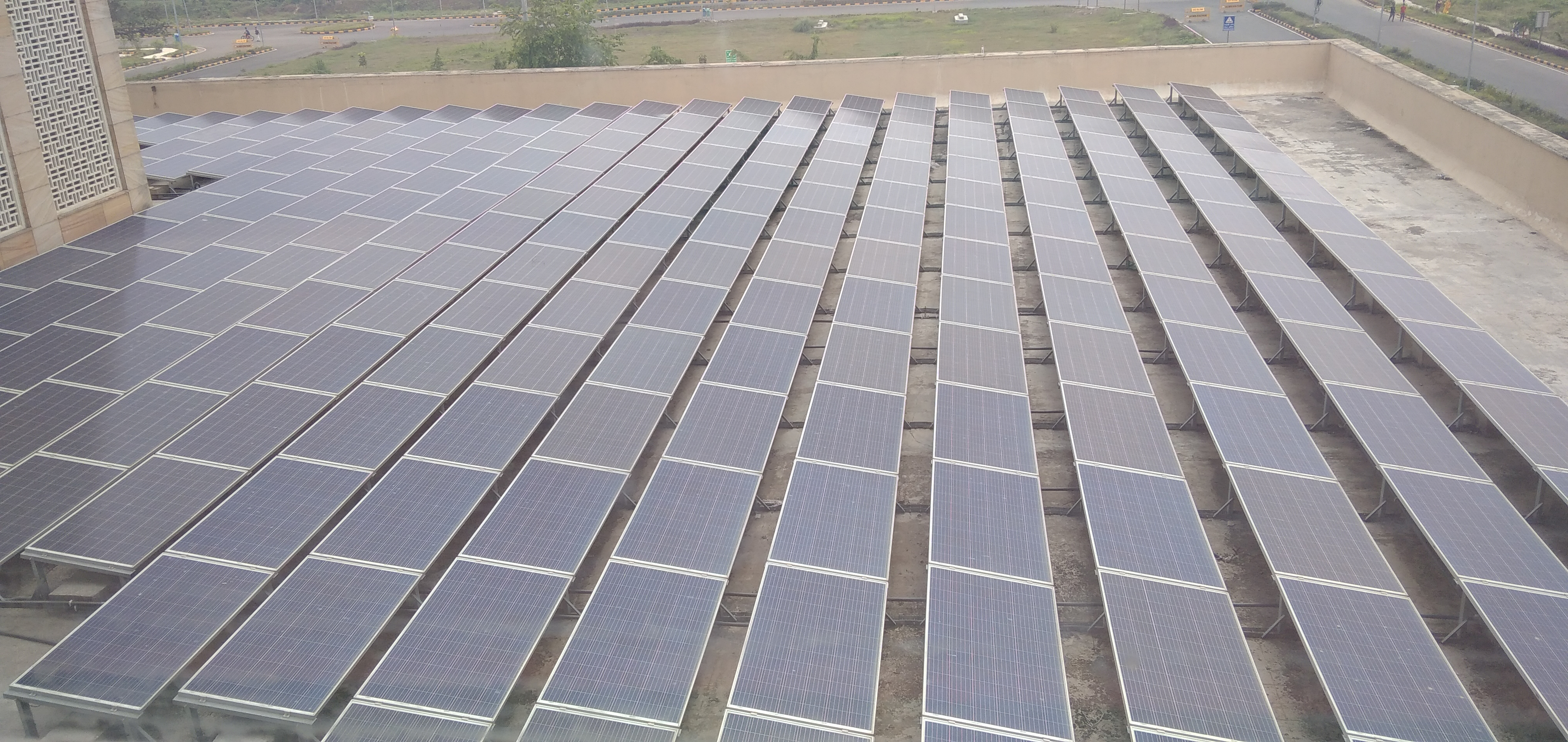
From top left to bottom right (a) AYUSH block at AIIMS Kalyani; (b) Inpatient Department building; (c) Dharamshala (canteen); (d) Patient name registration room; (e) Solar panels on Outpatient Department (OPD) building's roof.

The campus consists of mostly housing and academic buildings for the MBBS students, B.Sc (Nursing) students, and staff. Infrastructure (buildings and roads etc.) covers a total area of 57650.21 square meters, which is about 7.92% of the total campus's area. The hospital block is at the southern end of the campus, which is located near the main entrance to the campus. It covers a total area of 22,574.16 square meters. Ayush Block (Ayurveda and Homeopathy) is directly west of the Outpatient department (OPD) building, and only liquid oxygen plant of the institution is located to the west of the Inpatient department (IPD) building. There is only one canteen named "Dharamshala" within the campus, which is located west of Ayush Block.

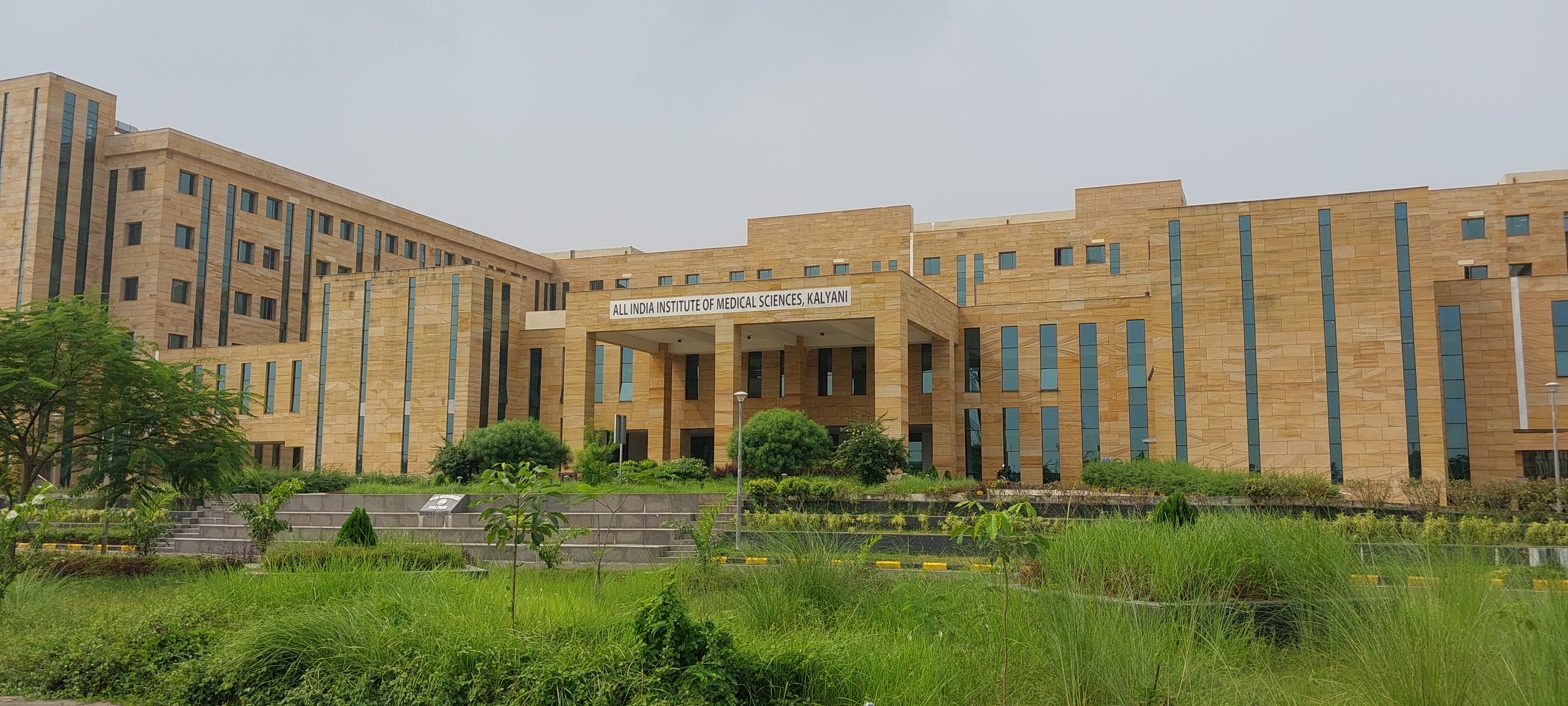
Inpatient department (IPD) building of AIIMS, Kalyani

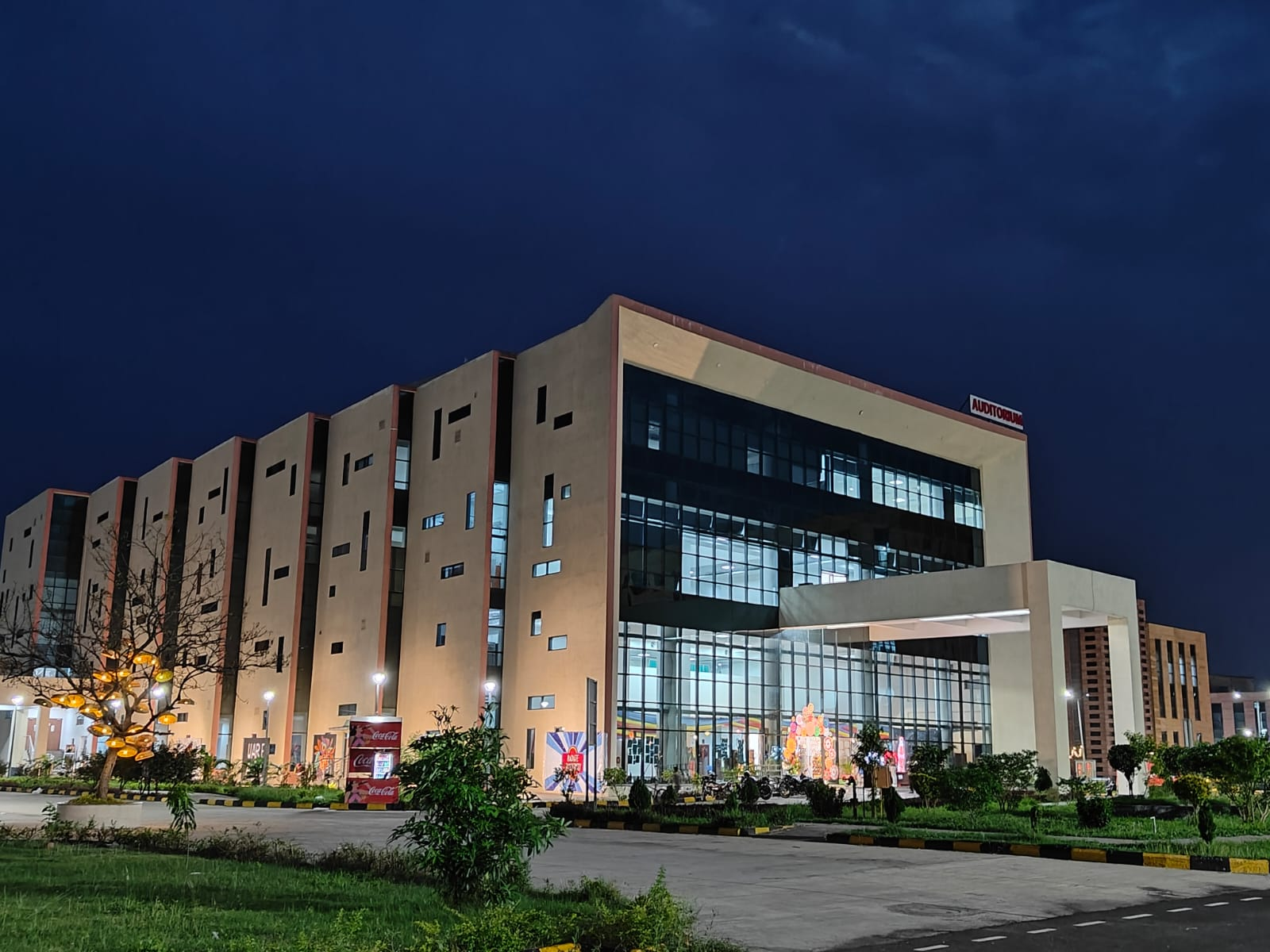
Auditorium of the All India Institute of Medical Sciences, Kalyani.

Seven hostel buildings are located north of the parking lot (for AIIMS staff) and auditorium. The hostel buildings can accommodate a total of 1397 students. The complex of medical college building, nursing college building and laboratory building (medical) is to the north of the hospital building and to the west of the institution's administrative building. There are 5 residential buildings for staff, one guest house and an executive director's residence in the northern part of the campus. Granite, marble and vitrified tiles have been used for flooring in the buildings.

The parking area within the campus has a total area of 68,981 square meters, which can accommodate about 2999 cars. Parking spaces are provided at suitable locations near the activity area.

== Organization and administration ==
=== Governance ===
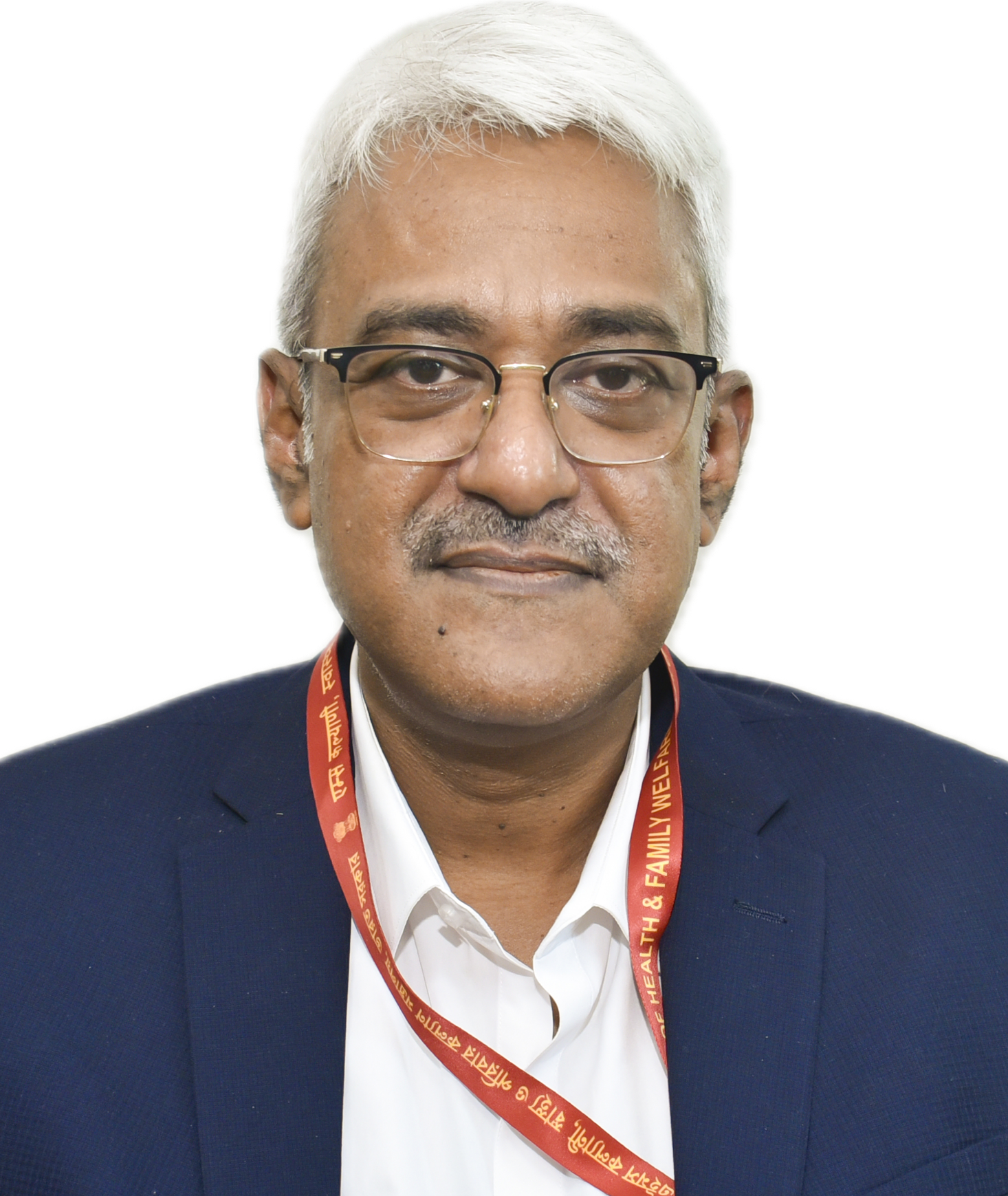
Prof. (Dr.) Arvind Sinha, Executive Director, All India Institute of Medical Sciences, Kalyani

The institute is governed by a board of administrative officers or governing body, which includes president and director of the institute, chief secretary of the Government of West Bengal, the vice-chancellor of the University of Calcutta, director of IIT Kharagpur, secretary of Ministry of Health and Family Welfare, and 5 others. They monitor the operation of the institute and its funding. There are three committees are within the governing body: Standing Academic Committee, Standing Selection Committee and Standing Finance Committee. In November 2018, Chitra Sarkar became the 1st president of the institute. In August 2025, Prof (Dr) YK Gupta joined the institute as the current president of the Institute. He is the former head of department of Pharmacology and former Dean Academics of All India Institute of Medical Sciences, Delhi. The Institute is currently headed by Executive Director and CEO, Prof. (Dr) Arvind Sinha from 22nd Sept 2025. He is a notable Pediatric Surgeon and was previously the Medical Superintendent of All India Institute of Medical Sciences, Jodhpur, and was the Head of the Department of Pediatric Surgery before joining on deputation. The institute is funded by the Government of India.

=== Departments and centers ===
- Anatomy
- Anaesthesiology
- Biochemistry
- Biostatistics
- Burn & Plastic surgery
- Cardiology
- Cardiothoracic and Vascular surgery
- Community medicine & Family medicine
- Dentistry
- Dermatology & Venereology
- Endocrinology and Metabolism
- ENT
- Forensic Medicine & Toxicology
- Gastroenterology
- General Medicine
- General Surgery
- Medical oncology
- Microbiology
- Nephrology
- Neurosurgery
- Nutrition & Dietetics
- Nuclear medicine
- Nursing
- Obstetrics & Gynaecology
- Ophthalmology
- Orthopaedics
- Paediatric Surgery
- Pathology / Laboratory Medicine
- Pediatrics
- Pharmacology
- Physical medicine and rehabilitation
- Physiology
- Psychiatry
- Pulmonary medicine
- Radio-Diagnosis
- Radiation Oncology / Radiotherapy
- Rheumatology & Clinical immunology
- Surgical Gastroenterology
- Transfusion medicine & Blood bank
- Trauma & Emergency medicine
- Urology

== Academics ==
=== Admission ===
For MBBS courses, admission is based on the National Eligibility cum Entrance Test (NEET–UG) rankings. Meanwhile, for postgraduate courses (MD, MS and MDS), one has to take the Institute of National Importance–Common Entrance Test (INI-CET) conducted by AIIMS Delhi every 6 months. A merit list is prepared on the basis of the examination results, on the basis of which list the students are admitted. A candidate must have MBBS degree to get admission in MD or MS course. The institution admits medical students as well as nursing students. For B.Sc. and M.Sc. nursing course, students need to clear the AIIMS Nursing Entrance Test. Admission is done on the basis of students' rank in merit list.

=== Academic programs ===
==== Doctor of Philosophy ====
- Ph.D. in Biochemistry
- Ph.D. in Cardiology
- Ph.D. in Community medicine & Family medicine
- Ph.D. in E.N.T
- Ph.D. in Microbiology
- Ph.D. in Ophthalmology
- Ph.D. in Pediatrics
- Ph.D. in Pathology
- Ph.D. in Pharmacology
- Ph.D. in Physiology
- Ph.D. in Psychiatry
- Ph.D. in Nursing
- Ph.D. in Dentistry

==== Super Speciality Medicine Courses ====
- DM in Cardiology
- DM in Pulmonary Medicine & Critical Care
- DM in Endocrinology & Metabolism
- DM in Medical Oncology
- DM in Gastroentrrology
- M.Ch. in Burns & Plastic Surgery
- M.Ch. in Neurosurgery
- M.Ch. in Urology

=== Postgraduate courses ===
- MD in Anatomy
- MD in Physiology
- MD in Biochemistry
- MD in Pathology
- MD in Forensic Medicine & Toxicology
- MS in Obstetrics & Gynaecology
- MD in Psychiatry
- MD in Dermatology
- MS in General Surgery
- MS in Otorhinolaryngology (E.N.T)
- MD in Pediatrics
- MD in Community Medicine & Family Medicine
- MD in Microbiology
- MD in General Medicine
- MD in Pharmacology
- MS in Ophthalmology
- MS in Orthopedics
- MD in Anesthesiology
- MD in Transfusion Medicine
- MD in Physical Medicine & Rehabilitation (P.M.R.)
- M.Sc. in Pediatric Nursing
- M.Sc. in Psychiatric Nursing
- M.Sc. in Medical Anatomy
- M.Sc. in Medical Physiology
- M.Sc. in Medical Biochemistry
- MDS in Conservative Dentistry and Endodontics
- MDS in Orthodontics and Dentofacial Orthopedics

=== Post-Doctoral Certificate Courses ===
- Neuroanaesthesia
- Glaucoma
- Pediatric Allergy
- Molecular and Biochemical Genetics
- Head and Neck Surgery
- Addiction Psychiatry
- Child and Adolescent Psychiatry
- Vitreo Retina
- Joint Replacement & Reconstruction
- Pediatric Critical Care
- Forensic Traumatology
- Pharmacovigilance

==== Undergraduate Programmes ====
- B.Sc. in Medical Laboratory Technology
- B.Sc. in Operation Theatre Technology
- B.Sc. in Nursing
- Diploma in Dental Hygiene
- Diploma in Dental Mechanics
- MBBS

=== Courses ===
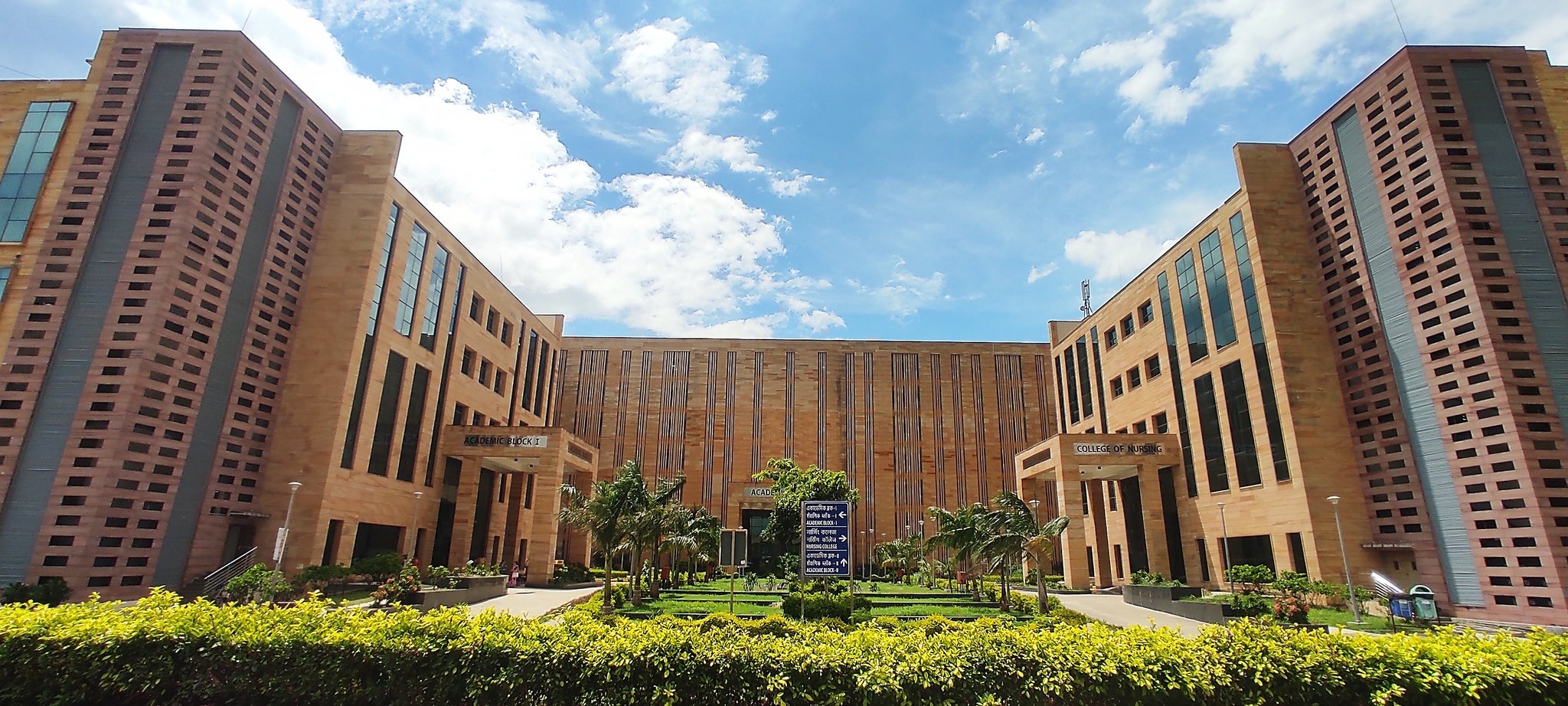
Medical College of AIIMS Kalyani.

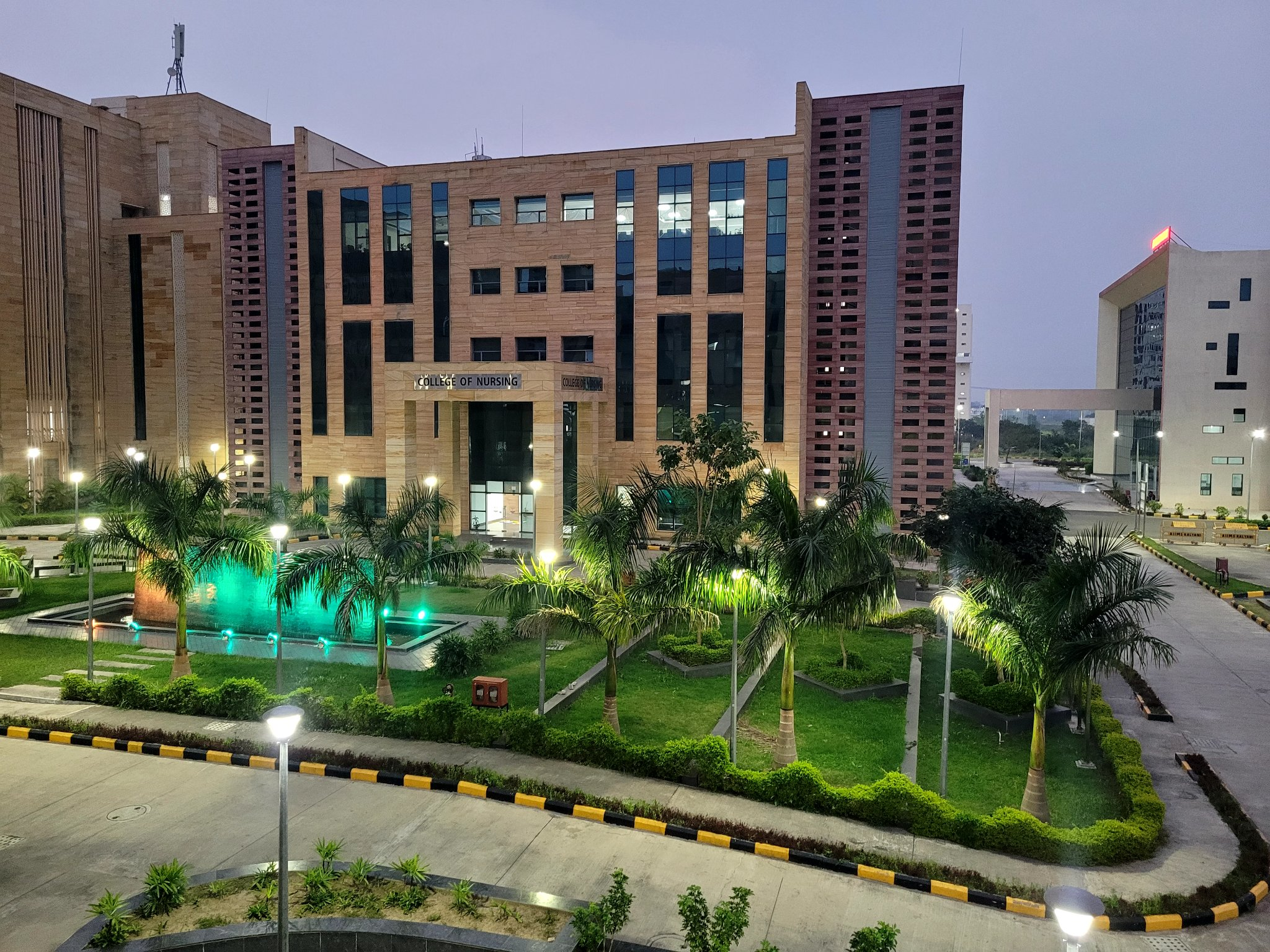
College of Nursing under All India Institute of Medical Sciences, Kalyani.

The institute offers both Undergraduate and Postgraduate degree courses. MBBS and B.Sc. Nursing courses are offered under Undergraduate degree. MD, MS, and MDS courses are offered under Postgraduate degree. The institute offers MD, MS, and MDS courses in 16 different subjects. From January 2025 institute started to intake Super-specialty courses DM, M.Ch. with capacity of 8 number of seat also started PhD program in various departments.

=== Research and Collaborations ===
AIIMS Kalyani has been closely associated with research activities since its establishment. Research in medicine and allied sciences is one of the major functions of AIIMS Kalyani. A total of 12 research projects have been initiated by the faculty members of AIIMS Kalyani in 2019–20. The institute runs a Short Term Studentship (STS) scheme under Indian Council of Medical Research (ICMR). Recent projects include ICMR-funded bacteriophage repository and WB-DSTBT-funded snakebite point-of-care testing in the Microbiology Department. The Institute signed MoU with another premier Institution IISER Kolkata for further Research & Development opportunities in Jan 2020. signed a MoU for development of a collaborative platform for academic and research promotion and potential faculty and students exchange program in near future with NIBMG, IIIT Kalyani in September 2021. In July 2023 signed an agreement with IIT Kharagpur for collaboration in education, research and medical services.

On December 17, 2024, Power Grid Corporation of India signed a MoU with Institute to provide ten remote operation theatre tables and six anesthesia workstations. Funded under a Corporate Social Responsibility (CSR) initiative, the project carries a total valuation of ₹5.37 crore.

=== Central library ===
The central library at the campus was started in March 2021. It was inaugurated on 8 March 2021, by Executive Director Ramji Singh. Unified Library Services for AIIMS Kalyani Central Library started on 27 March 2021. digital library on the campus gives students access to larger resources.

The library building consists of three floors (ground, first and second floors) with a carpet area of 2,608.596 square feet and a seating capacity of about 250 persons. The library is open up to 9pm, 7 days a week including Sundays and holidays, except national holidays. Its current collection consists of 800 printed books.

=== Rankings and reputation ===
The Institution achieved major milestones by securing NABL accreditations for its core laboratories. The Clinical Biochemistry Laboratory received certification in October 2025 , followed by the Department of Pathology & Laboratory Medicine in April 2026. Both facilities met the rigorous ISO 15189:2022 international quality standards for medical testing competence.

== Patient care ==
On 27 January 2021, outpatient department (OPD) service was opened at the permanent campus, with departments of general medicine, general surgery obstetrics and gynaecology, paediatrics, dermatology, ophthalmology, ENT and Psychiatry.

On 26 February 2024 Prime Minister Narendra Modi inaugurated Inpatient care (IPD) services with 360 operational in-patients beds and 18 ICU beds. In 2024, authorities of the institution requested Government of West Bengal to let Swasthya Sathi scheme to be provided in the hospital.

As of early 2026, the institute has hit several critical milestones that significantly enhance its capacity for advanced patient care, emergency response, and digital accessibility. In January 2026, the Union Minister for Health and Family Welfare, J.P. Nadda, inaugurated a suite of high-impact facilities that transition the hospital into a full-scale tertiary care provider like Trauma and Emergency Medicine, Radiation Oncology, Pneumatic Tube System, Cardiac Cath Lab & CPB Machine.

At institution inaugurated an advanced fractional CO2 laser unit under its Department of Burns and Plastic Surgery. Procured via a CSR initiative, this facility became the first of its kind within an Indian government hospital, providing affordable reconstructive and aesthetic treatments.

=== Hospital Services ===
In 2024, the corridors of AIIMS Kalyani hummed with the steady pulse of a growing healthcare hub. The annual data recorded a total of 407,185 OPD attendances, marking a significant chapter in the institution’s regional impact. Behind this figure lay a complex logistical operation, balancing specialized consultations with the demands of an expanding patient base. While the sheer volume of visitors highlighted the facility's reach, internal statistics emphasized a focus on accessibility. Over 8,600 general beneficiaries and 2,635 PMJAY participants received treatment, integrating social welfare into clinical practice. Supported by over 450,000 laboratory tests, the year served as a quantitative testament to the hospital’s operational capacity, reflecting a structured effort to meet the healthcare needs of a diverse population.

== Student Life ==
=== TEDxAIIMS Kalyani ===
‘’‘TEDxAIIMS Kalyani’’’ is an independently organised TEDx event held at AIIMS Kalyani, West Bengal, bringing together speakers from medicine, academia, research and diverse professional backgrounds to share ideas and personal experiences. The event was organised under the TEDx programme, with ‘’‘Ajinkya Budle’’’ serving as its organiser and licensee. Its speaker lineup included figures such as ‘’‘Dr. Sumer Sethi, Dr. Ankita Pandey, Dr. Tara Rajendran, Dr. Priyanka Chatterjee, Dheeraj Rathi, Prof. Sasi Kanta Dash’’’ and ‘’‘Col. Prof. Dr. Ajay Mallick’’’. Through a combination of TED-style talks, performances and interdisciplinary perspectives, TEDxAIIMS Kalyani seeks to create a platform for dialogue, curiosity and the exchange of ideas beyond the boundaries of medical education.

=== ELYSSIA - The Annual Socio-cultural Fest ===
‘‘Elyssia 2.0’’ was the second edition of the annual socio-cultural festival of AIIMS Kalyani, building upon the institute’s emerging tradition of student-led cultural celebrations. The festival expanded the scope of its predecessor by bringing together a diverse programme of performing arts, creative competitions, fashion and live musical entertainment.

The festival featured a wide range of cultural and competitive events organised through the institute’s student clubs and organising teams. Its programme encompassed music, dance, literary and creative activities, alongside a dedicated fashion show, providing students with platforms for both competitive and non-competitive artistic expression.

A major attraction of Elyssia 2.0 was its series of professional performances and evening programmes. The festival featured live performances by ‘’Papon’’ and ‘‘Delete’’ as well as DJ performances by ‘‘DJ Tasha’’ and ‘‘DJ Koyel’’. These programmes formed the entertainment component of the festival alongside its daytime competitions and student performances.

Elyssia 2.0 was organised by a student organising committee comprising members of the ‘‘2022 MBBS batch’’, with ‘Ajinkya Budle’ leading the organising committee. The committee coordinated the festival’s various clubs, competitions, stage programmes and associated activities, contributing to the expansion of Elyssia as a major cultural event within AIIMS Kalyani.

Through its combination of student-led competitions, club activities, fashion, live music and professional performances, Elyssia 2.0 represented the continuing development of AIIMS Kalyani’s cultural traditions and provided students with a platform to engage beyond the academic environment.

=== Academic Festival ===
Limbus, the annual academic and literary festival of AIIMS Kalyani, serves as a premier platform for intellectual exchange and creative expression. Typically organized in April, the event transitions the campus into a center for high-level discourse. The festival features a diverse itinerary, including clinical case-solving competitions, medical quizzes, and parliamentary debates that challenge the analytical capabilities of participants.

Beyond its academic core, Limbus incorporates literary activities such as poetry slams and creative writing workshops. By integrating medical science with the humanities, the fest encourages holistic development and provides a scholarly outlet for the student community.

== Criticisms and controversies ==
On May 20, 2022, the CID West Bengal registered an FIR at the Nadia Police Station following a complaint by Sariful Islam, a resident of Murshidabad. Islam, who was himself an applicant at AIIMS, alleged widespread corruption and the illicit exercise of political influence regarding the institution's recruitment or administrative processes.

A FIR has been registered against four high-ranking BJP representatives, including former Union Minister of State for Education Subhas Sarkar, regarding allegations of recruitment irregularities at AIIMS, Kalyani. The case alleges that the officials used their positions to influence the hiring process in favor of their relatives. As part of the ongoing investigation, authorities have already questioned family members of two of the named BJP MLAs to verify the circumstances of their appointments.

=== Calcutta High Courts Judgement ===
What’s the use of setting up an AIIMS in the state if infrastructural help has to be sought from a state hospital?, Does AIIMS Kalyani have an operating theatre? If yes, how many surgeries were held in the hospital?, The institution has been offering courses to best of the students across the country at the graduation and post-graduation level in the field of medical sciences. The institute is not restricted for only academic purposes but also for rendering services to patients who are suffering from acute diseases. If an AIIMS is situated within a state, the common man at large should be benefited by the services of the best of the doctors who are ready, but they are not having a support system to execute their ability.

— Justice Tirthankar Ghosh of the Calcutta High Court,

While presiding over a petition for the autopsy of a minor girl—a victim of a heinous rape and murder in West Bengal's Joynagar area—Justice Tirthankar Ghosh of the Calcutta High Court issued a significant directive to the Government of India. The Court has ordered a comprehensive overhaul of the infrastructure at AIIMS Kalyani, mandating that it be upgraded to match the standards and capabilities of AIIMS Delhi.
