= Ramesh C. Deka =

Indian otorhinolaryngologist (born 1948)

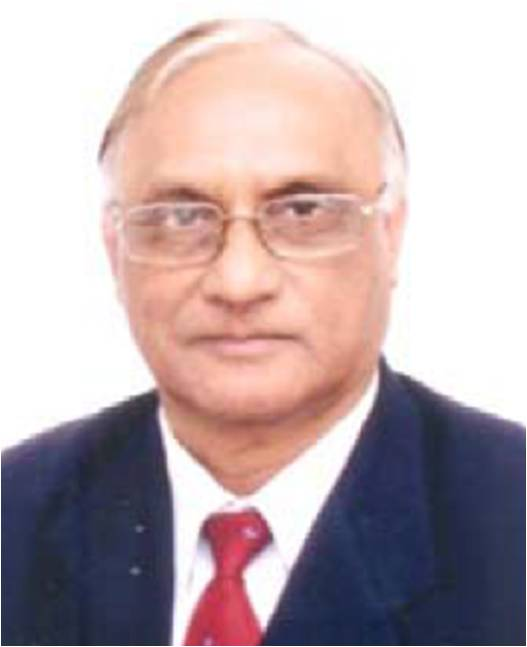
- Born: 1 October 1948 (age 78); Assam, India
- Education: Gauhati Medical College and Hospital (GMCH); All India Institute of Medical Sciences, New Delhi
- Known for: First Bilateral Cochlear Surgery in India
- Awards: Kamal Kumari National Award 2010; Lifetime Achievement Award on the Health Summit 2010; Rashtriya Ratan Award; Bharat Gaurav Award; One of the Top 100 Most Trusted People in India' (Reader's Digest Survey of 2010 : Who do you trust, India ?)
- Scientific career
- Fields: Otorhinolaryngology
- Workplaces: All India Institute of Medical Sciences, New Delhi

Ramesh C. Deka (born 1 October 1948) is an Indian Ear, Nose and Throat (ENT) specialist and the former director of All India Institute of Medical Sciences, New Delhi, which is globally recognised as the premier medical institute of India. He is one of the pioneers of cochlear implant surgery in India and performed the country's first bilateral cochlear implantation surgery.

== Education ==
Deka obtained his MBBS degree from the Gauhati Medical College and Hospital (GMCH) in 1969 and his MS (ENT) from AIIMS in 1973.

== Awards, honours and guest lectures ==
=== For medical services and research ===
In 2010, Deka was awarded the Kamal Kumari National Award for Science and Technology.

=== Other awards ===
Deka was nominated as one of the "Top 100 Most Trusted People in India". His other awards include:

- Rashtriya Ratan Award (January 1999) from Vishwa Jagriti Mission, a sociocultural organization, for his scientific contribution, especially for his pioneering work in Cochlear implant surgery in India and services to deaf people
- Bharat Gaurav Award for outstanding medical services
- Best Citizen of India (2007) from International Publishing House

=== Guest lectures ===
Deka delivered guest lectures as an invited faculty and distinguished visiting professor at leading centres and institutions in around 20 countries. (Note: Australia, France, USA, Germany, Italy, Denmark, Japan, Indonesia, Malaysia, Philippines, Thailand, Taiwan, Republic of Korea, Bangladesh, Nepal, Sri Lanka, Riyadh (Kingdom of Saudi Arabia), Dubai (UAE) and Russia.) He has also given guest lectures and orations at a large number of national and international conferences, seminars, and symposia. He delivered the valedictory address in a workshop of the Zonal Task Force on the Revised National Tuberculosis Control Programme at SRM University in Kattankulathur on 3 September 2010. Deka delivered an inaugural address at the National Seminar on "Education for Cultural Sustainability" organised by Amity Institute of Education (AIE), New Delhi, sponsored by the National University for Educational Planning and Administration (NUPEA) at Amity University Campus on 30 March 2011. Deka addressed the convocation ceremony at Pushpagiri Institute of Medical Sciences and Research Centre in Thiruvalla on 28 November 2011.

== Contribution to cochlear implant surgery facility and teaching at AIIMS ==
Deka worked in the Cochlear Implant Facility at the ENT department AIIMS, developing rehabilitation activities for patient care and conducting research in this field. The facility promotes clinical research and rehabilitation for patients with bilateral profound deafness, both in children and adults. So far, over 300 cochlear implant surgeries have been done under this facility successfully, the largest number among government facilities in India.

Nucleus 5, a fifth-generation cochlear implant, was implanted in the ear of a three-year-old hearing-impaired child at AIIMS. This was regarded as a breakthrough in cochlear implant design and technology. Deka provided leadership, along with his highly qualified team of audiologists and speech therapists, to address cochlear implantee support in Sri Lanka. He has helped many other centres in India develop the facilities for cochlear implant surgery and rehabilitation of deaf people, such as in the Post Graduate Institute of Medical Education and Research, Chandigarh; Railway Hospital, New Delhi; and Army Hospital (Research and Referral), New Delhi.

== Controversies ==
Deka was appointed Dean of AIIMS as a reward for his loyalty to then-health minister Ambumani Ramdoss, who was in conflict with then-director Dr. P. Venugopal on the issue of reservation and autonomy of the AIIMS. Deka favored the minister for implementation of the Moily Committee. Deka was 24th on the seniority list; however, per the rules, the senior-most professor should have been appointed dean. He smiled when students of AIIMS DELHI protested in front of director's house demanding justice for suicide of student Anil Meena('Placebo' documentary by Abhay Kumar, 1:10:05).

== Major publications ==
- Thakar A, Gupta G, Bhalla AS, Jain V, Sharma SC, Sharma R, Bahadur S & Deka RC. (2011). Adjuvant therapy with flutamide for presurgical volume reduction in juvenile nasopharyngeal angiofibroma. Head Neck. 33:1747–53.
- Ramavat A, Kumar R, Venkatakarthikeyan C, Jain A & Deka RC. (2010). Modified lateral rhinotomy for fronto-ethmoid schwannoma in a child: a case report. Cases J. 3:64.
- Bhat R, Sharma VK & Deka RC. (2007). Otorhinolaryngologic manifestations of leprosy. Int J Dermatol. 46:600-6.
- Anjaneyulu C & Deka RC. (2004).Heterotopic neuroglial tissue in hard palate. Indian J Pediatr. 71:451-2
- Ohtani I, Baba Y, Suzuki T, Suzuki C, Kano M & Deka RC. (2003) Why is otosclerosis of low prevalence in Japanese ? Otol Neurotol. 24:377-81.
- Baruah P & Deka RC. (2003). Endoscopic management of inverted papillomas of the nose and paranasal sinuses. Ear Nose Throat J. 82:317-20.
- Kumar A, Deka RC & Jha D. (2002). Endoscopic removal of localised angiofibroma. J Otolaryngol. 31:41-4.
- Jha D, Deka RC & Sharma MC. (2001). Tuberculosis of the maxillary sinus manifesting as a facial abscess. Ear Nose Throat J. 81:102-4.
- Thakar A, Anjaneyulu C & Deka RC. (2001). Vertigo syndromes and mechanisms in migraine. J Laryngol Otol. 115:782-7.
- Saksena R, Jayaswal A & Deka RC. (2001). Low cost invasive blood pressure monitoring—a new technique. Trop Gastroenterol. 22:31-2.
- Jha D & Deka RC. (2000). Congenital supraglottic cyst: a rare cause of stridor. Indian J Pediatr. 67:311-2.
- Ramesh A & Deka RC, Vijayaraghavan M, Ray R, Kabra SK, Rakesh K & Manoj K. (2000). Entomophthoromycosis of the nose and paranasal sinus. Indian J Pediatr. 67:307-10.
- Ahluwalia KB, Maheshwari N & Deka RC. (1997). Rhinosporidiosis: a study that resolves etiologic controversies. Am J Rhinol. 11:479-83.
- Deka RC. (1996). Acute otitis media. Indian Pediatr. 33:832-6.
- Deka RC. (1994). Middle ear effusion: its management. Indian Pediatr. 31:631-3.
- Deka RC. (1993). Management of hearing impaired children. Indian Pediatr. 30:977-80.
- Deka RC. (1992). Auditory brainstem evoked responses in infants and children. Indian J Pediatr. 59:361-6.
- Tandon DA, Bahadur S, Misra NK, Deka RC & Kapila K. (1992). Parapharyngeal neurofibromas. J Laryngol Otol. 106:243-6.
- Kochhar LK, Deka RC, Kacker SK & Raman EV. (1990). Hearing loss after head injury. Ear Nose Throat J. 69:537-42.
- Misra A, Dash SC, Deka RC & Malhotra KK. (1989). Vestibular functions in conservatively treated chronic renal failure. J Assoc Physicians India. 37:189-91.
- Deka RC. (1988). Facial palsy and mastoid surgery. Ear Nose Throat J. 67:531-6.
- Tandon DA, Deka RC, Chaudhary C & Misra NK. (1988). Giant cell tumour of the temporosphenoidal region. J Laryngol Otol. 102:449-51.
- Dev A, Ghosh P & Deka RC. (1988). Acquired tracheo-oesophageal fistula (a case report). J Laryngol Otol. 102:378-9.
- Deka RC, Kacker SK & Tandon PN. (1987). Auditory brain-stem evoked responses in cerebellopontile angle tumors. Arch Otolaryngol Head Neck Surg. 113:647-50.
- Sooknundun M, Kacker SK, Bhatia R & Deka RC. (1986). Nasal septal deviation: effective intervention and long term follow-up. Int J Pediatr Otorhinolaryngol. 12:65–72.
- Sooknundun M, Deka RC, Kacker SK & Kapila K. (1986) Congenital mid-line sinus of the dorsum of the nose. Two case reports with a literature survey. J Laryngol Otol. 100:1319–22.
- Deka RC, Deka D, Kacker SK & Tandon DA. (1986). Auditory brainstem evoked response in at risk children. Indian J Pediatr. 53:651-6.
- Sooknundun M, Deka RC, Kacker SK & Verma IC. (1986). Nasal septal deviation at birth and its diagnosis. Indian J Pediatr. 53:105-8.
- Tandon DA, Deka RC & Chowdhury C. (1985). Mucoepidermoid carcinoma of the larynx. Ear Nose Throat J. 64:555-7.
- Bhatia R, Bhatia P, Pathak AP & Deka RC. (1985). Nasal deformity in children. Indian J. Pediatr. 52:413-6.
- Bhatia R & Deka RC. (1984). Treacher-Collins syndrome with deviated nasal septum.Indian J Pediatr. 51:739-41.
- Bhatia R, Kaker SK, Sood VP, Verma IC & Deka RC. (1984). Correlation of birth weightand head circumference with deviated nasal septum in newborns—a preliminary report. Indian J Pediatr. 51:649-51.
- Bhatia R & Deka RC. (1984). Choanal atresia: a report of 3 cases. Indian J Pediatr.51:493-5.
- Deka RC. (1983). Facial nerve surgery in children. Indian J Pediatr. 50:643-6.
- Choudhury P, Deka RC & Puri RK. (1981). An unusual foreign body in the subglotticregion. Indian Pediatr. 18:269.
- Deka RC. (1980). Middle-ear carcinoma in a girl of eighteen. J Laryngol Otol. 94:429-31.
- Witter HL, Deka RC, Lipscomb DM & Shambaugh GE. (1980). Effects of prestimulatory carbogen inhalation on noise-induced temporary threshold shifts in humans and chinchilla. Am J Otol. 1:227-32.
- Deka RC, Kacker SK, Ghosh PP & Roy S. (1979). Whole-organ sections of the larynx and hypopharynx. Ear Nose Throat J. 58:173-80.
- Deka RC, Kacker SK & Shambaugh GE Jr. (1978). Intestinal absorption of fluoride preparations. Laryngoscope. 88:1918–21.
- Deka RC, Ghosh P & Kacker SK. (1977). Streptomycin ototoxicity: an audiologic and vestibular study. Ear Nose Throat J. 56:218-24.
- Deka RC & Kacker SK. (1975). Chronic otitis media—a clinical and bacteriological study. Eye Ear Nose Throat Mon. 54:198–201.
