= GNRC =

Indian chain of private hospitals

GNRC Hospitals
- Company type: Private
- Industry: Healthcare
- Founded: 1987; 39 years ago
- Founder: Dr. Nomal Chandra Borah
- Headquarters: Guwahati, India
- Number of locations: Guwahati & Kolkata (Barasat)
- Area served: Asia
- Products: Hospitals, pharmacy, home care
- Website: gnrchospitals.com

GNRC (formerly known as Guwahati Neurological Research Centre) is a healthcare Centre in North East India. It was established in 1987 by neurologist Dr. Nomal Chandra Borah. At present, it operates 5 hospitals – GNRC Dispur, GNRC Sixmile, GNRC Medical (Amingaon), GNRC Good Health and GNRC Medical Barasat in Kolkata under GNRC Community Hospitals Limited, formed in 2001.
