= Twelfth Five Year Plan (India) =

The Twelfth Five Year plan for health services in India covering 2012-2017 was formulated based on the recommendation of a High Level Experts Group (HLEG) and other stakeholder consultations. The long-term objective of this strategy is to establish a system of Universal Health Coverage (UHC) in the country. Key points include:

1. Substantial expansion and strengthening of public sector health care system, freeing the vulnerable population from dependence on high cost and often unreachable private sector health care system.
2. Health sector expenditure by central government and state government, both plan and non-plan, will have to be substantially increased by the twelfth five-year plan. It was increased from 0.94 per cent of GDP in tenth plan to 1.04 per cent in eleventh plan. The provision of clean drinking water and sanitation as one of the principal factors in control of diseases is well established from the history of industrialized countries and it should have high priority in health related resource allocation. The expenditure on health should increased to 2.5 per cent of GDP by the end of Twelfth Five Year Plan.
3. Financial and managerial system will be redesigned to ensure efficient utilization of available resources and achieve better health outcome. Coordinated delivery of services within and across sectors, delegation matched with accountability, fostering a spirit of innovation are some of the measures proposed.
4. Increasing the cooperation between private and public sector health care providers to achieve health goals. This will include contracting in of services for gap filling, and various forms of effectively regulated and managed Public-Private Partnership, while also ensuring that there is no compromise in terms of standards of delivery and that the incentive structure does not undermine health care objectives.
5. The present Rashtriya Swasthya Bima Yojana (RSBY) which provides cash less in-patient treatment through an insurance based system should be reformed to enable access to a continuum of comprehensive primary, secondary and tertiary care. In twelfth plan period entire Below Poverty Line (BPL) population will be covered through RSBY scheme. In planning health care structure for the future, it is desirable to move from a 'fee-for-service' mechanism, to address the issue of fragmentation of services that works to the detriment of preventive and primary care and also to reduce the scope of fraud and induced demand.
6. In order to increase the availability of skilled human resources, a large expansion of medical schools, nursing colleges, and so on, is therefore necessary and public sector medical schools must play a major role in the process. Special effort will be made to expand medical education in states which are under-served. In addition, a massive effort will be made to recruit and train paramedical and community level health workers.
7. The multiplicity of Central sector or Centrally Sponsored Schemes has constrained the flexibility of states to make need based plans or deploy their resources in the most efficient manner. The way forward is to focus on strengthening the pillars of the health system, so that it can prevent, detect and manage each of the unique challenges that different parts of the country face.
8. A series of prescription drugs reforms, promotion of essential, generic medicine and making these universally available free of cost to all patients in public facilities as a part of the Essential Health Package will be a priority.
9. Effective regulation in medical practice, public health, food and drugs is essential to safeguard people against risks and unethical practices. This is especially so given the information gaps in the health sector which make it difficult for individual to make reasoned choices.
10. The health system in the Twelfth Plan will continue to have a mix of public and private service providers. The public sector health services need to be strengthened to deliver both public health related and clinical services. The public and private sectors also need to coordinate for the delivery of a continuum of care. A strong regulatory system would supervise the quality of services delivered. Standard treatment guidelines should form the basis of clinical care across public and private sectors, with the adequate monitoring by the regulatory bodies to improve the quality and control the cost of care,

== Criticism ==
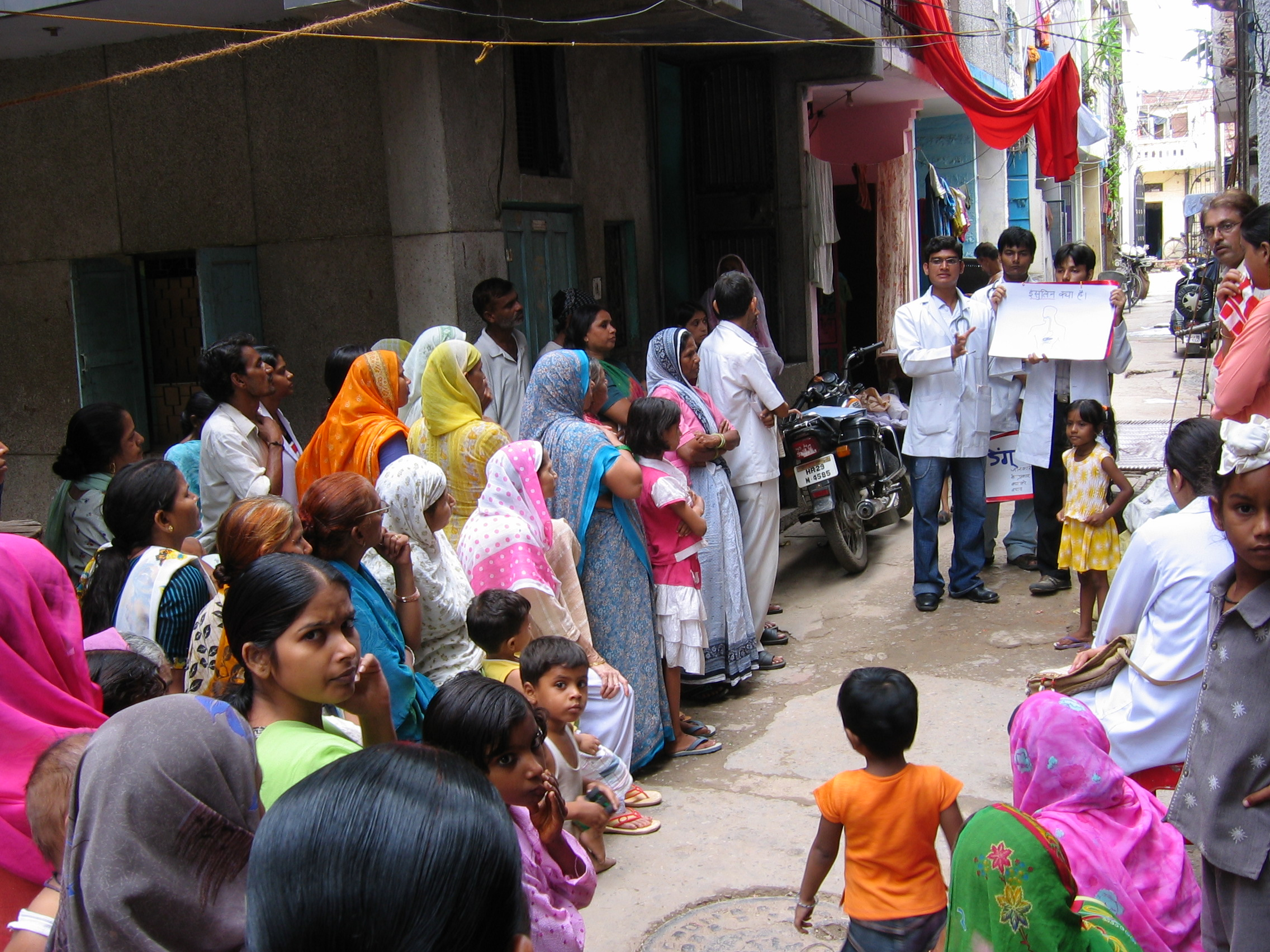
Students educating people about mosquito-borne diseases.

The High Level Expert Group report recommends an increase in public expenditure on health from 1.58 per cent of GDP currently to 2.1 per cent of GDP by the end of the 12th five-year plan. However, even this is far lower than the global median of 5 per cent. The lack of extensive and adequately funded public health services pushes large numbers of people to incur heavy out of pocket expenditures on services purchased from the private sector. Out of pocket expenditures arise even in public sector hospitals, since lack of medicines means that patients have to buy them. This results in a very high financial burden on families in case of severe illness. Though, the 12th plan document express concern over high out-of-pocket (OOP) expenditure, it does not give any target or time frame for reducing this expense . OOP can be reduced only by increasing public expenditure on health and by setting up widespread public health service providers. But the planning commission is planning to do this by regulating private health care providers. It takes solace from the HLEG report which admits that, "the transformation of India's health system to become an effective platform for UHC is an evolutionary process that will span several years".

Instead of developing a better public health system with enhanced health budget, 12th five-year plan document plans to hand over health care system to private institutions. The 12th plan document causes concern over Rashtriya Swasthya Bhima Yojana being used as a medium to hand over public funds to the private sector through an insurance route. This has also incentivised unnecessary treatment which in due course will increase costs and premiums. There have been complaints about high transaction cost for this scheme due to insurance intermediaries. RSBY does not take into consideration state specific variation in disease profiles and health needs. Even though these things are acknowledged in the report, no alternative remedy is given. There is no reference to nutrition as key component of health and for universal Public Distribution System (PDS) in the plan document or HLEG recommendation. In the section of National Rural Health Mission (NRHM) in the document, the commitment to provide 30- to 50-bed Community Health Centres (CHC) per 100 000 population is missing from the main text. It was easy for the government to recruit poor women as ASHA (Accredited Social Health Activist) workers but it has failed to bring doctors, nurses and specialist in this area. The ASHA workers who are coming from a poor background are given incentive based on performance. These people lose many days job undertaking their task as ASHA worker which is not incentivised properly. Even the 12th plan doesn't give any solace. To summarize, successive administrative and political reforms have conveniently bypassed training citizens and local bodies to actively participate in healthcare. In a situation where people are not enabled to identify poor quality, speak up and debate. There is dire need for the health system to fill that role on behalf of the people and can be easily done by decentralization of healthcare governance.

A recent study pointed out that access to advanced medical facilities under a single roof was the main reason for the choice of private hospitals in both rural and urban areas. The second major reason for private healthcare preference was proximity of the facility in the rural area and approachability and friendly conduct of doctors and staff in the urban centers.
