= Kulia, Nadia =

Kulia
- Census Town
- Kulia Pat Temple

- Location in West Bengal, India Kulia (India)
- Coordinates: 22.9794°N 88.4902°E
- Country: India
- State: West Bengal
- District: Nadia

Area
  - Total: 3.8587 km^{2} (1.4899 sq mi)

Population (2011)
  - Total: 10,406
  - Density: 2,696.8/km^{2} (6,984.6/sq mi)

Languages
  - Official: Bengali, English
- Time zone: UTC+5:30 (IST)
- PIN: 741245
- Telephone/STD code: 03454
- Lok Sabha constituency: Ranaghat
- Vidhan Sabha constituency: Chakdaha
- Website: nadia.gov.in

Kulia is a census town in the Chakdaha CD block in the Kalyani subdivision of the Nadia district in the state of West Bengal, India.

== Geography ==
Cities and towns in Kalyani subdivision of Nadia district
M: municipal town/ city/notified area, CT: census town, R: rural/ urban centre.
Owing to space constraints in the small map, the actual locations in a larger map may vary slightly

=== Location ===
Kulia is located at 22.9794°N 88.4902°E.

According to the map of Chakdaha CD block, in the District Census Handbook 2011, Nadia, Chanduria, Priyanagar, Shimurali, Jangal, Madanpur, Saguna and Kulia form a cluster of census towns between Chakdaha and Kalyani/ Gayespur.

=== Area overview ===
Nadia district is part of the large alluvial plain formed by the Ganges-Bhagirathi system. The Kalyani subdivision has the Bhagirathi/ Hooghly on the west. Topographically, Kalyani subdivision is a part of the Ranaghat-Chakdaha Plain, the low-lying area found in the south-eastern part of the district. The smallest subdivision in the district, area-wise, has the highest level of urbanisation in the district. 76.73% of the population lives in urban areas and 23.27% lives in the rural areas.

Note: The map alongside presents some of the notable locations in the subdivision. All places marked in the map are linked in the larger full screen map. All the four subdivisions are presented with maps on the same scale – the size of the maps vary as per the area of the subdivision.

== History ==
Great religious and social leader Chaitanya Mahaprabhu stopped at Kulia village while going to Kumarhatta or Halisahar. He came to forgive the sin of one Debananda and turned him faithful to Lord Krishna. The Kulia Pat Temple popularly known as Aparadh Bhanjan path, beside Kulia jhill (a part of Jamuna river) is a holy place of Vaishnav religion.

== Demographics ==
According to the 2011 Census of India, Kulia had a total population of 10,406, of which 5,434 (52%) were males and 4,972 (48%) were females. Population in the age range 0–6 years was 924. The total number of literate persons in Kulia was 8,126 (85.70% of the population over 6 years).

== Infrastructure ==
According to the District Census Handbook 2011, Nadia, Kulia covered an area of 3.8587 km^{2}. Among the civic amenities, the protected water supply involved hand pump. It had 1,019 domestic electric connections. Among the medical facilities it had 1 veterinary hospital. Among the educational facilities it had 1 primary school, other school facilities at Kalyani 1 km away.
