= Madanpur, India =

Madanpur
- Census Town
- Location in West Bengal, India Madanpur (India)
- Coordinates: 23.02°N 88.48°E
- Country: India
- State: West Bengal
- District: Nadia

Government
  - Type: Gram Panchayat
  - Body: Madanpur GP I Madanpur GP II
- Elevation: 9 m (30 ft)

Population (2011)
  - Total: 13,675

Languages
  - Official: Bengali, English
- Time zone: UTC+5:30 (IST)
- PIN: 741245
- Vehicle registration: WB
- Website: nadia.nic.in

Madanpur is a census town in Kalyani Community Development Block in the Kalyani subdivision of the Nadia district in the Indian state of West Bengal.

== History ==
Madangopal temple in Madanpur

In the middle of the eighteenth century when the railways were yet to come to Bengal, the present day area of Madanpur (situated on the bank of river Ganges) was full of grassland. The current station area was located entirely in the river bed. People started to reside here after 1750. The origins of the name 'Madanpur' maybe traced to a popular myth in which Thakur Madangopal who accompanied with Sri Radha took rest at this place on their way to Krishnanagar. The people of the village were very much happy with this and they started worshipping Lord Madangopal. From then on people started calling this place 'Madanpur' which means the place of Madangopal. Even today, there still remains the temple of Thakur Madangopal near Birohi.

== Geography ==
Cities and towns in Kalyani subdivision of Nadia district
M: municipal town/ city/notified area, CT: census town, R: rural/ urban centre.
Owing to space constraints in the small map, the actual locations in a larger map may vary slightly

=== Cluster ===
According to the map of Chakdaha CD block, in the District Census Handbook 2011, Nadia, Chanduria, Priyanagar, Shimurali, Jangal, Madanpur, Saguna and Kulia form a cluster of census towns between Chakdaha and Kalyani/ Gayespur.

=== Area overview ===
Nadia district is part of the large alluvial plain formed by the Ganges-Bhagirathi system. The Kalyani subdivision has the Bhagirathi/ Hooghly on the west. Topographically, Kalyani subdivision is a part of the Ranaghat-Chakdaha Plain, the low-lying area found in the south-eastern part of the district. The smallest subdivision in the district, area-wise, has the highest level of urbanisation in the district. 76.73% of the population lives in urban areas and 23.27% lives in the rural areas.

Note: The map alongside presents some of the notable locations in the subdivision. All places marked in the map are linked in the larger full screen map. All the four subdivisions are presented with maps on the same scale – the size of the maps vary as per the area of the subdivision.

=== Location ===
Madanpur is located at 23.02°N 88.48°E. It has an average elevation of 9 m (30 ft). It is situated on the bank of Ganges which is called Hoogly River in this place. Madanpur is full of highly fertile agricultural land. It is spread till Kaliganj in the North, Ishwaripur in the West, Birohi in the East and Kalyani in the South. Madanpur has wide marsh area. Yamuna river, a feeder of Ganges flows through Madanpur to meet Ichhamoti. The source place of Yamuna river is called Tribeni. But, nowadays this river is almost in dying condition. The nearest Bangladesh border (Petrapole) is just about 51 km from Madanpur.

Most of the areas are full of lush green with various types of flora.

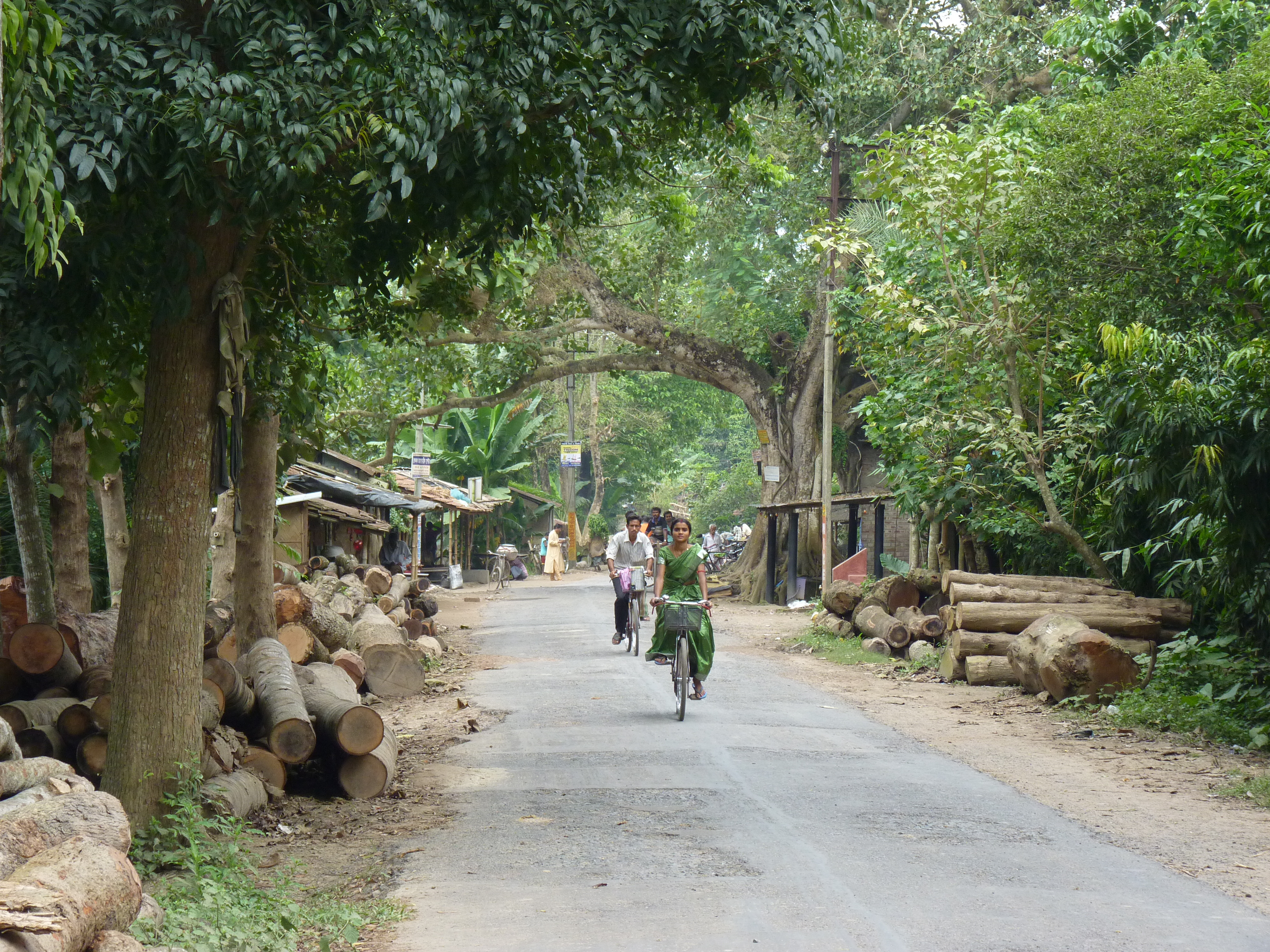

== Demographics ==
According to the 2011 Census of India, Madanpur had a total population of 13,675, of which 6,993 were males and 6,682 were females. Population in the age range 0–6 years was 1,062. The total number of literate persons in Madanpur was 11,823 (93.74% of the population over 6 years).

As of 2001 India census Madanpur had a population of 12,029. Males constitute 52% of the population and females 48%. Madanpur has an average literacy rate of 81%, higher than the national average of 59.5%: male literacy is 85%, and female literacy is 76%. In Madanpur, 9% of the population is under 6 years of age.

== Infrastructure ==
According to the District Census Handbook 2011, Nadia, Madanpur covered an area of 3.3 km^{2}. Among the civic amenities, the protected water supply involved overhead tank, tubewell/ borewell, hand pump. It had 1,358 domestic electric connections. Among the medical facilities it had 1 veterinary hospital, 7 medicine shops. Among the educational facilities it had 4 primary schools, 2 senior secondary schools. Three important commodities it produced were paddy, jute, vegetables. It had the branch office of 1 nationalised bank.

== Economy ==
=== Financial Services ===
There are nationalized banks, cooperatives and micro-financing institutions supporting the agrarian economy of the region. However, unorganised money lenders dominate the financing needs of small traders in the urgency of money.

1. State Bank of India
2. Punjab National Bank formerly United Bank of India
3. District Co-operative Bank
4. Bandhan Bank

== Transport ==
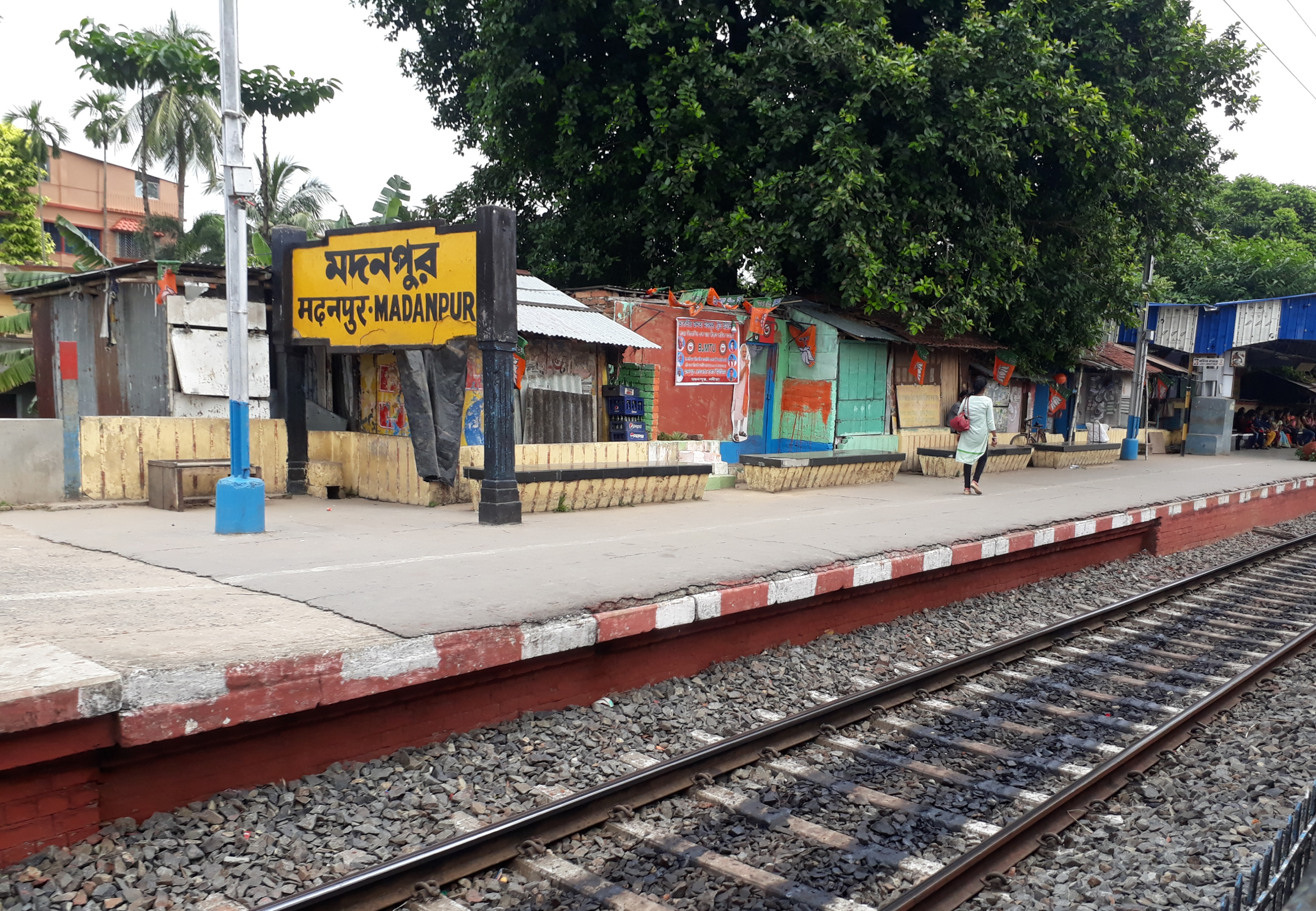
Madanpur railway station

Madanpur railway station is situated on the Sealdah-Ranaghat Line of the Kolkata Suburban Railway.

Madanpur stands on State Highway 1 that links it to National Highway 12.

== Education ==
There are three higher secondary schools following the "10+2" plan run by the state government. The schools are affiliated to the West Bengal Board of Secondary Education and to the West Bengal Council of Higher Secondary Education.

- Madanpur Kendriya Adarsha Vidyalaya (HS) for Girls,
- Madanpur Kendriya Adarsha Vidyalaya (HS) for Boys
- Alaipur Manorama Siksha Niketan (HS)

The government run primary schools are:

- Purbapara Anganwari School
- Purbapara Prathamik Vidyalaya
- 1 No. Gobindnagar Primary School
- Kalyan Nagar Math Para School
- Majdia Sri Gouranga Primary School

== Attractions of Madanpur ==
- Temple of Madangopal (Lord Krishna) - Birohi, besides 34 National Highway, 6 km away from Madanpur Railway Station.
- Sayantani Kali Mandir
- House of Bengali actor Bikash Roy near Kaliganj, Madanpur.
- Alaipur 'Jamunapara' - a natural picnic spot and Kali Maa Mandir
- Dil Park - a family picnic spot near Iswaripur village
- Gouranga Mandir, at Gourangapara.
