= Chanduria =

- Census Town
- Location in West Bengal, India Chanduria (India)
- Coordinates: 23.0483°N 88.5063°E
- Country: India
- State: West Bengal
- District: Nadia

Area
  - Total: 1.9911 km^{2} (0.7688 sq mi)

Population (2011)
  - Total: 12,700
  - Density: 6,380/km^{2} (16,500/sq mi)

Languages
  - Official: Bengali, English
- Time zone: UTC+5:30 (IST)
- PIN: 741248
- Telephone/STD code: 03454
- Lok Sabha constituency: Ranaghat
- Vidhan Sabha constituency: Chakdaha
- Website: nadia.gov.in

Chanduria is a census town in the Chakdaha CD block in the Kalyani subdivision of the Nadia district in the state of West Bengal, India.

== Geography ==
Cities and towns in Kalyani subdivision of Nadia district
M: municipal town/ city/notified area, CT: census town, R: rural/ urban centre.
Owing to space constraints in the small map, the actual locations in a larger map may vary slightly

=== Location ===
Chanduria is located at 23.0043°N 88.5063°E.

According to the map of Chakdaha CD block, in the District Census Handbook 2011, Nadia, Chanduria, Priyanagar, Shimurali, Jangal, Madanpur, Saguna, and Kulia form a cluster of census towns between Chakdaha and Kalyani/ Gayespur.

=== Area overview ===
Nadia district is part of the large alluvial plain formed by the Ganges-Bhagirathi system. The Kalyani subdivision has the Bhagirathi/ Hooghly on the west. Topographically, Kalyani subdivision is a part of the Ranaghat-Chakdaha Plain, the low-lying area found in the south-eastern part of the district. The smallest subdivision in the district, area-wise, has the highest level of urbanisation in the district. 76.73% of the population lives in urban areas and 23.27% lives in the rural areas.

Note: The map alongside presents some of the notable locations in the subdivision. All places marked in the map are linked in the larger full screen map. All the four subdivisions are presented with maps on the same scale – the size of the maps vary as per the area of the subdivision.

== Demographics ==
According to the 2011 Census of India, Chanduria had a total population of 12,700, of which 6,453 (51%) were males and 6,247 (49%) were females. Population in the age range 0–6 years was 1,004. The total number of literate persons in Chanduria was 10,029 (85.75% of the population over 6 years).

== Infrastructure ==
According to the District Census Handbook 2011, Nadia, Chanduria covered an area of 1.9911 km^{2}. Among the civic amenities, the protected water supply involved overhead tank, tubewell/ borewell, hand pump. It had 1,241 domestic electric connections. Among the educational facilities it had 3 primary schools, 2 senior secondary schools.

== Transport ==
Simurali railway station, located nearby, is on the Sealdah-Ranaghat line of the Kolkata Suburban Railway system.
