= Chakdaha (community development block) =

- Community development block
- Country: India
- State: West Bengal
- District: Nadia

Government
  - Type: Community development block

Area
  - Total: 288.80 km^{2} (111.51 sq mi)
- Elevation: 14 m (46 ft)

Population (2011)
  - Total: 405,719
  - Density: 1,404.8/km^{2} (3,638.5/sq mi)

Languages
  - Official: Bengali, English

Literacy (2011)
  - Total literates: 293,946 (64.28%)
- Time zone: UTC+5:30 (IST)
- PIN: 741222
- Telephone/STD code: 03473
- Vehicle registration: WB-51, WB-52
- Lok Sabha constituency: Ranaghat, Bangaon
- Vidhan Sabha constituency: Chakdaha, Haringhata
- Website: nadia.nic.in

Chakdaha is a community development block that forms an administrative division in Kalyani subdivision of Nadia district in the Indian state of West Bengal.

== Geography ==
Chakdaha is located at 23°05′N 88°31′E.

Chakdaha CD Block is bordered by Ranaghat I and Ranaghat II CD Blocks in the north, Bangaon CD Block, in North 24 Parganas district, in the east, Haringhata CD Block and Kanchrapara, Halisahar and Barrackpore I CD Block, in the North 24 Parganas district, in the south and Chinsurah-Mogra CD Block in Hooghly district, across the Hooghly River, in the west.

Nadia district is mostly alluvial plains lying to the east of Hooghly River, locally known as Bhagirathi. The alluvial plains are cut across by such distributaries as Jalangi, Churni and Ichhamati. With these rivers getting silted up, floods are a recurring feature.

Chakdaha CD Block has an area of 288.80 km^{2}. It has 1 panchayat samity, 10 gram panchayats, 307 gram sansads (village councils), 158 mouzas and 137 inhabited villages. Chakdaha police station serves this block. Headquarters of this CD Block is at Chakdaha.

Map of Chakdah block before 2018

Gram panchayats of Chakdaha block/ panchayat samiti are: Chanduria I, Dewli, Dubra, Ghetugachhi, Hingnara, Silinda I, Silinda II, Tatla I, Tatla II and Rautari.

== Demographics ==
=== Population ===
As per the 2011 Census of India, Chakdaha CD Block had a total population of 405,719, of which 314,383 were rural and 91,336 were urban. There were 209,513 (52%) males and 196,206 (48%) females. Population below 6 years was 38,434. Scheduled Castes numbered 185,933 (45.83%) and Scheduled Tribes numbered 21,609 (5.33%).

As per the 2001 census, Chakdaha block had a total population 362,739, out of which 187,025 were males and 175,714 were females. Chakdaha block registered a population growth of 19.52 per cent during the 1991-2001 decade. Decadal growth for the district was 19.51 per cent. Decadal growth in West Bengal was 17.84 per cent.

There are several census towns in Chakdaha CD Block (2011 census figures in brackets): Punglia (6,857), Darappur (8,275), Lalpur (P) (8,356), Chanduria (12,700), Shimurali (5,027), Priyanagar (5,763), Jangal (5,106), Madanpur (13,675), Saguna (P) (14,991) and Kulia (P) (10,406).

Large villages (with 4,000+ population) in Chakdaha CD Block are (2011 census figures in brackets): Balagari Char (5,305), Manaspota (4,544), Sikarpur (4,770), Alaipur (13,754), Rautari (6,563), Chaugachha (8,603), Purba Bishnupur (5,191), Dubra (5,285), Balia (6,014), Balarampur (4,606), Hariankha (6,585), Srinagar (10,483), Muratipur (P) (5,208), Char Kachrapara (4,491), Silinda (7,741) and Chand Mari (P), (8,475).

Other villages in Chakdaha CD Block include (2011 census figures in brackets): Ghetugachhi (2,230), Chuadanga (1,764), Hingnara (1,687) and Sarati (3,284).

=== Literacy ===
As per the 2011 census, the total number of literates in Chakdah CD Block was 293,946 (80.03% of the population over 6 years) out of which males numbered 161,564 (85.14% of the male population over 6 years) and females numbered 132,382 (74.57% of the female population over 6 years). The gender disparity (the difference between female and male literacy rates) was 10.57%.

See also – List of West Bengal districts ranked by literacy rate

Literacy in CD blocks of
Nadia district
Tehatta subdivision
Karimpur I – 67.70%
Karimpur II – 62.04%
Tehatta I – 70.72%
Tehatta II – 68.52%
Krishnanagar Sadar subdivision
Kaliganj – 65.89%
Nakashipara – 64.86%
Chapra – 68.25%
Krishnanagar I – 71.45%
Krishnanagar II – 68.52%
Nabadwip – 67.72%
Krishnaganj – 72.86%
Ranaghat subdivision
Hanskhali – 80.11%
Santipur – 73.10%
Ranaghat I – 77.61%
Ranaghat II – 79.38%
Kalyani subdivision
Chakdaha – 64.17%
Haringhata – 82.15%
Source: 2011 Census: CD Block Wise
Primary Census Abstract Data

=== Language and religion ===
Religion in Chakdah CD block (2011)
Hinduism	83.66%
Islam	14.65%
Sarna	1.22%
Christianity	0.41%
Other or not stated	0.06%

In the 2011 census, there were 339,415 Hindus, forming 83.66% of the population in Chakdaha CD Block. There were 59,451 Muslims, forming 14.65% of the population. Christians numbered 1,657 and formed 0.41% of the population. Others numbered 5,196 and formed 1.28% of the population.

In the 2001 census, Hindus numbered 306,028 and formed 84.31% of the population of Chakdaha CD Block. Muslims numbered 51,790 and formed 14.27% of the population. In the 1991 census, Hindus numbered 257,794 and formed 84.94% of the population of Chakdaha CD Block. Muslims numbered 44,514 and formed 14.67% of the population.

Languages in Chakdah CD block (2011)
1. Bengali (95.6%)
2. Sadri (1.41%)
3. Hindi (1.20%)
4. Others (1.80%)

At the time of the 2011 census, 95.59% of the population spoke Bengali, 1.41% Sadri and 1.20% Hindi as their first language.

== Rural poverty ==
The District Human Development Report for Nadia has provided a CD Block-wise data table for Modified Human Vulnerability Index of the district. Chakdaha CD Block registered 32.60 on the MHPI scale. The CD Block-wise mean MHVI was estimated at 33.92. A total of 8 out of the 17 CD Blocks in Nadia district were found to be severely deprived when measured against the CD Block mean MHVI - Karimpur I and Karimpur II (under Tehatta subdivision), Kaliganj, Nakashipara, Chapra, Krishnanagar I and Nabadwip (under Krishnanagar Sadar subdivision) and Santipur (under Ranaghat subdivision) appear to be backward.

As per the Human Development Report 2004 for West Bengal, the rural poverty ratio in Nadia district was 28.35%. The estimate was based on Central Sample data of NSS 55th round 1999–2000.

== Economy ==
=== Livelihood ===
In Chakdaha CD Block in 2011, amongst the class of total workers, cultivators formed 16.64%, agricultural labourers 29.49%, household industry workers 4.24% and other workers 49.63%.

The southern part of Nadia district starting from Krishnanagar I down to Chakdaha and Haringhata has some urban pockets specialising in either manufacturing or service related economic activity and has reflected a comparatively higher concentration of population but the urban population has generally stagnated. Nadia district still has a large chunk of people living in the rural areas.

=== Infrastructure ===
There are 137 inhabited villages in Chakdaha CD Block. 100% villages have power supply and 136 villages (99.27%) have drinking water supply. 26 Villages (18.98%) have post offices. 119 villages (86.86%) have telephones (including landlines, public call offices and mobile phones). 67 villages (48.91%) have a pucca approach road and 53 villages (38.69%) have transport communication (includes bus service, rail facility and navigable waterways). 19 villages (13.87%) have agricultural credit societies and 16 villages (11.68%) have banks. It should, however, be noted that although 100% villages in Nadia district had power supply in 2011, a survey in 2007-08 revealed that less than 50% of households had electricity connection. In rural areas of the country, the tube well was for many years considered to be the provider of safe drinking water, but with arsenic contamination of ground water claiming public attention it is no longer so. Piped water supply is still a distant dream. In 2007–08, the availability of piped drinking water in Nadia district was as low as 8.6%, well below the state average of around 20%.

=== Agriculture ===
Persons engaged in agriculture
in Chakdaha CD Block
1. Bargadars (2.70%)
2. Patta holders (10.5%)
3. Small farmers (5.64%)
4. Marginal farmers (26.7%)
5. Agricultural labourers (54.4%)

Although the Bargadari Act of 1950 recognised the rights of bargadars to a higher share of crops from the land that they tilled, it was not implemented fully. Large tracts, beyond the prescribed limit of land ceiling, remained with the rich landlords. From 1977 onwards major land reforms took place in West Bengal. Land in excess of land ceiling was acquired and distributed amongst the peasants. Following land reforms land ownership pattern has undergone transformation. In 2013–14, persons engaged in agriculture in Chakdaha CD Block could be classified as follows: bargadars 2.70%, patta (document) holders 10.54%, small farmers (possessing land between 1 and 2 hectares) 5.64%, marginal farmers (possessing land up to 1 hectare) 26.68% and agricultural labourers 54.44%. As the proportion of agricultural labourers is very high, the real wage in the agricultural sector has been a matter of concern.

Chakdaha CD Block had 220 fertiliser depots and 87 fair price shops in 2013–14.

In 2013–14, Chakdaha CD Block produced 3,181 tonnes of Aman paddy, the main winter crop from 1,297 hectares, 51,745 tonnes of Boro paddy (spring crop) from 12,934 hectares, 2,226 tonnes of Aus paddy (summer crop) from 811 hectares, 789 tonnes of wheat from 316 hectares, 121,652 tonnes of jute from 6,644 hectares, 1,155 tonnes of potatoes from 42 hectares and 301 tonnes of sugar cane from 3 hectares. It also produced pulses and oilseeds.

In 2013–14, the total area irrigated in Chakdaha CD Block was 1,745 hectares, out of which 102 hectares were irrigated by river lift irrigation and 643 hectares by deep tube wells.

=== Banking ===
In 2013–14, Chakdaha CD Block had offices of 7 commercial banks and 5 gramin banks.

== Transport ==
Chakdaha CD Block has 2 ferry services and 5 originating/ terminating bus services.

NH 12 (old number NH 34) passes through this block.

SH 1, running from Bangaon (in North 24 Parganas district) to Kulpi (in South 24 Parganas district) passes through this CD Block.

== Education ==
In 2013–14, Chakdaha CD Block had 222 primary schools with 16,609 students, 14 middle schools with 1,407 students, 9 high schools with 4,495 students and 39 higher secondary schools with 39,805 students. Chakdaha CD Block had 6 technical/ professional institutions with 754 students and 705 institutions for special and non-formal education with 11,316 students

In Chakdaha CD Block, amongst the 170 inhabited villages, 5 villages did not have any school, 62 had more than 1 primary school, 46 had at least 1 primary and one middle school and 30 had 1 middle school and 1 secondary school.

== Healthcare ==
In 2014, Chakdaha CD Block had 4 primary health centres and with total 10 beds and 16 doctors (excluding private bodies, but including Chakdaha municipal area). It had 40 family welfare subcentres. 210,669 patients were treated outdoor in the hospitals, health centres and subcentres of the CD Block.

Chaugacha Block Primary Health Centre, with 10 beds at Chaugacha, is the major government medical facility in the Chakdaha CD block. There are primary health centres at Moshra (with 6 beds) and Srinagar (with 10 beds), Sutargachhi (6 beds).

Chakdah State General Hospital at Chakdaha functions with 100 beds.,

Chakdaha CD Block is one of the areas of Nadia district where ground water is affected by high level of arsenic contamination. The WHO guideline for arsenic in drinking water is 10 mg/ litre, and the Indian Standard value is 50 mg/ litre. All the 17 blocks of Nadia district have arsenic contamination above this level. The maximum concentration in Chakdaha CD Block is 890 mg/litre.
