= Ambika Roy =

Indian politician

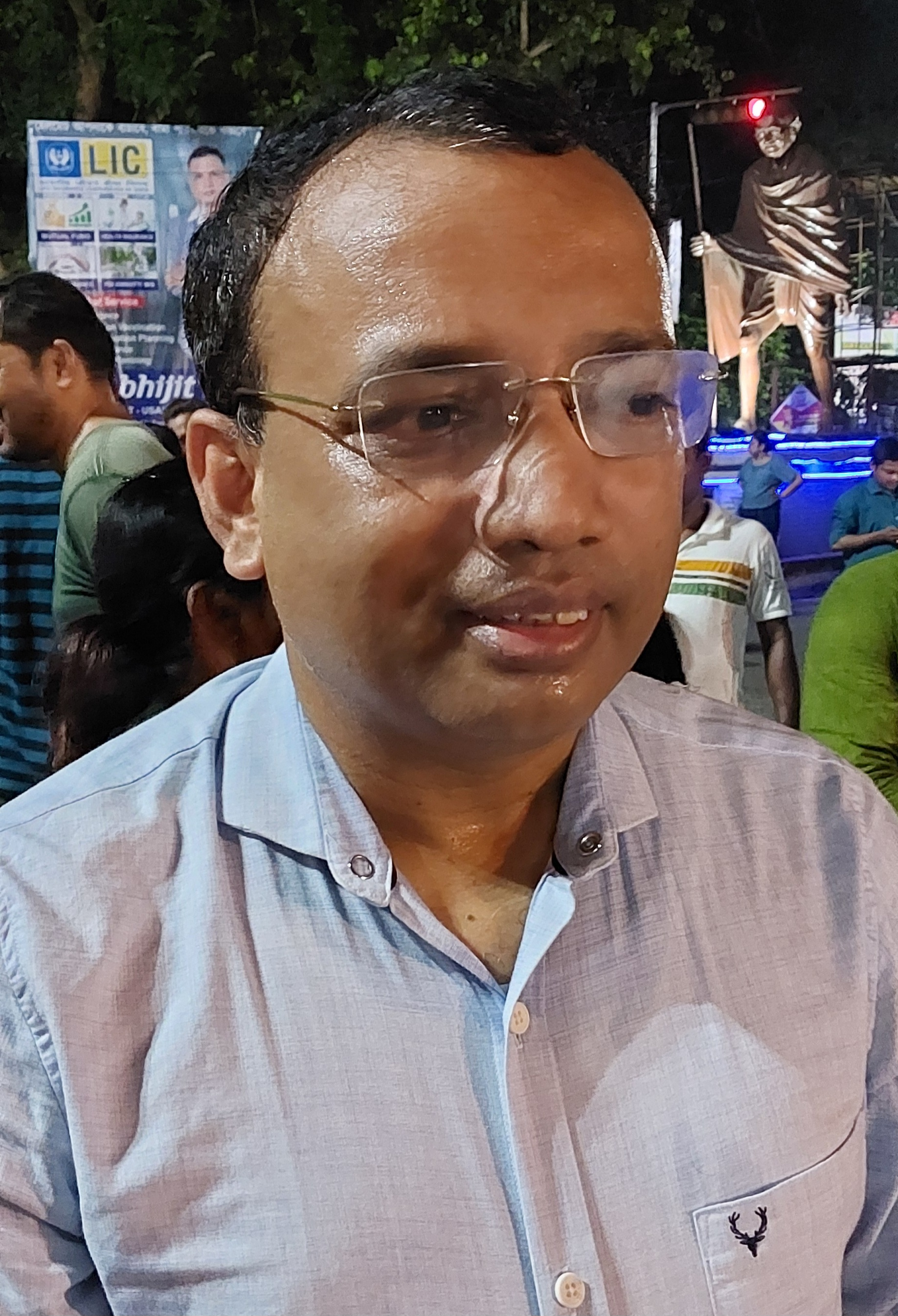

Member of the West Bengal Legislative Assembly
- In office 2 May 2021 – 4 May 2026
- Preceded by: Ramendra Nath Biswas
- Succeeded by: Anupam Biswas
- Constituency: Kalyani

Personal details
- Party: Bharatiya Janata Party
- Education: Calcutta University
- Profession: Politician, Advocate

Ambika Roy is an Indian politician from Bharatiya Janata Party. In May 2021, he was elected as the member of the West Bengal Legislative Assembly from Kalyani.

== Career ==
Roy hails from Nutan Birpur, Nakashipara, Nadia district. He is son of late Anil Chandra Roy and grandson of late Amulya Chandra Roy. He is junior of all 5 brothers and 2 sisters. He studied in Patikabari High School near Bethuadahri. Roy passed LL.B from University of Calcutta in 1996 and started practicing law in the Supreme Court of India. He worked as an activist of Bharatiya Janata Party in Kamrup, Assam and was a member of Nikhil Bharat Bangali Udbastu Sammanway Samiti. He was also sent to jail for the issue of Bengali refugees in Assam, and harassed by the radical student union group AASU. Later, he contested 2021 West Bengal Legislative Assembly election from Kalyani seat and won the seat on 2 May 2021.
