= Kulia Pat Temple =

Temple in West Bengal

Coordinates: 22°58′00″N 88°28′46″E

Kulia Pat Temple

Kulia Pat Temple, also known as Aparadh Bhanjan Mandir, is a Hindu temple associated with the Gaudiya Vaishnava tradition at Kulia in Nadia district, in the Indian state of West Bengal.

== History ==
The religious significance of Kulia is connected with Chaitanya Mahaprabhu's visit to the area. According to the Chaitanya Charitamrita, Chaitanya showed mercy to Devananda Pandita and forgave Gopala Chapala for an offence against the Vaishnava devotee Srivasa Thakura. It is also known as Aparadh Bhanjan Path refers to the religious concept of forgiveness for offences.
