= Anupam Biswas =

Indian politician

Member of the West Bengal Legislative Assembly
- Incumbent
- Assumed office 4 May 2026
- Preceded by: Ambika Roy
- Constituency: Kalyani

Personal details
- Party: Bharatiya Janata Party
- Profession: Politician

Anupam Biswas is an Indian politician, and a member of West Bengal Legislative Assembly, representing the Kalyani constituency. He resides in Kalyani and His father's name is Late Madhusudan Biswas. He is a member of Bharatiya Janata Party. In the 2026 West Bengal Legislative Assembly election, Biswas has won having polled 114469 votes from the seat, against TMC's Atindra Nath Mondal.
