= Belgharia, Nadia =

Belgharia
- Census Town
- Belgharia(CT)
- Location in West Bengal, India Belgharia (India)
- Coordinates: 23.1228°N 88.5549°E
- Country: India
- State: West Bengal
- District: Nadia
- Named after: Zamindars

Government
  - Type: Panchayet-

Area
  - Total: 1.6249 km^{2} (0.6274 sq mi)

Population (2011)
  - Total: 11,582
  - Density: 7,127.8/km^{2} (18,461/sq mi)

Languages
  - Official: Bengali, English
- Time zone: UTC+5:30 (IST)
- PIN: 741247
- Telephone/STD code: 03454
- Vehicle registration: WB 52 53 54
- Lok Sabha constituency: Ranaghat
- Vidhan Sabha constituency: Ranaghat Dakshin
- Website: nadia.gov.in

Belgharia is a census town in the Ranaghat II CD block in the Ranaghat subdivision of the Nadia district in the state of West Bengal, India.

== Geography ==
Cities and towns in Ranaghat subdivision of Nadia district
M: municipal town/ city/notified area, CT: census town, R: rural/ urban centre.
Owing to space constraints in the small map, the actual locations in a larger map may vary slightly

=== Location ===
Belgharia is located at 23.1228°N 88.5549°E.

=== Area overview ===
Nadia district is mostly alluvial plains lying to the east of Hooghly River, locally known as Bhagirathi. The alluvial plains are cut across by such distributaries as Jalangi, Churni and Ichhamati. With these rivers getting silted up, floods are a recurring feature. The Ranaghat subdivision has the Bhagirathi on the west, with Purba Bardhaman and Hooghly districts lying across the river. Topographically, Ranaghat subdivision is spread across the Krishnanagar-Santipur Plain, which occupies the central part of the district, and the Ranaghat-Chakdaha Plain, the low-lying area found in the south-eastern part of the district. The Churni separates the two plains. A portion of the east forms the boundary with Bangladesh. The lower portion of the east is covered by a portion of the North 24 Parganas district. The subdivision has achieved reasonably high urbanisation. 41.68% of the population lives in urban areas and 58.32% lives in rural areas.

Note: The map alongside presents some of the notable locations in the subdivision. All places marked in the map are linked in the larger full screen map. All the four subdivisions are presented with maps on the same scale – the size of the maps varies as per the area of the subdivision.

== Demographics ==
According to the 2011 Census of India, Belgharia had a total population of 11,582, of which 6,023 (52%) were males and 5,559 (48%) were females. Population in the age range 0–6 years was 434. The total number of literate persons in Belgharia was 6,552.

The following municipality and census towns were part of Chakdaha Urban Agglomeration in 2011 census: Chakdaha (M), Parbbatipur (CT), Gopalpur (CT), Belgharia (CT), Punglia (CT) and Lalpur (P) (CT).

== Infrastructure ==
According to the District Census Handbook 2011, Nadia, Belgharia covered an area of 1.6249 km^{2}. Among the civic amenities, it had 10 km roads, the protected water supply involved overhead tank, tubewell/ borewell, hand pump. It had 7,350 domestic electric connections. Among the medical facilities, it had 3 medicine shops. Among the educational facilities, it had 3 primary schools; other school facilities were at Payradanga 1 km away. It had 2 non-formal education centres (Sarva Siksha Abhiyan). Three important commodities it produced were paddy, vegetable, flour.
