= Lalpur, Nadia =

Lalpur
- Census Town
- Location in West Bengal, India Lalpur (India)
- Coordinates: 23.0803°N 88.5383°E
- Country: India
- State: West Bengal
- District: Nadia

Area
  - Total: 1.7902 km^{2} (0.6912 sq mi)

Population (2011)
  - Total: 8,356
  - Density: 4,668/km^{2} (12,090/sq mi)

Languages
  - Official: Bengali, English
- Time zone: UTC+5:30 (IST)
- PIN: 741222
- Telephone/STD code: 03454
- Lok Sabha constituency: Ranaghat
- Vidhan Sabha constituency: Chakdaha
- Website: nadia.gov.in

Lalpur is a census town in the Chakdaha CD block in the Kalyani subdivision of the Nadia district in the state of West Bengal, India.

== Geography ==
Cities and towns in Kalyani subdivision of Nadia district
M: municipal town/ city/notified area, CT: census town, R: rural/ urban centre.
Owing to space constraints in the small map, the actual locations in a larger map may vary slightly

=== Location ===
Lalpur is located at 23.0803°N 88.5383°E.

The map of Chakdaha CD block, in the District Census Handbook 2011, Nadia, shows Lalpur as being adjacent to Chakdaha on its eastern side.

=== Area overview ===
Nadia district is part of the large alluvial plain formed by the Ganges-Bhagirathi system. The Kalyani subdivision has the Bhagirathi/ Hooghly on the west. Topographically, Kalyani subdivision is a part of the Ranaghat-Chakdaha Plain, the low-lying area found in the south-eastern part of the district. The smallest subdivision in the district, area-wise, has the highest level of urbanisation in the district. 76.73% of the population lives in urban areas and 23.27% lives in the rural areas.

Note: The map alongside presents some of the notable locations in the subdivision. All places marked in the map are linked in the larger full screen map. All the four subdivisions are presented with maps on the same scale – the size of the maps vary as per the area of the subdivision.

== Demographics ==
According to the 2011 Census of India, Lalpur had a total population of 8,356, of which 4,241 (50%) were males and 4,295 (50%) were females. Population in the age range 0–6 years was 609. The total number of literate persons in Lalpur was 7,505 (94.68% of the population over 6 years).

The following municipality and census towns were part of Chakdaha Urban Agglomeration in 2011 census: Chakdaha (M), Parbbatipur (CT), Gopalpur (CT), Belgharia (CT), Punglia (CT) and Lalpur (P) (CT).

== Infrastructure ==
According to the District Census Handbook 2011, Nadia, Lalpur covered an area of 1.7902 km^{2}. Among the civic amenities, the protected water supply involved overhead tank, tubewell/ borewell, hand pump. It had 860 domestic electric connections. Among the medical facilities, it had 1 dispensary/ health centre, 14 medicine shops. Among the educational facilities it had 1 primary school, the nearest senior secondary school at Labpur 0.5 km away. Among the social, recreational and cultural facilities it had 1 cinema theatre. It had the branch office of 1 nationalised bank.

== Transport ==
Chakdaha railway station, located nearby, is on the Sealdah-Ranaghat line of the Kolkata Suburban Railway system.
