= Ramendra Nath Biswas =

Indian politician

Ramendra Nath Biswas is an Indian politician, former Member of Legislative Assembly From Kalyani (Vidhan Sabha constituency), Nadia in the Indian state of West Bengal.

== Political career ==
Biswas hails from Sreerampur, Chakdaha, Nadia district. His father's name is Nagendra Nath Biswas. He passed MA from Calcutta University in 1969 and worked as a teacher. Biswas completed his Ph.D. from the University of Kalyani in 1992. In 2001, he was defeated by CPI(M) candidate Asim Bala from Ranaghat East, presently Ranaghat Uttar Purba seat. He won Kalyani Assembly Constituency in 2011 West Bengal Legislative Assembly election. He was elected again in 2016 being an All India Trinamool Congress candidate and became the Member of West Bengal Legislative Assembly from Kalyani.
