= Punglia =

- Census Town
- Location in West Bengal, India Punglia (India)
- Coordinates: 23.0906°N 88.5447°E
- Country: India
- State: West Bengal
- District: Nadia

Area
  - Total: 1.4143 km^{2} (0.5461 sq mi)

Population (2011)
  - Total: 6,857
  - Density: 4,848/km^{2} (12,560/sq mi)

Languages
  - Official: Bengali, English
- Time zone: UTC+5:30 (IST)
- PIN: 741222
- Telephone/STD code: 03454
- Lok Sabha constituency: Ranaghat
- Vidhan Sabha constituency: Chakdaha
- Website: nadia.gov.in

Pumlia is a census town in the Chakdaha CD block in the Kalyani subdivision of the Nadia district in the state of West Bengal, India.

== Geography ==
Cities and towns in Kalyani subdivision of Nadia district
M: municipal town/ city/notified area, CT: census town, R: rural/ urban centre.
Owing to space constraints in the small map, the actual locations in a larger map may vary slightly

=== Location ===
Punglia is located at 23.0906°N 88.5447°E.

The map of Chakdaha CD block, in the District Census Handbook 2011, Nadia, shows Punglia and Lalpur as being adjacent to Chakdaha on its eastern side.

=== Area overview ===
Nadia district is part of the large alluvial plain formed by the Ganges-Bhagirathi system. The Kalyani subdivision has the Bhagirathi/ Hooghly on the west. Topographically, Kalyani subdivision is a part of the Ranaghat-Chakdaha Plain, the low-lying area found in the south-eastern part of the district. The smallest subdivision in the district, area-wise, has the highest level of urbanisation in the district. 76.73% of the population lives in urban areas and 23.27% lives in the rural areas.

Note: The map alongside presents some of the notable locations in the subdivision. All places marked in the map are linked in the larger full screen map. All the four subdivisions are presented with maps on the same scale – the size of the maps vary as per the area of the subdivision.

== Demographics ==
According to the 2011 Census of India, Punglia had a total population of 6,857, of which 3,461 (50%) were males and 3,396 (50%) were females. Population in the age range 0–6 years was 625. The total number of literate persons in Punglia was 5,625 (84.48% of the population over 6 years).

The following municipality and census towns were part of Chakdaha Urban Agglomeration in 2011 census: Chakdaha (M), Parbbatipur (CT), Gopalpur (CT), Belgharia (CT), Punglia (CT) and Lalpur (P) (CT).

== Infrastructure ==
According to the District Census Handbook 2011, Nadia, Punglia covered an area of 1.4143 km^{2}. Among the civic amenities, the protected water supply involved overhead tank, tubewell/ borewell, hand pump. It had 661 domestic electric connections. Among the medical facilities, it had 6 medicine shops. Among the educational facilities it had 3 primary schools, other school facilities at Kamalpur 1 km away.

The well known and established in the region Satish Chandra Memorial School falls under this area. The Chakdaha Choumatha (4-way intersection) is situated here. The Tatla II Panchayat, a major panchayat in the area, is also situated here.

== Transport ==
Chakdaha railway station, located nearby, is on the Sealdah-Ranaghat line of the Kolkata Suburban Railway system.
