= Kalyani Assembly constituency =

Kalyani
- Constituency No. 92 for the West Bengal Legislative Assembly
- Interactive Map Outlining Kalyani Assembly Constituency

Constituency details
- Country: India
- Region: East India
- State: West Bengal
- District: Nadia
- Lok Sabha constituency: Bangaon
- Established: 2011
- Total electors: 2,57,683
- Reservation: SC

Member of Legislative Assembly
- 18th West Bengal Legislative Assembly
- Incumbent Anupam Biswas
- Party: BJP
- Elected year: 2026
- Preceded by: Ambika Roy

Most Successful parties from Kalyani assembly
1. All India Trinamool Congress (2 time) (50.0%)
2. Bharatiya Janata Party (2 times) (50.0%)

Kalyani Assembly constituency is an assembly constituency in Nadia district in the Indian state of West Bengal. It is reserved for scheduled castes.

== Overview ==
As per orders of the Delimitation Commission, No. 92 Kalyani Assembly constituency (SC) is composed of the following: Kalyani municipality, Gayespur municipality and Chanduria II, Kanchrapara, Madanpur I, Madanpur II, Saguna, Sarati and Simurali gram panchayats of Kalyani community development block.

Kalyani Assembly constituency is a part of Bangaon Lok Sabha constituency.

== Members of the Legislative Assembly ==
Election	Member	Party
Kalyani
2011	Ramendra Nath Biswas	Trinamool Congress
2016	Ramendra Nath Biswas	Trinamool Congress
2021	Ambika Roy	Bharatiya Janata Party
2026	Anupam Biswas	Bharatiya Janata Party

== Election results ==
Vote share of Winning Candidates
Year	Percent
2026	53.12%
2021	44.04%
2016	50.47%
2011	51.55%

=== 2026 ===
2026 West Bengal Legislative Assembly election: Kalyani
Party	Candidate	Votes	%	±%
BJP	Anupam Biswas	114,469	53.12	▲9.08
AITC	Dr. Atindra Nath Mondal	79,677	36.97	▼6.06
CPI(M)	Sabuj Das	15,037	6.98	▼3.08
NOTA	None of the above	1,939	0.9	▼0.27
Majority		34,792	16.15	▲15.14
Turnout		215,506	93.32	▲7.81
BJP hold		Swing		

=== 2021 ===
2021 West Bengal Legislative Assembly election: Kalyani
Party	Candidate	Votes	%	±%
BJP	Ambika Roy	97,026	44.04	▲35.76
AITC	Aniruddha Biswas	94,820	43.03	▼7.44
CPI(M)	Sabuj Das	22,165	10.06	▼26.67
NOTA	None of the above	2,577	1.17	
Majority		2,206	1.01	
Turnout		220,338	85.51	
BJP gain from AITC		Swing		

=== 2016 ===
2016 West Bengal Legislative Assembly election: Kalyani
Party	Candidate	Votes	%	±%
AITC	Ramendra Nath Biswas	95,795	50.47	▼1.08
CPI(M)	Alokesh Das	69,700	36.73	▼6.06
BJP	Ranajit Kumar Biswas	15,710	8.28	▲5.78
NOTA	None of the above	2,851	1.5	
SS	Biplab Majumdar	2,355	1.24	New
BSP	Tushar Kanti Biswas	2,319	1.22	▼0.28
PDS	Samaresh Biswas	1,058	0.56	▼1.11
Majority		26,095	13.74	▲4.98
Turnout		1,89,788	81.75	▼8.36
AITC hold		Swing		

=== 2011 ===
In the 2011 election, Ramendra Nath Biswas of the Trinamool Congress defeated his nearest rival Jyotsna Sikdar of CPI(M).

West Bengal assembly elections, 2011: Kalyani (SC) constituency
Party	Candidate	Votes	%	±%
AITC	Ramendra Nath Biswas	92,322	51.55	New entry
CPI(M)	Jyotsna Sikdar	76,632	42.79	New entry
BJP	Dipali Bharati	4,478	2.5	New entry
PDS	Mithu Podder	2,995	1.67	New entry
BSP	Pranita Roy	2,681	1.5	New entry
Majority		15,690	8.76	▲8.76
Turnout		1,79,108	90.11	
AITC win (new seat)				
