= Birohi =

- Village
- Location in Uttar Pradesh, India Birohi (India)
- Coordinates: 25°9′29″N 82°25′39″E
- Country: India
- State: Uttar Pradesh
- District: Mirzapur

Population (2001)
  - Total: 3,952

Language
  - Official: Hindi
  - Additional official: Urdu
- Time zone: UTC+5:30 (IST)
- PIN: 231303
- Telephone code: 05442
- Vehicle registration: UP-63
- Sex ratio: 52:48 ♂/♀
- Website: up.gov.in

Birohi is a village in Chhanvey Mandal, Mirzapur District, Uttar Pradesh State. Birohi is located 5 km distance from its Mandal Main Town Chhanvey. Birohi is 13.1 km far from its District Main City Mirzapur. It is 240 km far from its State Main City Lucknow.

== Demographics ==
As of 2001 India census, Itahara Uparwar had a population of 3,952. Males constitute 52% (2066) of the population and females 48% (1886).
