= Shimurali =

Suburban area in Nadia district, West Bengal, India

- Census town
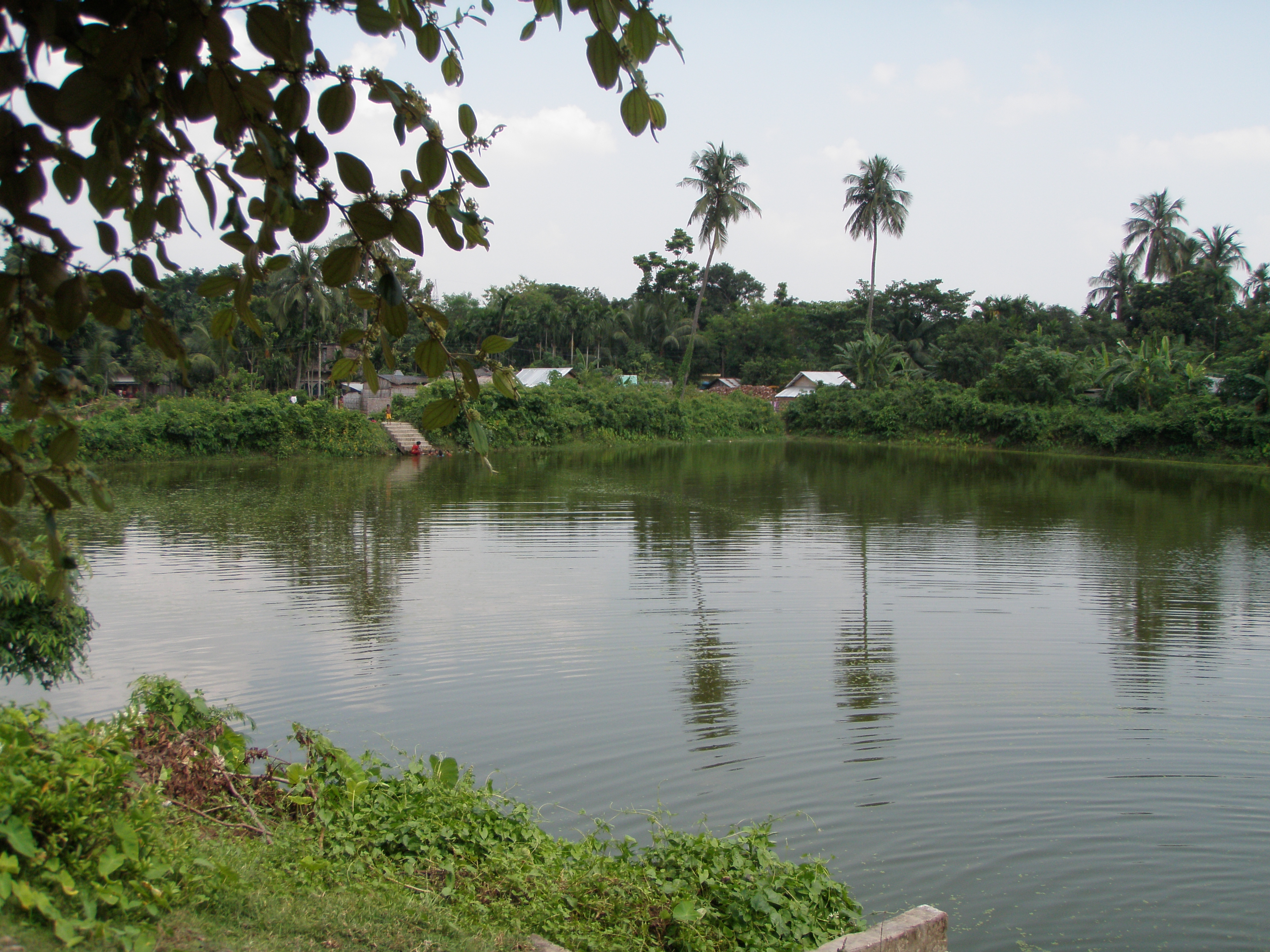
- Manosapota village
- Nickname: SMX
- Location in West Bengal, India Shimurali (India)
- Coordinates: 23.041327°N 88.510491°E
- Country: India
- State: West Bengal
- District: Nadia

Government
  - Body: Panchayat(s)

Area
  - Total: 1.5255 km^{2} (0.5890 sq mi)
- Elevation: 18 m (59 ft)

Population (2011)
  - Total: 17,819
  - Density: 127/km^{2} (330/sq mi)

Languages
  - Official: Bengali, English
- Time zone: UTC+5:30 (IST)
- PIN: 741248
- Vehicle registration: WB
- Lok Sabha constituency: Ranaghat (Lok Sabha constituency) & Bangaon (Lok Sabha constituency)
- Vidhan Sabha constituency: Kalyani
- Website: nadia.gov.in

Shimurali (often spelled 'Simurali') is a census town in Chakdaha CD block in the Kalyani subdivision of the Nadia district in the state of West Bengal, India.

== History ==
Shimurali is a culturally diverse place. In the past, it was best known for its river port, which fell under the Calcutta Port Trust Corporation (C.P.T.), a British port trust.

== Geography ==
Cities and towns in Kalyani subdivision of Nadia district
M: municipal town/ city/notified area, CT: census town, R: rural/ urban centre.
Owing to space constraints in the small map, the actual locations in a larger map may vary slightly

=== Location ===
Shimurali is located at 23.041327°N 88.510491°E.

=== Area overview ===
Nadia district is part of the large alluvial plain formed by the Ganges-Bhagirathi system. The Kalyani subdivision has the Bhagirathi/ Hooghly on the west. Topographically, Kalyani subdivision is a part of the Ranaghat-Chakdaha Plain, the low-lying area found in the south-eastern part of the district. The smallest subdivision in the district, area-wise, has the highest level of urbanisation in the district. 76.73% of the population lives in urban areas and 23.27% lives in the rural areas.

Note: The map alongside presents some of the notable locations in the subdivision. All places marked in the map are linked in the larger full screen map. All the four subdivisions are presented with maps on the same scale – the size of the maps vary as per the area of the subdivision.

== Demographics ==
According to the 2011 Census of India, Shimurali had a total population of 5,027, of which 2,509 (50%) were males and 2,518 (50%) were females. The population in the age range of 0–6 years was 401. The total number of literate persons in Shimurali was 4,233 (91.50% of the population over six years).

== Infrastructure ==
According to the District Census Handbook 2011, Nadia, Simurali covered an area of 1.5255 km^{2}. Among the civic amenities, the protected water supply involved overhead tank, tubewell/ borewell, hand pump. It had 508 domestic electric connections. Among the medical facilities it had 3 medicine shops. Among the educational facilities it had 2 primary schools, 3 middle schools, 3 secondary schools, 2 senior secondary schools.

== Transport ==
Simurali railway station is 58 km from Sealdah station of Kolkata.

National Highway 12 (old no. NH 34) connects the town to Kolkata.

== Education ==
Shimurali is known for the Shimurali Sachinandan College of Education, which is part of the University of Kalyani. There are many public primary schools in the area, as well as private English medium schools. Some Bengali medium schools include:

- Rautari High School for Boys (est. 1964)
- Rautari High School for Girls
- Shikarpur Vivekananda High School (est. 1967)
- Shikarpur Vivekananda High School for Girls
- Shimurali Upendra Bidyabhaban for Boys (est. 1946)
- Shimurali Upendra Bidyabhaban for Girls

== Gallery ==
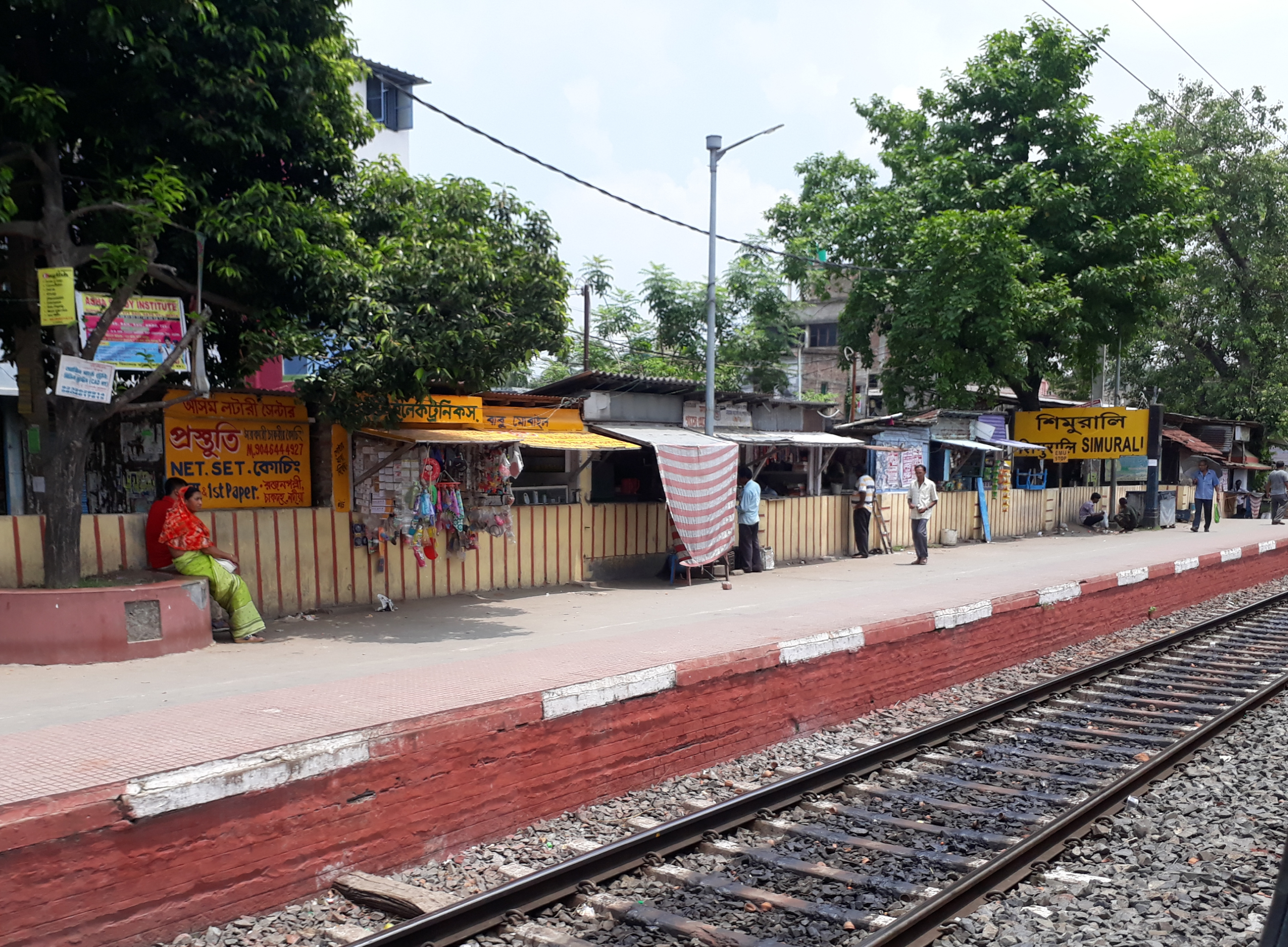
Simurali railway station

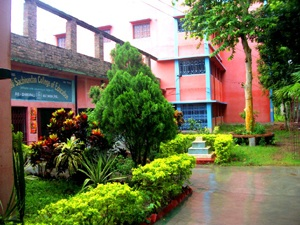
Shimurali Sachinandan College of Education

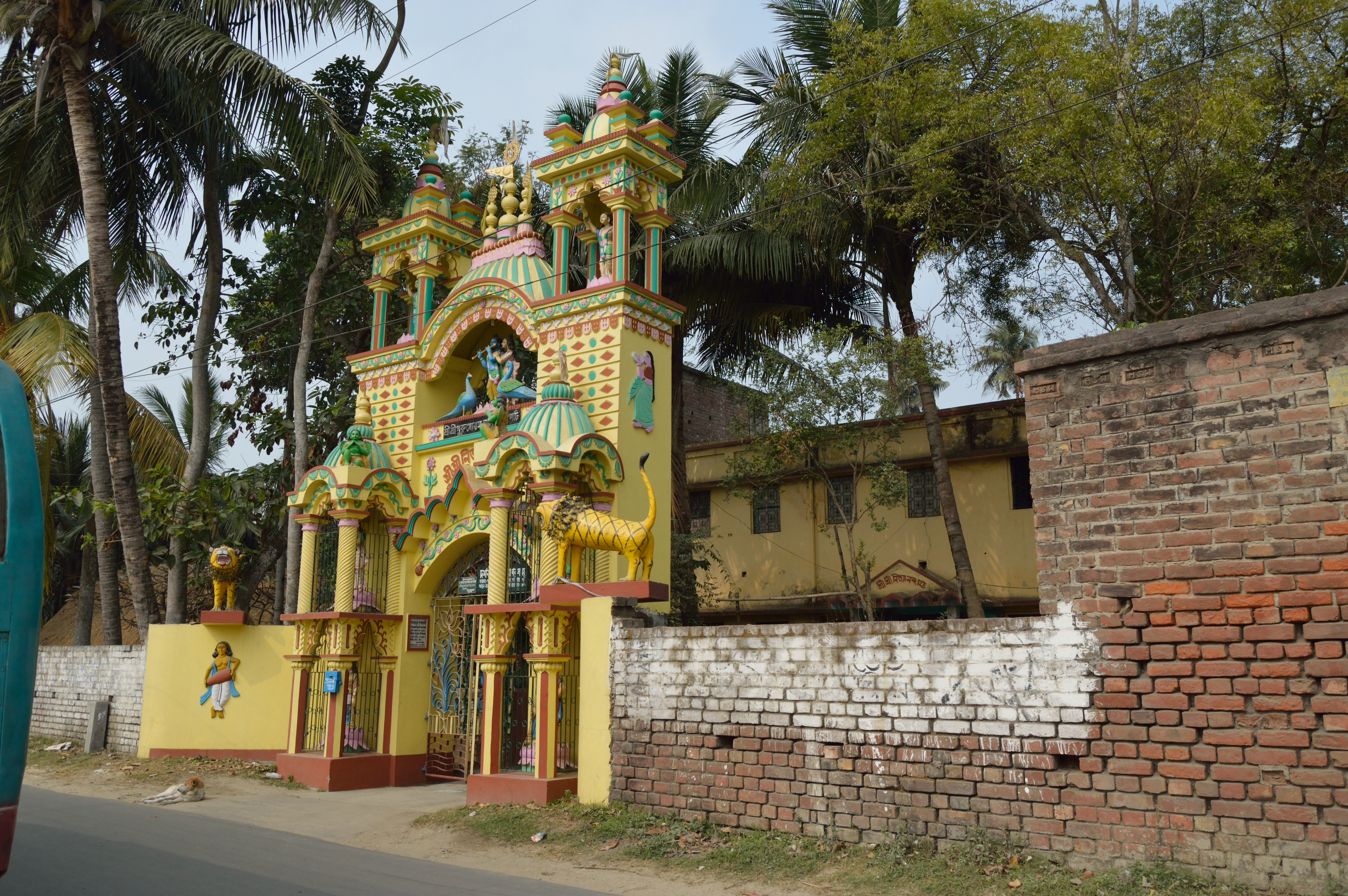
Nityananda Matha

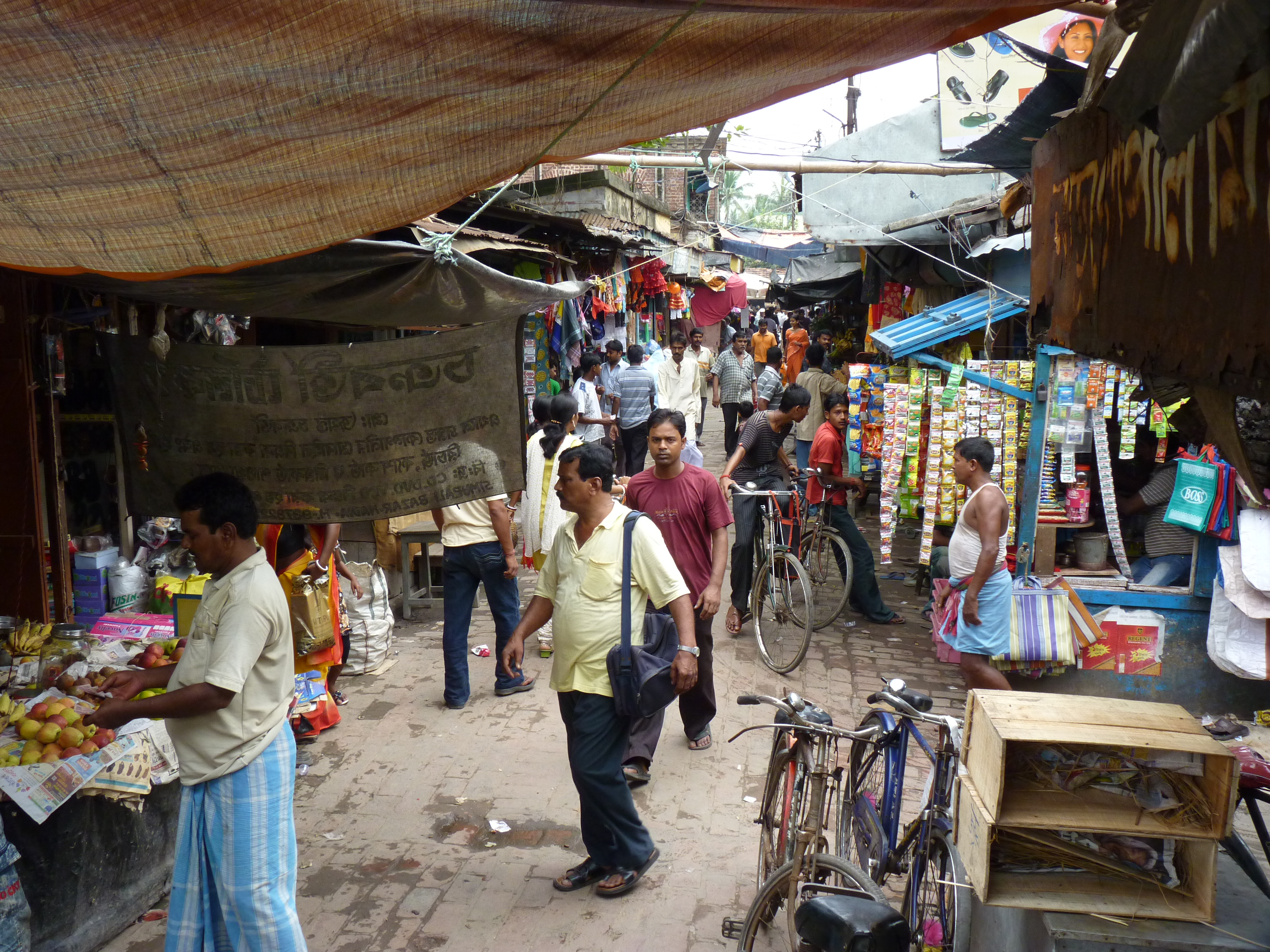
Shimurali Bazaar

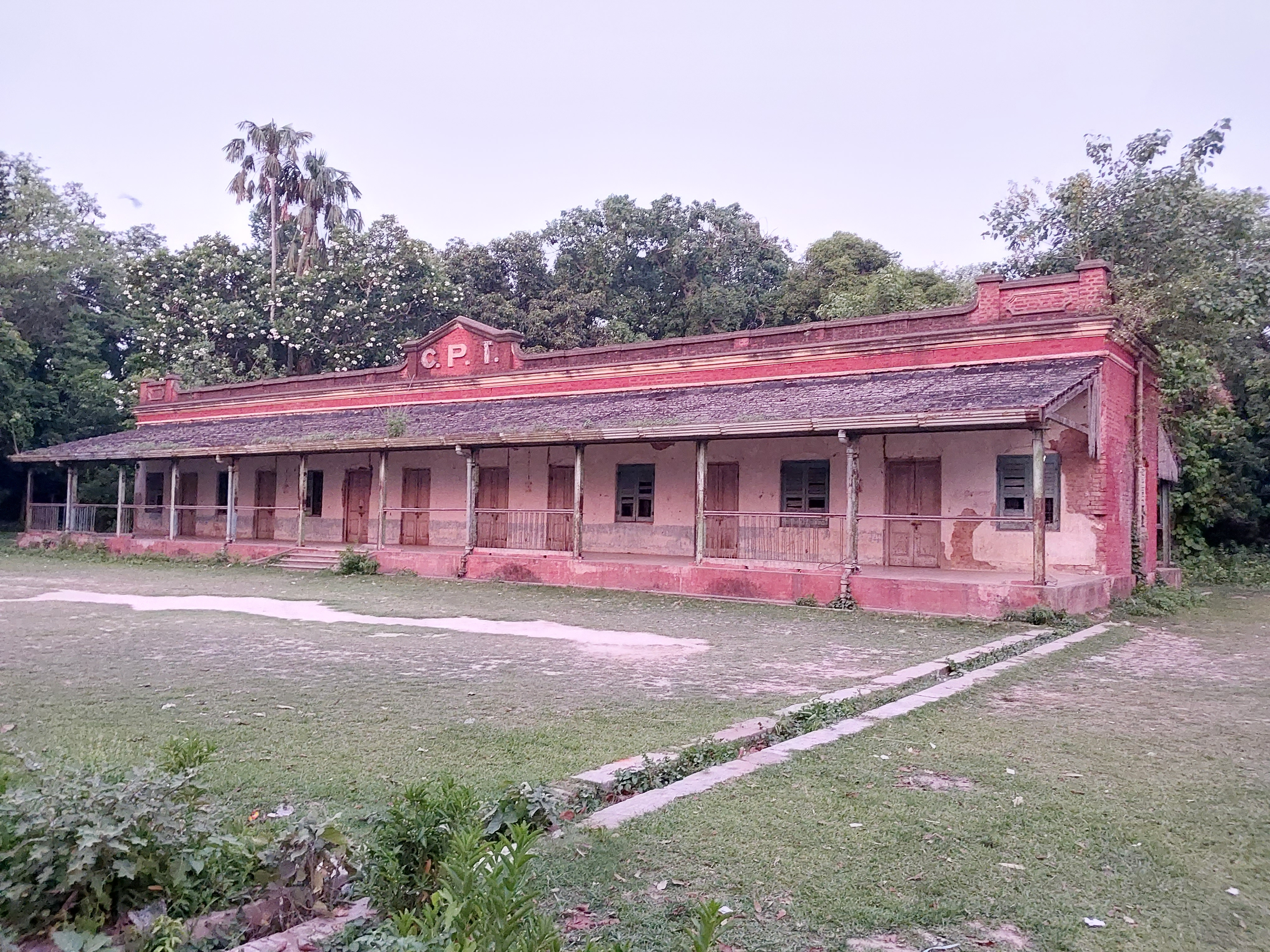
Calcutta Port Trust building at Shimurali

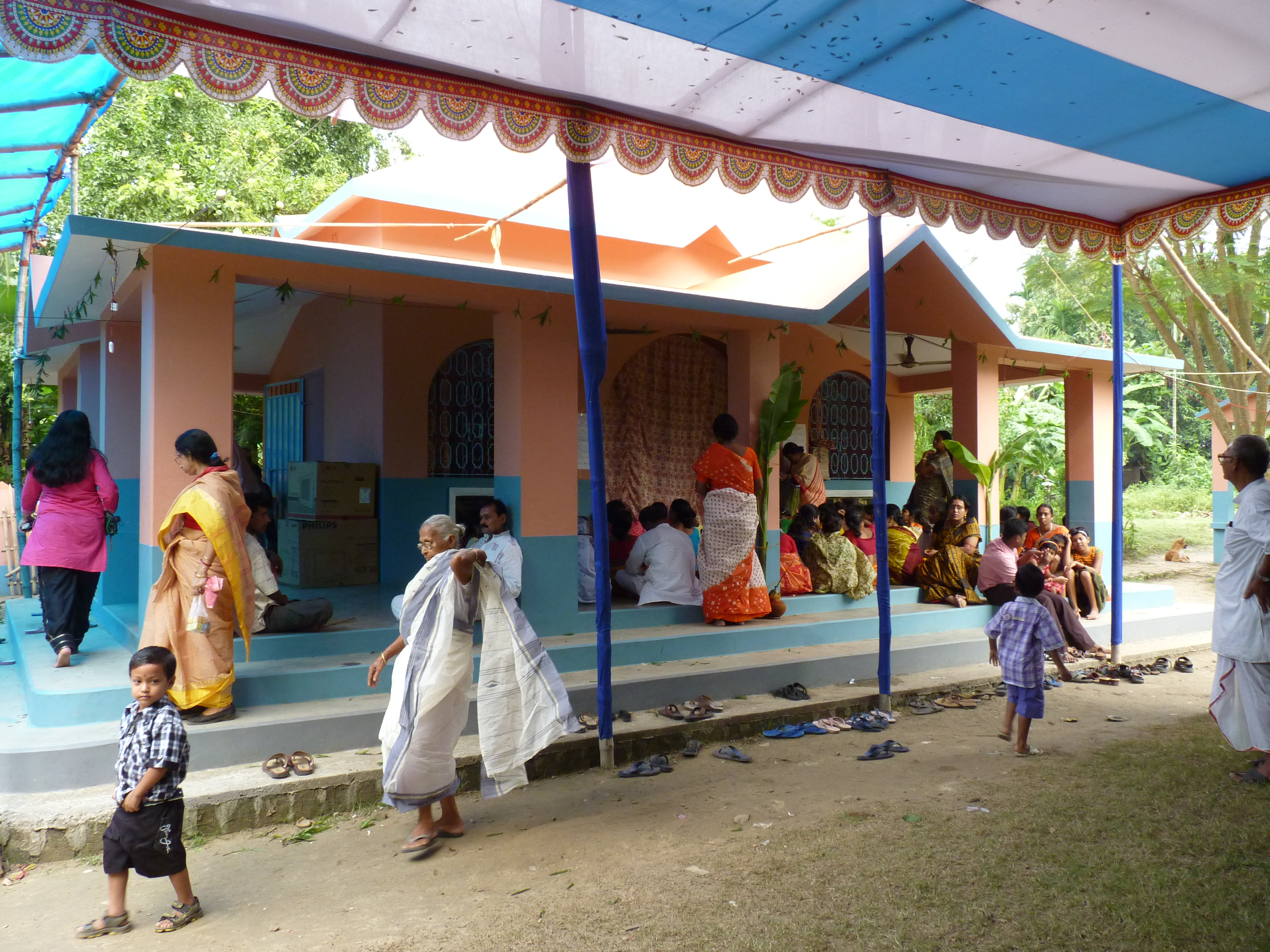
Burimatala temple
