= Saguna, Nadia =

Saguna
- Census Town
- Location in West Bengal, India Saguna (India)
- Coordinates: 22.9924°N 88.4912°E
- Country: India
- State: West Bengal
- District: Nadia

Government
  - Type: Saguna Panchayat & Kalyani BDO
  - Body: Saguna Panchayat & Kalyani BDO

Area
  - Total: 4.9858 km^{2} (1.9250 sq mi)

Population (2011)
  - Total: 14,995
  - Density: 3,007.5/km^{2} (7,789.5/sq mi)

Languages
  - Official: Bengali, English
- Time zone: UTC+5:30 (IST)
- PIN: 741245
- Telephone/STD code: +91 33
- Vehicle registration: WB-90 & WB-89
- Lok Sabha constituency: Bangaon
- Vidhan Sabha constituency: Kalyani
- Website: nadia.gov.in

Saguna is a census town in the Kalyani community Development Block in the Kalyani subdivision of the Nadia district in the state of West Bengal, India. It is a part of the area covered by Kolkata Metropolitan Development Authority (KMDA).

== Geography ==
Cities and towns in Kalyani subdivision of Nadia district
M: municipal town/ city/notified area, CT: census town, R: rural/ urban centre.
Owing to space constraints in the small map, the actual locations in a larger map may vary slightly

=== Location ===
Saguna is located at 22.9924°N 88.4912°E.

According to the map of Kalyani Block Consists of 7 Gram Panchayat's, viz. Saguna, Madanpur - 1, Madanpur - 2, Chanduria - 2, Simurali, Kanchrapara, Sarati

Saguna Panchayat falls under Kalyani police station under Ranaghat Police District.

Saguna is a village that is shaped with road and fields.

=== Area overview ===
Nadia district is part of the large alluvial plain formed by the Ganges-Bhagirathi system. The Kalyani subdivision has the Bhagirathi/ Hooghly on the west. Topographically, Kalyani subdivision is a part of the Ranaghat-Chakdaha Plain, the low-lying area found in the south-eastern part of the district. The smallest subdivision in the district, area-wise, has the highest level of urbanisation in the district. 76.73% of the population lives in urban areas and 23.27% lives in the rural areas.

Note: The map alongside presents some of the notable locations in the subdivision. All places marked in the map are linked in the larger full screen map. All the four subdivisions are presented with maps on the same scale – the size of the maps vary as per the area of the subdivision.

== Demographics ==
According to the 2011 Census of India, Saguna had a total population of 14,995, of which 7,717 (51%) were males and 7,274 (49%) were females. Population in the age range 0–6 years was 1,266. The total number of literate persons in Saguna was 11,933 (86.92% of the population over 6 years). There is also an ongoing increase in the population of this area as the newly built All India Institute of Medical Sciences, Kalyani is built at Basantapur village in the Saguna Panchayat in Kalyani built recently.

== Infrastructure ==
According to the District Census Handbook 2011, Nadia, Saguna covered an area of 4.9858 km^{2}. Among the civic amenities, the protected water supply involved overhead tank, tubewell/ borewell, hand pump. It had 1,389 domestic electric connections. Among the medical facilities it has multiple medicine shops. Among the educational facilities it had 8 primary schools, 1 senior secondary school (Lichutala Vivekananda Adarsha Vidyalaya). It has branch offices of 1 nationalized bank and 1 cooperative bank.

There is also a All India Institute of Medical Sciences, Kalyani (AIIMS Kalyani) at Basantapur village in the Saguna Panchayat in Kalyani built recently.

== Transport ==
Madanpur railway station & Kalyani railway station located nearby, is situated on the Sealdah-Ranaghat Line of the Kolkata Suburban Railway. Auto-Rickshaws are available for transport as well as Toto Rickshaws.
