= Gayespur =

Gayeshpur
- City
- Location in West Bengal, India Gayeshpur (India)
- Coordinates: 22.9586°N 88.4954°E
- Country: India
- State: West Bengal
- Division: Presidency
- District: Nadia

Government
  - Type: Municipality
  - Body: Gayeshpur Municipality

Area
  - Total: 30.00 km^{2} (11.58 sq mi)

Population (2011)
  - Total: 58,998
  - Density: 1,967/km^{2} (5,093/sq mi)

Languages
  - Official: Bengali, English
- Time zone: UTC+5:30 (IST)
- PIN: 741234
- Telephone code: +91 33
- ISO 3166 code: IN-WB
- Vehicle registration: WB
- Lok Sabha constituency: Bangaon
- Vidhan Sabha constituency: Kalyani
- Website: nadia.nic.in

Gayeshpur is a city and a municipality of Nadia district in the Indian state of West Bengal. It is a part of the area covered by Kolkata Metropolitan Development Authority (KMDA).

== Geography ==
Cities and towns in Kalyani subdivision of Nadia district
M: municipal town/ city/notified area, CT: census town, R: rural/ urban centre.
Owing to space constraints in the small map, the actual locations in a larger map may vary slightly

=== Location ===
Gayeshpur is located at 22.9586°N 88.4954°E.

=== Area overview ===
Nadia district is part of the large alluvial plain formed by the Ganges-Bhagirathi system. The Kalyani subdivision has the Bhagirathi/ Hooghly on the west. Topographically, Kalyani subdivision is a part of the Ranaghat-Chakdaha Plain, the low-lying area found in the south-eastern part of the district. The smallest subdivision in the district, area-wise, has the highest level of urbanisation in the district. 76.73% of the population lives in urban areas and 23.27% lives in the rural areas.

Note: The map alongside presents some of the notable locations in the subdivision. All places marked in the map are linked in the larger full screen map. All the four subdivisions are presented with maps on the same scale – the size of the maps vary as per the area of the subdivision.

== Demographics ==
As of 2011 India census, Gayeshpur had a population of 58,998. Males constitute 51% of the population and females 49%. Gayeshpur has an average literacy rate of 81%, higher than the national average of 59.5%: male literacy is 85%, and female literacy is 76%. In Gayeshpur, 8% of the population is under 6 years of age.

== Healthcare ==
Gandhi Memorial Hospital at Gayespur has 350 beds and Netaji Subhas Sanatorium at Gayespur has 925 beds.
