= Chakdaha =

- City
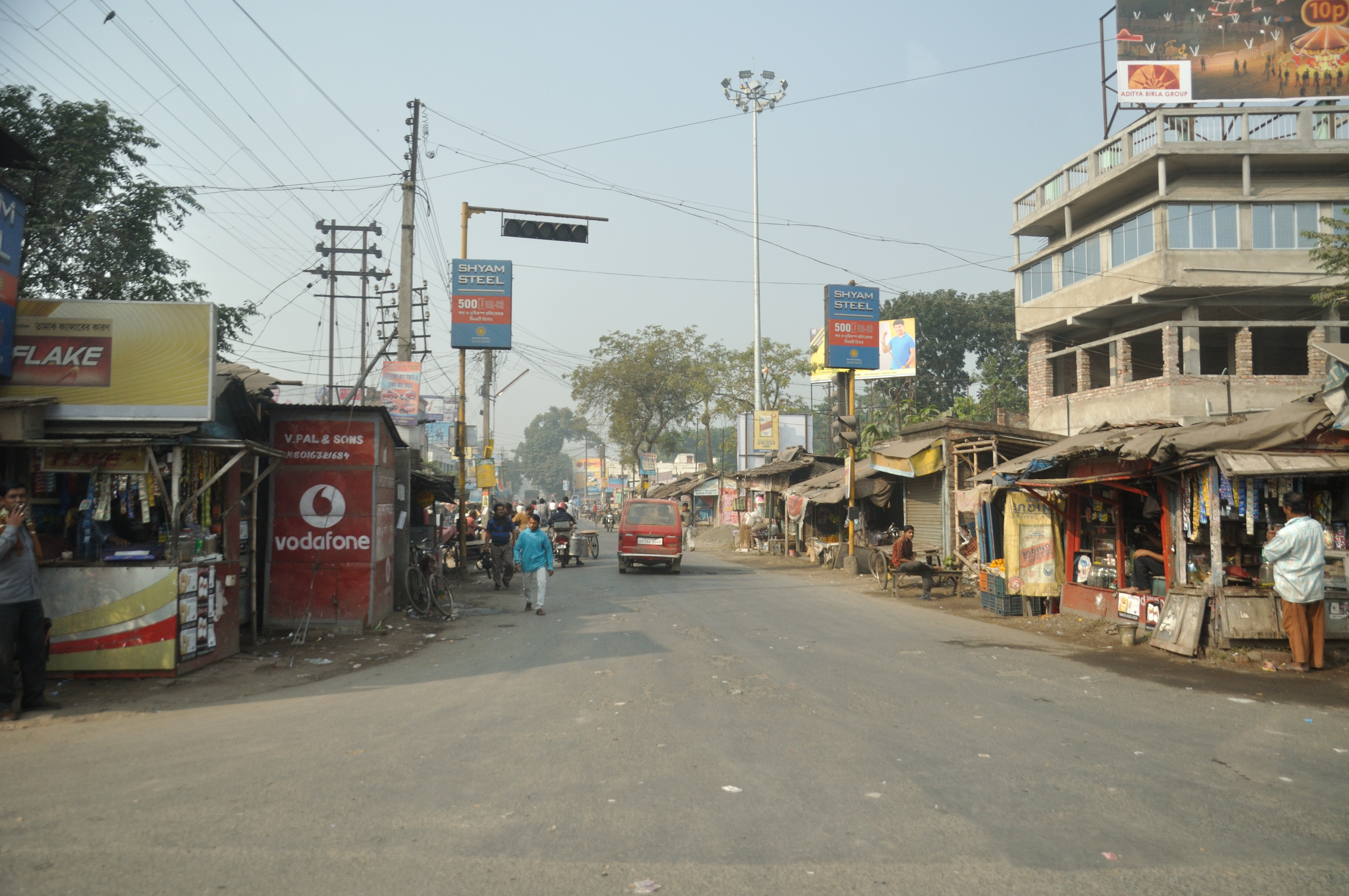
- Chakdaha Chowrasta

- Location in West Bengal, India Chakdaha (India)
- Coordinates: 23.08°N 88.52°E
- Country: India
- State: West Bengal
- District: Nadia

Government
  - Type: Municipality
  - Body: Chakdaha Municipality
  - MLA: Bankim Chandra Ghosh

Area
  - City: 15.36 km^{2} (5.93 sq mi)
- Elevation: 11 m (36 ft)

Population (2011)
  - City: 95,203
  - Density: 6,198/km^{2} (16,050/sq mi)
  - Metro: 132,855

Languages
  - Official: Bengali, English
- Time zone: UTC+5:30 (IST)
- PIN: 741222
- Lok Sabha constituency: Ranaghat
- Vidhan Sabha constituency: Chakdaha

Chakdaha is a city and a municipality in the Kalyani subdivision of the Nadia district, located in the state of West Bengal, India.

== Geography ==
Cities and towns in Kalyani subdivision of Nadia district
M: municipal town/ city/notified area, CT: census town, R: rural/ urban centre.
Owing to space constraints in the small map, the actual locations in a larger map may vary slightly

=== Location ===
Chakdaha is a prominent urban local body in the district of Nadia, one of the southern districts of West Bengal. Chakdaha's location is 23.08°N 88.52°E. It has an average elevation of 11 meters (36 feet) and is 62 km north of the state capital, Kolkata. It is on National Highway 12 (old number NH 34), an approximate 2-hour drive from Kolkata via the National Highway NH12. Regular public transport operates from Madhyamgram (near Kolkata) to Chakdaha, with low-cost buses running every 20 minutes during the day time.

=== Area overview ===
Nadia district is part of the large alluvial plain formed by the Ganges-Bhagirathi system. The Kalyani subdivision has the Bhagirathi/ Hooghly on the west. Topographically, Kalyani subdivision is a part of the Ranaghat-Chakdaha Plain, the low-lying area found in the south-eastern part of the district. The smallest subdivision in the district, area-wise, has the highest level of urbanisation in the district. 76.73% of the population lives in urban areas and 23.27% lives in the rural areas.

Note: The map alongside presents some of the notable locations in the subdivision. All places marked in the map are linked in the larger full screen map. All the four subdivisions are presented with maps on the same scale – the size of the maps vary as per the area of the subdivision.

== Police station ==
Chadaha's police station has jurisdiction over the Chakdah municipal town and the Chakdaha CD Block. The total area covered by the police station is 351.19 km^{2}, and the population covered is 458,834 (2001 census).

== Demographics ==
In the 2011 census, Chakdaha Urban Agglomeration had a population of 132,855, out of which 67,135 were male, and 65,720 were female. The population of children aged 0–5 was 9,829. The effective literacy rate for those aged 7 and above was 90.95 per cent with male literacy being 93.96% and female literacy being 87.88%.

Religion in Chakadaha Municipality
Religion	Percent
Hinduism	98.76%
Islam	0.87%
Christianity	0.05%
Other or not stated	0.32%

The following municipality and census towns were part of Chakdaha Urban Agglomeration in 2011 census: Chakdaha (M), Parbbatipur (CT), Gopalpur (CT), Belgharia (CT), Punglia (CT) and Lalpur (P) (CT).

== Education ==
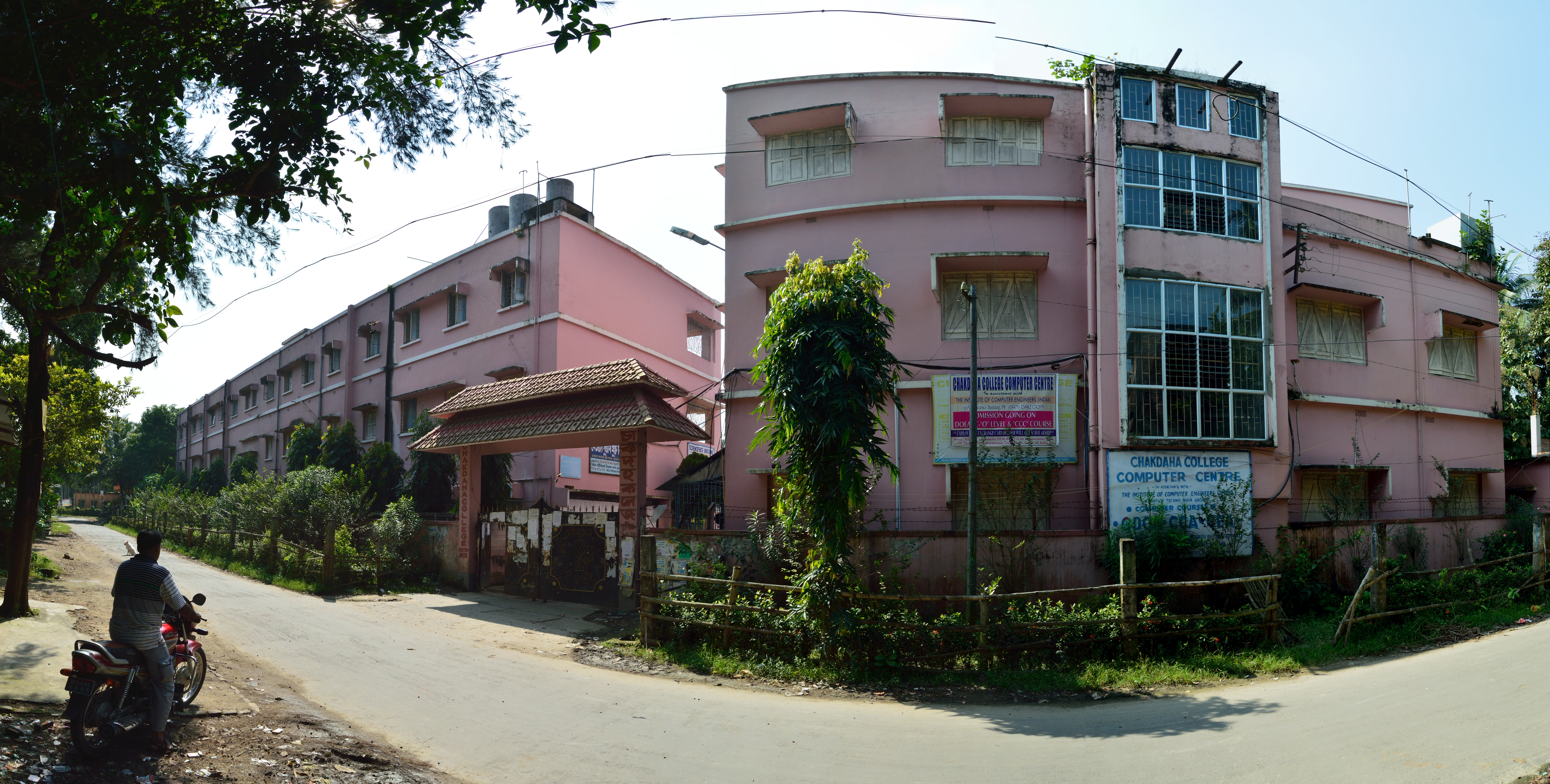
Chakdaha College

- Chakdaha College, established in 1979, is affiliated to the University of Kalyani.
- Chakdaha Ramlal Academy, established in 1907, is controlled by Department of School Education. It offers classes from 5 to 12 (HS). Presumably the Middle English School in the 19th century appeared as ‘Benimadhab Institution’, a High English School in 1907 to the west of Chakdaha Railway Station, in the land of Sinha family of Kanthalpuli. In the year 1910 the school got a vital change and named Chakdaha Ramlal Academy to commemorate the name of ‘Ramlal Singha’ who donated nearly ten thousand rupees.

== Healthcare ==
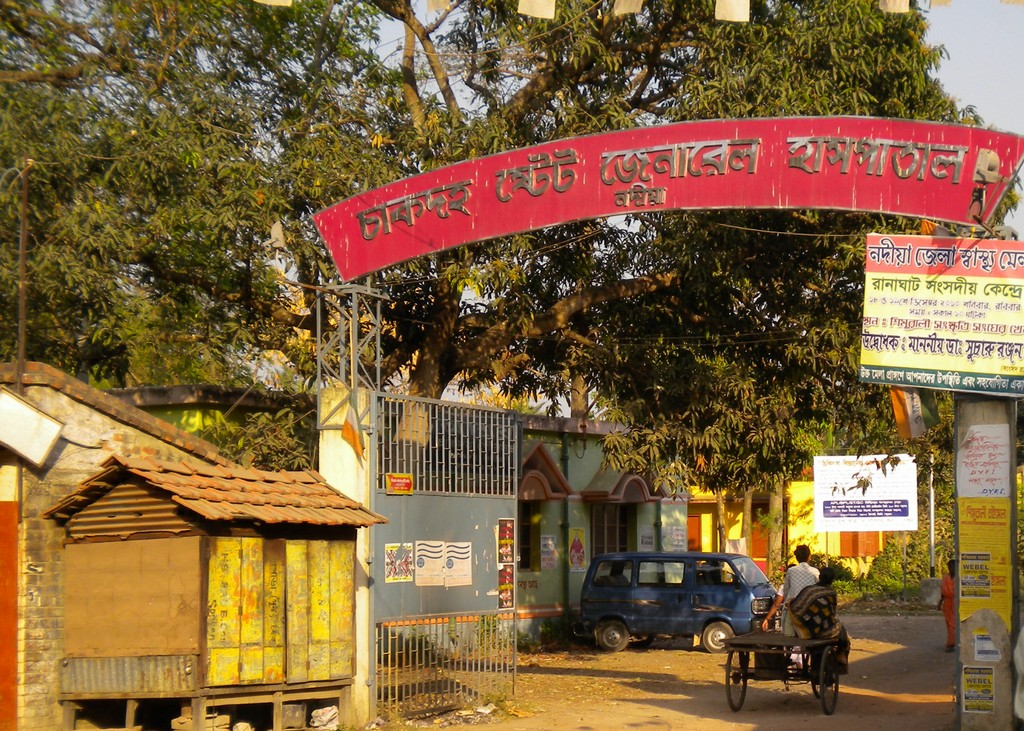
Chakdaha State General hospital

Chakdah State General Hospital is a 500 beds general hospital.

== Culture ==
=== Entertainment and sports ===
Cultural programs are mostly held in the Sampriti Manch and Chakdaha Pouro Mukto Mancha. Each winter, one large cultural program (better known as melas) takes place in Chakdaha. Since 2014 'Chakdaha Book Fair' has been established. Flower Exhibition is one of the popular events in this town.

== Notable people ==
- Jhulan Goswami, former Indian woman cricketer

== See also ==
- Chakdaha (Community development block)
