= Mainline =

Mainline, Main line, or Main Line may refer to:

== Transportation ==
=== Railway ===
- Main line (railway), the principal artery of a railway system
- Main line railway preservation, the practice of operating preserved trains on an operational railway network

==== Asia ====
Bangladesh

- Main line, MRT Line 2 of Dhaka Metro Rail

India

- Mumbai–Ahmedabad main line
- Chennai Central–Mysuru main line
- Gandhidham–Ahmedabad main line
- Howrah–Barddhaman main line
- Howrah–Chennai main line
- New Delhi–Howrah main line
- New Delhi – Chennai main line

Japan

- Arashiyama Main Line
- Chichibu Main Line
- Chikuhō Main Line
- Chūō Main Line
- Eiden Eizan Main Line
- Fukushima Rinkai Railway Main Line
- Hakodate Main Line
- Hankyū Kōbe Main Line
- Hankyu Kyoto Main Line
- Hankyu Takarazuka Main Line
- Hanshin Main Line
- Hidaka Main Line
- Hiroden Main Line
- Hōhi Main Line
- Hokuriku Main Line
- Kagoshima Main Line
- Kansai Main Line
- Keihan Main Line
- Keikyū Main Line
- Keisei Main Line
- Kisei Main Line
- Kyūdai Main Line
- Meitetsu Nagoya Main Line
- Mizushima Main Line
- Muroran Main Line
- Nagasaki Main Line
- Nankai Main Line
- Nayoro Main Line
- Nemuro Main Line
- Nippō Main Line
- Ohmi Railway Main Line
- Ōigawa Railway Ōigawa Main Line
- Osaka Monorail Main Line
- Ōu Main Line
- Rumoi Main Line
- San'in Main Line
- Sanyo Electric Railway Main Line
- San'yō Main Line
- Sekihoku Main Line
- Senmō Main Line
- Shin'etsu Main Line
- Sōbu Main Line
- Sōtetsu Main Line
- Sōya Main Line
- Takayama Main Line
- Tōhoku Main Line
- Tōkaidō Main Line
- Toyama Chihō Railway Main Line
- Toyohashi Railroad Azumada Main Line
- Uetsu Main Line

Korea

- Trans-Korean Main Line

Pakistan

- Karachi–Peshawar Line, also referred to as Main Line 1

Philippines

- PNR North Main Line
- PNR South Main Line

Sri Lanka

- Main Line (Sri Lanka)

Thailand

- Chiang Mai Main Line, between Bangkok and Chiang Mai
- Ubon Ratchathani Main Line, between Ban Phachi Junction and Ubon Ratchathani

Turkey

- Adana – Mersin Main Line

==== Europe ====
- Main Line for Europe

Finland

- Finnish Main Line, between Helsinki and Oulu

Germany

- Baden main line, between Baden and Constance

Sweden

- Northern Main Line, between Gävle or Storvik and Ånge
- Southern Main Line, between Malmö and Katrineholm
- Western Main Line, between Stockholm and Gothenburg

United Kingdom

- Brighton Main Line
- Caledonian main line
- Chatham Main Line
- Chiltern Main Line
- Cornish Main Line
- East Coast Main Line
- Great Central Main Line
- Great Eastern Main Line
- Great Western Main Line
- Highland Main Line
- Main Line Preservation Group, an organisation that eventually became the Great Central Railway heritage railway
- Mainline Freight, a defunct UK railfreight company
- Midland Main Line
  - Midland Mainline (train operating company), a defunct UK train-operating company
- North British Railway Main Line
- Penrhyn Main Line class, three narrow-gauge steam locomotives built for the Penrhyn Quarry Railway
- South Eastern Main Line
- South Humberside Main Line, between Doncaster and Cleethorpes
- South Wales Main Line
- South West Main Line
- West Anglia Main Line
- West Coast Main Line
- Wessex Main Line

==== North America ====
United States

- Cape Main Line, in Cape Cod, Massachusetts
- IRT Manhattan Main Line, in New York City
- Main Line (Atlantic Coast Line Railroad), now the CSX A Line
- Main Line (Seaboard Air Line Railroad), now the CSX S Line
- Main Line (Columbus to Chicago), a Pennsylvania Railroad line in Ohio, Indiana, and Illinois
- Main Line (Columbus to Indianapolis via Bradford), a Pennsylvania Railroad line in Ohio
- Main Line (Pennsylvania Railroad), between Philadelphia and Pittsburgh, Pennsylvania
- Main Line (Long Island Rail Road), between Long Island City and Greenport, New York
- Main Line (New York to Hoffmans), a nickname for the CSX Hudson Subdivision
- Main Line (NJ Transit), formerly part of the Erie Railroad, between Hoboken and Suffern, New Jersey
- Main Line (Pittsburgh to St. Louis), a Pennsylvania Railroad line between Ohio and Illinois
- Main Line (Reading Company), the former Reading main line between Philadelphia and Pottsville, Pennsylvania
- Main Line of Mid-America, a nickname of the former Illinois Central Railroad
- Main Line Subdivision, owned by CSX Transportation in Kentucky and Tennessee
- Main Street Line (MATA Trolley), a streetcar line in Memphis, Tennessee
- Metropolitan main line, a former rapid transit line in Chicago, Illinois
- North Side main line, a rapid transit line in Chicago, Illinois
- Old Main Line Subdivision, between Relay (outside Baltimore) and Point of Rocks, Maryland
- Park Avenue main line, the former New York Central Railroad (now Metro-North Railroad) from Grand Central Terminal in Manhattan to Mott Haven Junction in the South Bronx
- Philadelphia Main Line
- Philadelphia to Harrisburg Main Line, part of the Pennsylvania Railroad Main Line now owned by Amtrak
- Philadelphia-to-Washington Main Line
- RF&P Subdivision, former Richmond, Fredericksburg, & Potomac (RF&P) Main Line
- SEPTA Main Line, between West Philadelphia and Lansdale, Pennsylvania
- South Side Main Line (Chicago Transit Authority), in Chicago, Illinois
- Washington to Atlanta Main Line, owned by Norfolk Southern Railway

==== Oceania ====
Australia

- Main Line railway, Queensland
- South Line, Tasmania, Australia, also called the Main Line
- Tasmanian Main Line Company, a privately owned railway that existed from 1872 to 1890

New Zealand

- Canterbury Interior Main Line, a proposed railway on the South Island

=== Other transport ===
- Mainline (aeronautics), an airline carrier's non-regional service
- Main Line of Public Works, a package of legislation establishing freight transport between Philadelphia and Pittsburgh
- A toll road system where all vehicles stop at various locations on the highway to pay a toll
- BCN Main Line (Birmingham Canal Navigations Main Line), a canal between Birmingham and Wolverhampton, England
- Ford Mainline, a car model
- South Yorkshire Transport, a large bus operator in South Yorkshire, England which was renamed "Mainline" in 1993

== Music ==
- McKenna Mendelson Mainline, a seminal Canadian blues band
- "Mainline", a song by KISS on their 1974 album Hotter Than Hell
- "Mainline", a 1979 disco song by Black Ivory
- Mainline, a 2014 album by Australian hip-hop collective One Day.

== Businesses ==
- Main Line Broadcasting, a defunct American media company
- Main Line Health, a not-for-profit health system in Philadelphia, Pennsylvania
- Mainline Corporation, former Australian construction company
- Mainline Railways, a model railway brand now owned by Bachmann

== Computing ==
- BitTorrent (software), nicknamed mainline by developers denoting its official origins
- Mainline Linux, the Git repository of Linus Torvalds
- Trunk or mainline, the primary branch of a software project

=== See also ===
- Fork (software development) – a software development edition that is not part of the "Mainline" version

== Other uses ==
- Main line, a primary variation in chess
- Main line (political) (Mainlinie), a historical and political boundary between Northern and Southern Germany, roughly following the River Main
- Mainline Drive-In, a drive-in theatre in Gepps Cross, South Australia
- Mainline Protestant, a group of Christian church denominations
- "Mainlining," a slang term for intravenous drug use
- Philadelphia Main Line, a collection of suburbs of Philadelphia, Pennsylvania

== See also ==
- Central line (disambiguation)
- Mainliner (disambiguation)
- Old Main Line (disambiguation)
- Trunkline (disambiguation)
