= OML =

OML may refer to:

- Old Main Line (disambiguation), various meanings in transportation
- Old Mutual, an international insurance company
- One More Light, an album by American musicians Linkin Park
- Order of Merit List, for the U.K. Order of Merit
- Outer mold line, an aeroshell's outer surface, mainly used in the context of aviation, such as in spacecraft boilerplates
- OML, the Indian Railways station code for Omalur Junction railway station, Salem, Tamil Nadu
- OML (computer format) (Outline Markup Language) is an XML format for outlines
