= North–South Corridor =

North–South Corridor may refer to:

== India ==
- North–South and East–West Corridor, a highway project in India
- North–South Corridor (Ahmedabad Metro), a rapid mass transit railway system
- North–South Corridor (West Bengal), a highway in Haldia Port to near Farrakka
- Blue Line (Kolkata Metro) or North–South Metro, a mass transit rail line

== Other countries ==
- International North–South Transport Corridor, a multi-mode freight transport network in Asia and Europe
- North–South Corridor, Adelaide, a road through Adelaide, South Australia
- North–South Corridor, Singapore, an expressway in Singapore
- North–South Corridor, a component of the Sha Tin to Central Link, a mass transit railway line in Hong Kong

== See also ==
- North–South line (disambiguation)
- North–South Expressway (disambiguation)
