= East West Corridor =

East West Corridor may refer to:

== Rail transport ==
- Aqua Line (Nagpur Metro), a rapid transit line in Maharashtra, India
- Blue Line (Lucknow Metro), a rapid transit line in Uttar Pradesh, India
- Green Line (Kolkata Metro), a rapid transit line in West Bengal, India
  - East–West Metro Tunnel, the tunnel section of Green Line
- Tuen Ma line, a commuter rail line in Hong Kong

== Road transport ==
- East–West Corridor, part of India's North–South and East–West Corridor highway project
- East–West Corridor, a set of three bus routes served by Miami-Dade Transit in Florida, United States

== Other ==
- East–West Corridor, a metropolitan area in Trinidad and Tobago

== See also ==
- East-West Industrial Corridor Highway, Arunachal Pradesh, India
- East–West line (disambiguation)
