= Central link =

Central link may refer to:

- Central Link, now known as the 1 Line, a light rail line running between the cities of Seattle and SeaTac, part of Sound Transit's Link light rail system
- North–South Expressway Central Link, the main expressway in Malaysia
- Sha Tin to Central Link, a heavy rail expansion project of the MTR in Hong Kong

== See also ==
- Central Artery, a section of freeway in downtown Boston, Massachusetts
- Central subway (disambiguation)
- Central line (disambiguation)
