= Center line =

Center line, centre line or centerline may refer to:

== Sports ==
- Center line, marked in red on an ice hockey rink
- Centre line (football), a set of positions on an Australian rules football field
- Centerline, a line that separates the service courts in pickleball

== Transportation ==
- Center line, a road surface marking
- Center line, a taxiway marking
- Center line, a runway marking
- CenterLine (OCTA), failed light-rail project in Orange County, California, U.S.
- Centerline (nautical), the dividing line between port and starboard sides of a ship or boat
- Centreline, a bus service in Manchester, England, later rebranded Metroshuttle

== Other uses ==
- Center Line, Michigan, a place in the United States
  - Center Line High School
- Centre-Line Party, former name of the Australian Democrats political party
- Centerline, an engineering drawing symbol stylized by an overlapping C and L (℄)
- Center line, one of the parts of a theatre

== See also ==
- Central line (disambiguation)
- ℄, an engineering drawing symbol for centerline
