= Ishwar Gupta Setu =

Bridge of West Bengal over the Ganges

Ishwar Gupta Setu Kalyani-Bansberia Bridge
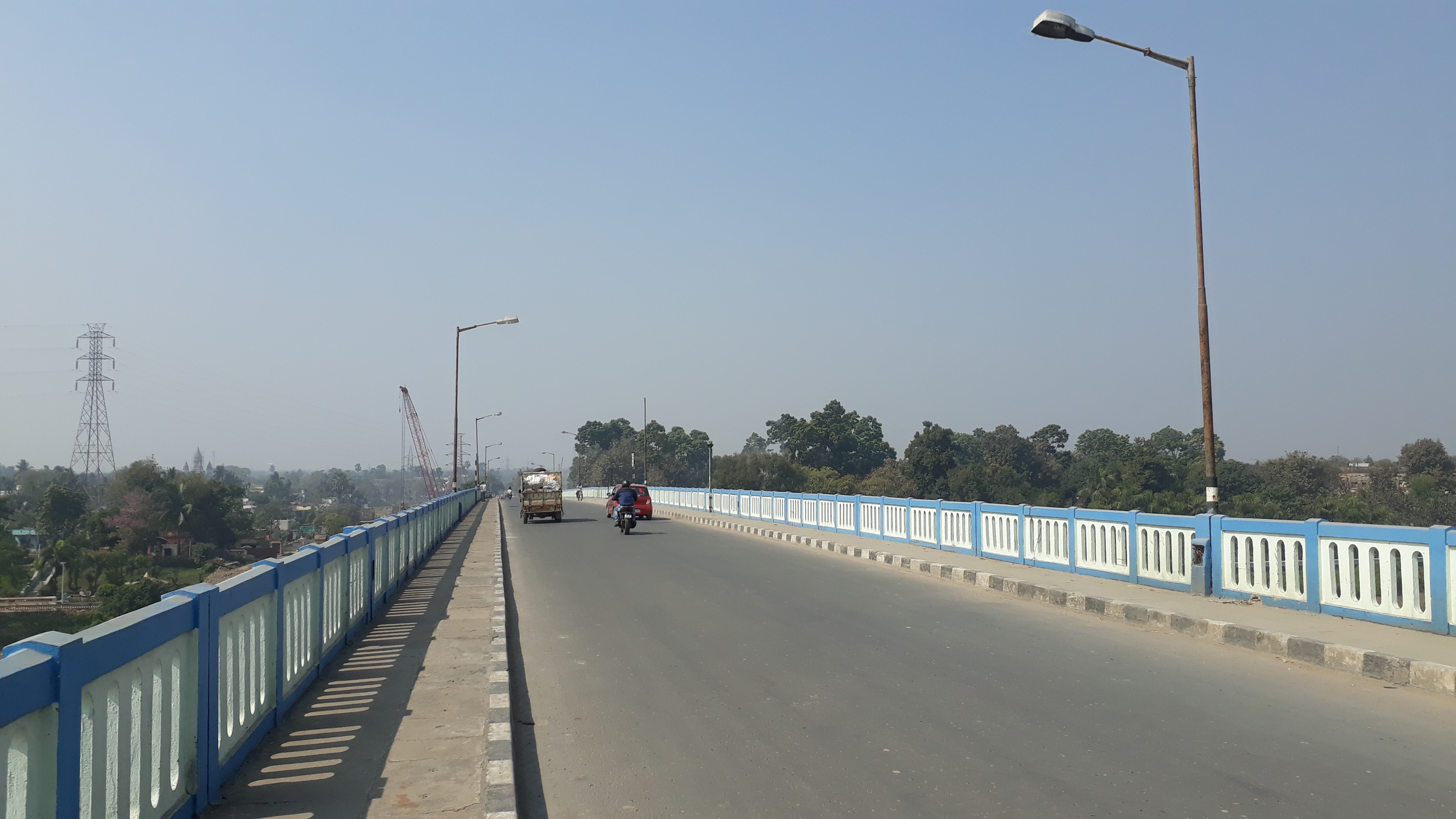
- Ishwar Gupta Setu in 2022
- Coordinates: 22°58′2″N 88°24′27″E
- Carries: Motor vehicles, pedestrians and bicycles
- Crosses: Hooghly River
- Locale: Bansberia, Hooghly, Kolkata Metropolitan Area, West Bengal, India
- Official name: First Iswar Gupta Setu
- Other name(s): Kalyani Bridge
- Named for: Ishwar Chandra Gupta
- Owner: PWD
- Maintained by: PWD (Roads) Pipulpati, Hooghly Division-II

Characteristics
- Design: Beam Bridge
- Material: Pre-Stressed Concrete
- Total length: 1,056.25 m (3,465.4 ft)

History
- Opened: 1989

Ishwar Gupta Setu (Bengali: ঈশ্বর গুপ্ত সেতু) is a 1,056.25 m (3,465.4 ft) long road bridge that crosses the Hooghly River in Bansberia, Hooghly and Kalyani, Nadia in West Bengal, India. The Kalyani Expressway crosses the bridge, connecting National Highway 12 with National Highway 19. It is named after the 19th‑century Bengali poet Ishwar Chandra Gupta. The original bridge is a Beam bridge, pre‑stressed concrete structure carrying a four‑lane, 10.5 m‑wide roadway over a 676 m span of the Hooghly River. Due to increased demand, a second parallel six‑lane extradosed cable‑stayed bridge with seven spans totaling 714 m and a 35 m‑wide deck is now under construction to enhance capacity and resilience.

== History ==
The Ishwar Gupta Setu was named after the famous poet Ishwar Chandra Gupta. This bridge was commissioned in 1978 and was built between 1981 and 1989 to reduce the traffic of Hooghly and Nadia district. On 6 October 1989, Jyoti Basu, the former Chief Minister of West Bengal, inaugurated the bridge in Kalyani. Due to damage to the existing bridge, a new Ishwar Gupta Setu is currently under construction by the West Bengal Highway Development Corporation.

== Structure and Specifications ==
The Ishwar Gupta Setu is a Beam Bridge, pre‑stressed concrete road bridge commissioned by the West Bengal Public Works Department and opened in 1989. Its main structure carries a four‑lane carriageway 10.5 m wide over the Hooghly River on a total bridge‑proper length of 676 m.

A parallel, extradosed cable‑stayed bridge, Second Ishwar Gupta Setu is under construction immediately adjacent, designed by COWI in collaboration with RITES and built by Larsen & Toubro. It will be six-lane with a span 714 m in seven spans (including a 120 m main span), carry a 35 m‑wide deck for six traffic lanes, and feature inclined extradosed pylons and stays to reduce deck thickness and enhance aesthetic slenderness.

== Gallery ==
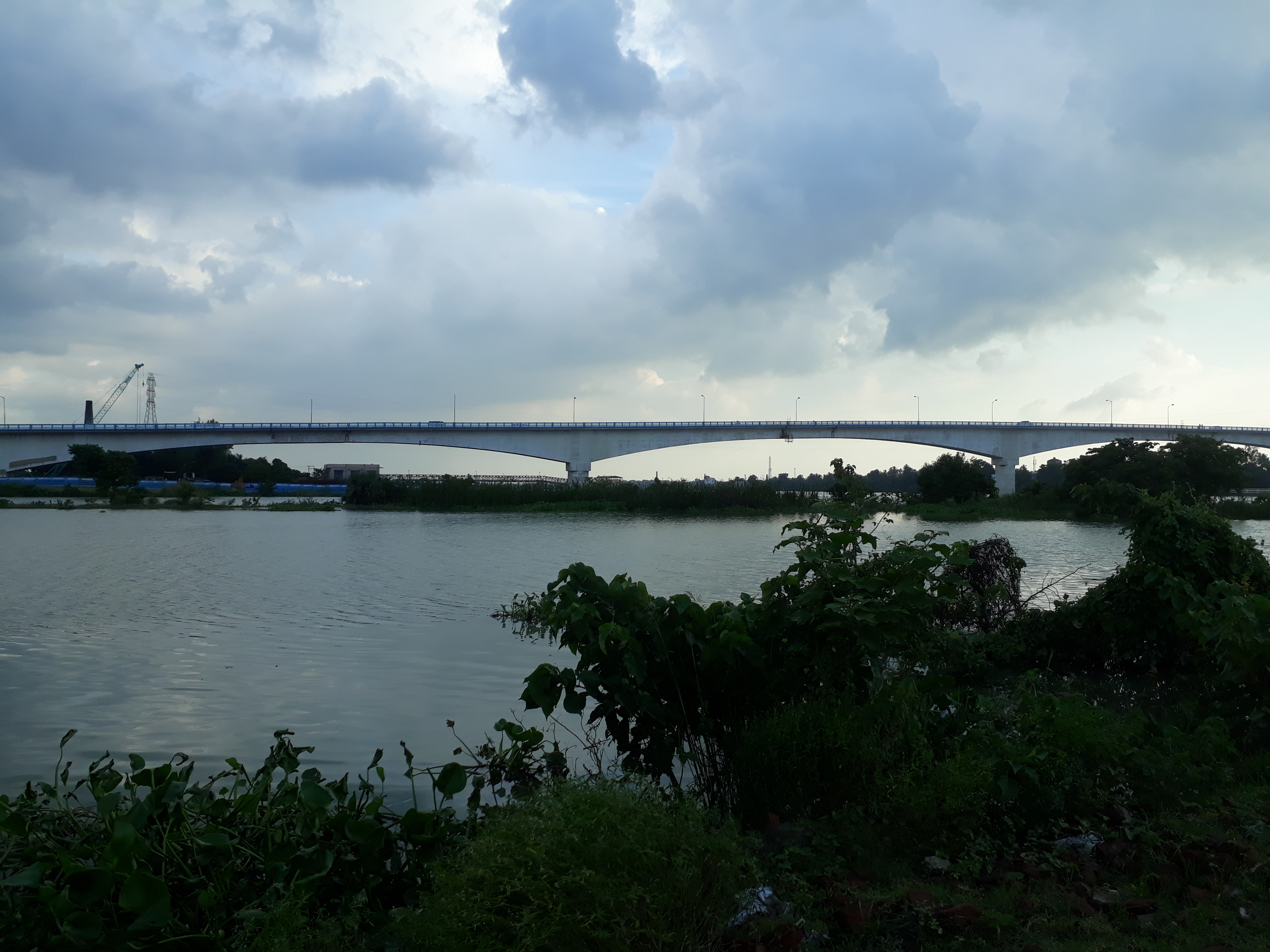

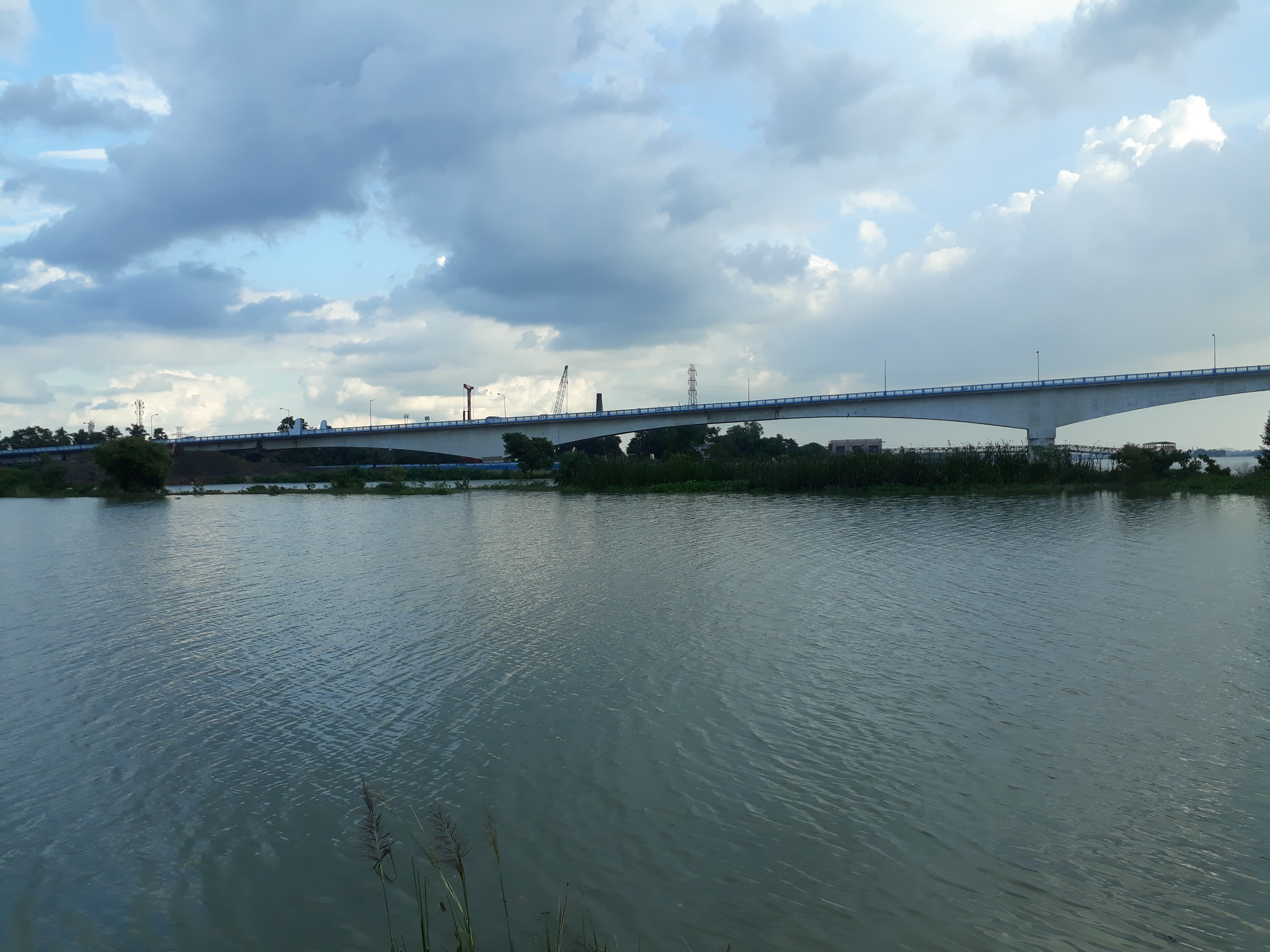

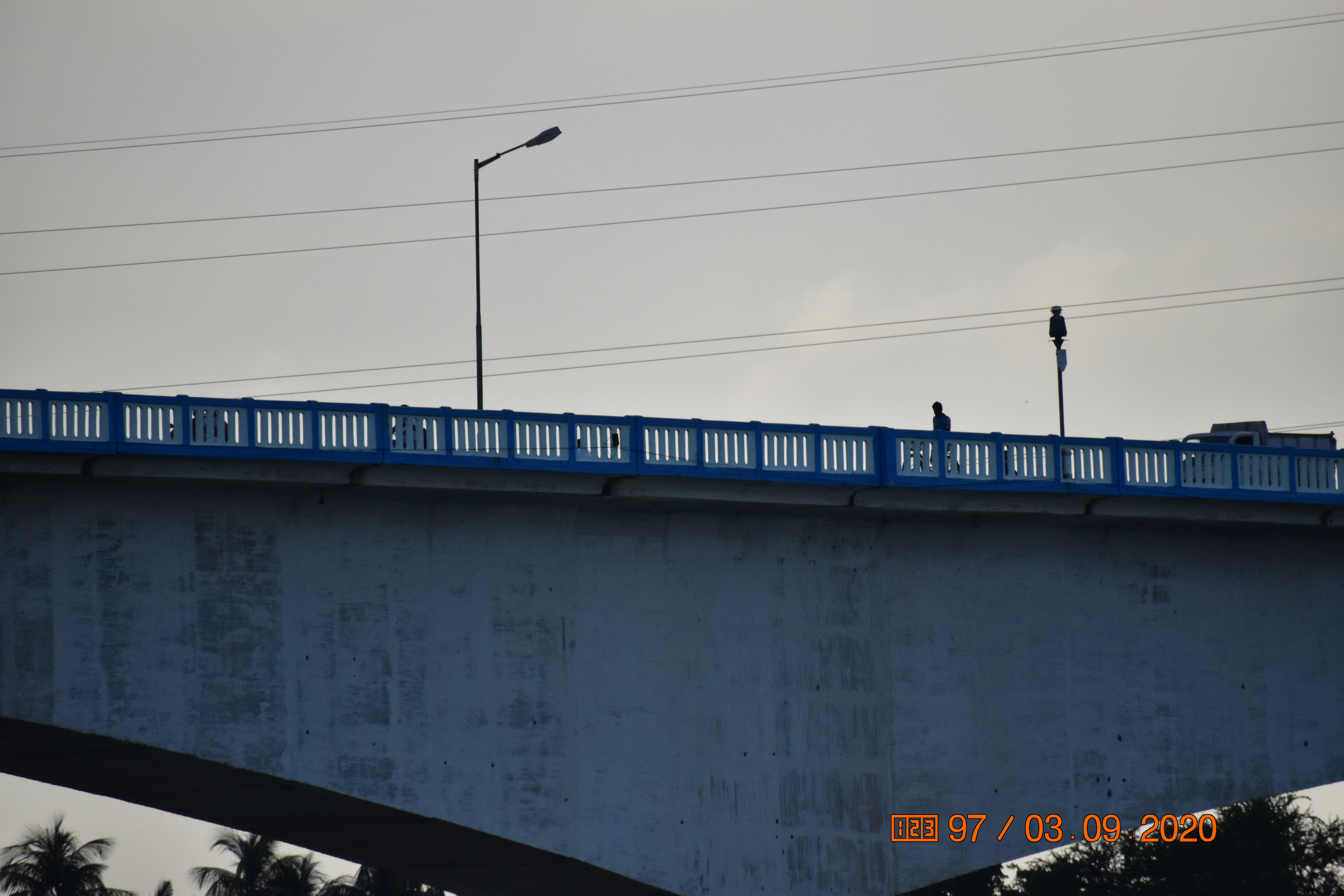

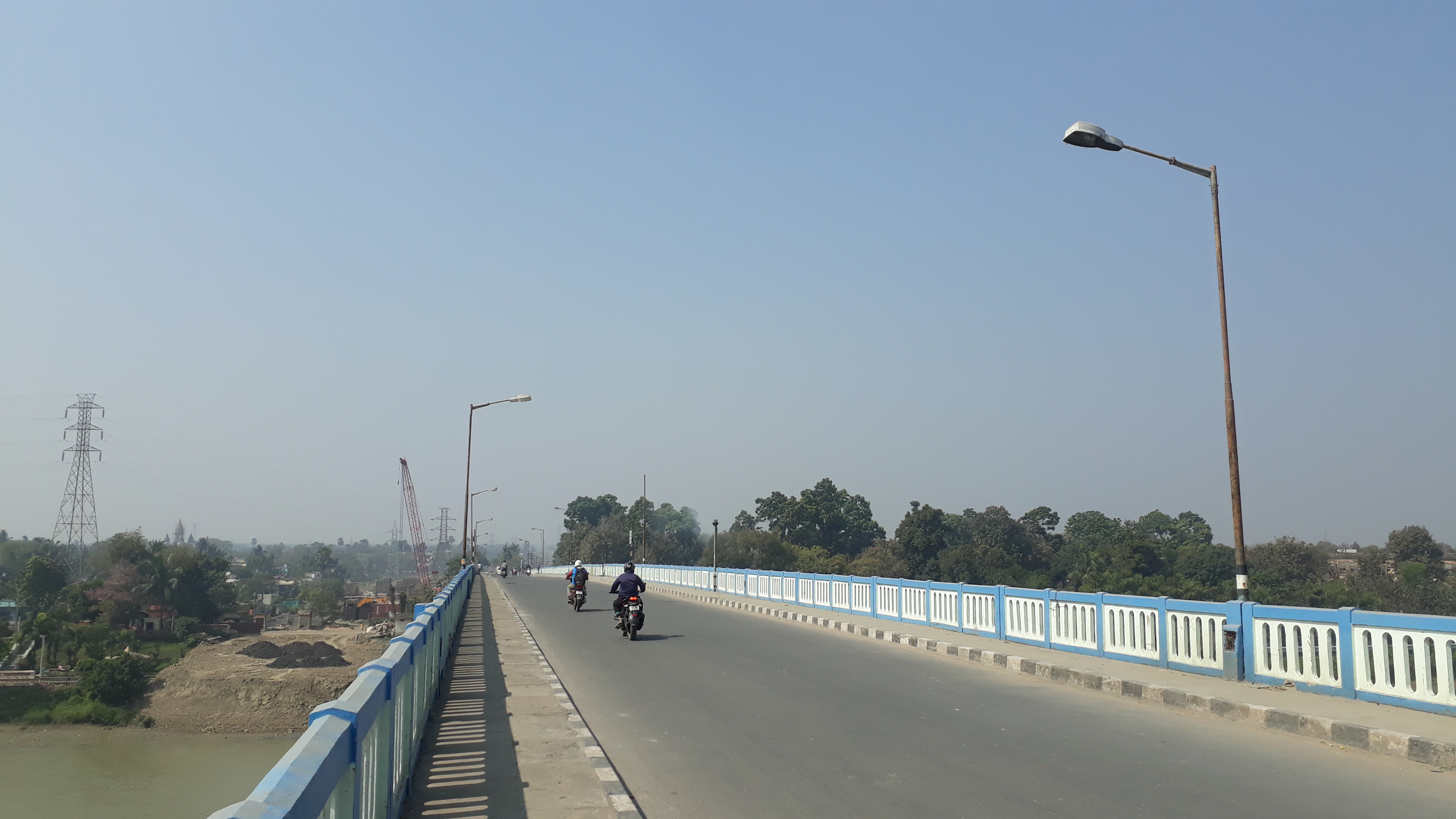
