= Second Ishwar Gupta Setu =

Bridge under construction in Kalyani Expressway, West Bengal

Second Iswar Gupta Setu দ্বিতীয় ঈশ্বর গুপ্ত সেতু
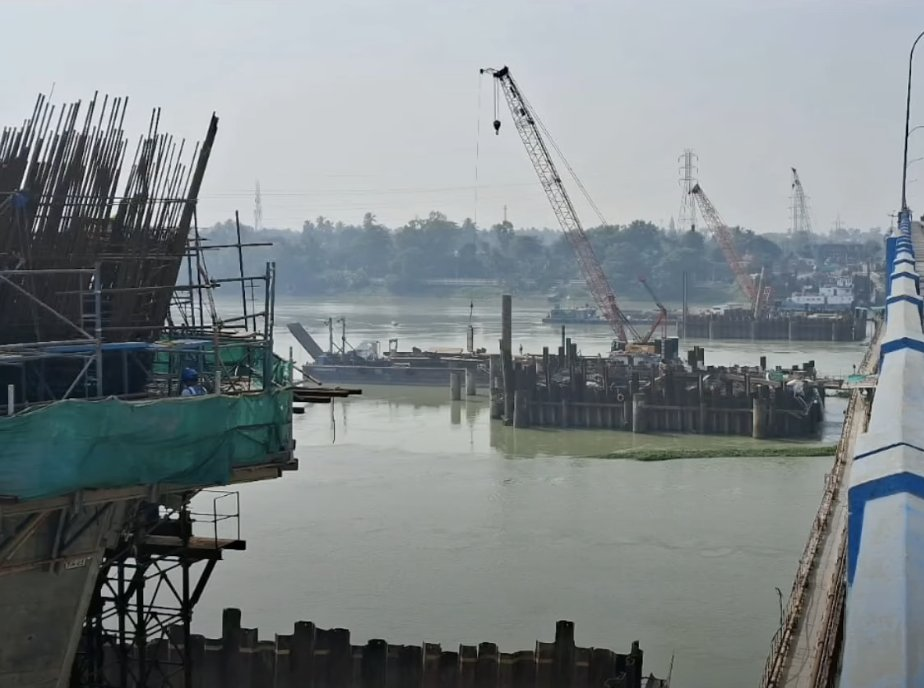
- The under-construction Second Ishwar Gupta Setu
- Coordinates: 22.967113°N 88.407653°E
- Carries: Kalyani Expressway, Roadway Only
- Crosses: Hooghly River
- Locale: Kalyani, Kolkata Metropolitan Region, India
- Named for: Ishwar Chandra Gupta
- Owner: WBHDC

Characteristics
- Design: extadosed cable-stayed bridge
- Material: Concrete, steel
- Total length: 714 metres (2,343 ft)
- Width: 35 metres (115 ft)
- Longest span: 120 metres (390 ft)
- No. of spans: 7
- No. of lanes: 6

History
- Designer: COWI
- Constructed by: Larsen & Toubro
- Construction start: 2018
- Construction cost: ₹1,396 crore (equivalent to ₹19 billion or US$220 million in 2023)

Location
- Interactive map of Second Iswar Gupta Setu

The Second Ishwar Gupta Setu is an under-construction Extradosed Cable-stayed bridge spanning the Hooghly River, connecting Kalyani with Bansberia in Kolkata Metropolitan Region. It will be one of the most important Roadway Bridges of the Kolkata metropolitan region, as it will be the fifth Roadway bridge crossing the Hooghly River within this Metropolitan area, alongside Vidyasagar Setu, Howrah Bridge, Nivedita Setu and Vivekananda Setu. It will facilitate crucial connectivity between the eastern and western parts of the Kolkata metropolitan region. The bridge is being constructed by Larsen & Toubro, to the design of RITES and is part of the Kalyani Expressway, under the jurisdiction of West Bengal Highway Development Corporation.

The concept of building a bridge across the Hooghly River was conceived in 2016. The original plan was to build a bridge as an alternative to the old Ishwar Gupta Setu, which would connect Delhi Road and State Highway 6 with Kalyani Expressway and National Highway 12. The Pylons of the bridge will lean outward from the deck, and they will be constructed using Concrete. The deck of the bridge consists of 7 Spans.

== History ==
=== Plans ===
The first bridge across the Hooghly River between Banshberia and Kalyani was constructed in 1989, but in the 2010s, structural defects and structural weaknesses were noticed in the bridge. A proposal for a new bridge to replace the old one was first raised in 2014. The approval of this bridge project was given by the Government of West Bengal in 2015. The bridge was planned as part of the 21 km long road project connecting Delhi Road and National Highway 12.

A competition was held for preparation of Detailed Project Report (DPR) for the bridge, where the engineering merits of the proposals were examined by Rail India Technical and Economic Service. Denmark's COWI agency was selected to prepare the Detailed Project Report (DPR). IIT Kharagpur, IIT Madras and IIT Kanpur were appointed as consultants for the bridge. Seismic aspects were seriously considered in approving the design.

=== Construction ===
A ceremony to mark the construction works was held in 2018.

== Description ==
=== Architectural features ===
The second Ishwar Gupta Bridge is an extadosed cable-stayed bridge. 6 concrete-built pylons hold the cables. The bridge consists of a steel-framed concrete deck including two carriageways, with a total length of 714 meters (2,343 ft). The total width of the two deck carriageways is 35 meters (115 ft).
