= North–East line =

Northeast Line or North East Line could refer to any railway or metro lines:

- North East Line, a metro line on the Singapore MRT
- North East railway line, a railway line in Victoria, Australia
- Gold Line (MARTA), formerly known as the Northeast Line, in Atlanta, Georgia, United States
- Northeast Corridor, an electrified railroad line serving the Northeast megalopolis in the United States
- Northeast Corridor Line, an NJ Transit commuter rail line
- Northeast Ring line (BCR), a train line of Beijing Suburban Railway

== See also ==
- Central line (disambiguation)
- North–South line (disambiguation)
- East–West line (disambiguation)
