= Crossrail (disambiguation) =

Crossrail is a railway construction project in London.

Crossrail may also refer to:

- Crossrail 2, a proposed railway route across London
- Crossrail Glasgow, a proposed railway development in Central Scotland
- Aberdeen Crossrail, a proposed railway development in north-east Scotland
- Edinburgh Crossrail, a former railway service in south-east Scotland
- Crossrail Place, the structure within Canary Wharf station in London that is above the Crossrail platforms
- MTR Crossrail, the company that operated the Crossrail concession in London

Rail freight companies:

- Crossrail AG, a former rail freight company in Switzerland, with subsidiaries in Italy and Belgium
- BLS Cargo Nord, formerly Crossrail Benelux, a rail freight company in Belgium, subsidiary of BLS Cargo

== See also ==
- East West Line (disambiguation)
