= Central subway =

Central subway may refer to:

- Central subway (Boston), the system of tunnels used by the MBTA Green Line
- Central Subway (San Francisco), a light rail tunnel used by Muni Metro’s T Third Street Line
- Central Link, now known as the 1 Line, a light rail line running between the cities of Seattle and SeaTac, part of Sound Transit's Link light rail system
- Sha Tin to Central Link, a heavy rail expansion project of the MTR in Hong Kong

== See also ==
- Central link (disambiguation)
- Central line (disambiguation)
