= Reference dimension =

Feature of an engineering drawing

A reference dimension is a dimension on an engineering drawing provided for information only. Reference dimensions are provided for a variety of reasons and are often an accumulation of other dimensions that are defined elsewhere (e.g. on the drawing or other related documentation). These dimensions may also be used for convenience to identify a single dimension that is specified elsewhere (e.g. on a different drawing sheet).

Reference dimensions are not intended to be used directly to define the geometry of an object. Reference dimensions do not normally govern manufacturing operations (such as machining) in any way and, therefore, do not typically include a dimensional tolerance (though a tolerance may be provided if such information is deemed helpful). Consequently, reference dimensions are also not subject to dimensional inspection under normal circumstances.

Reference dimensions are commonly used in CAD software along with constraints that usually denote the opposite: mandatory dimensions to be precisely followed.

== Notation ==
In computer-aided design (CAD) it is commonly used to denote dimensions.

=== REF ===
Prior to use of modern CAD software, reference dimensions were traditionally indicated on a drawing by the abbreviation "REF" written adjacent to the dimension (typically to the right or underneath the dimension).

However, standard ASME Y14.5 has changed the way references are marked, and the abbreviation "REF" has been replaced with the use of parentheses () around the dimension. As an example, a distance of 1500 millimeters might be denoted by (1500 mm) instead of 1500 mm REF.

This implementation has followed in modern CAD software that makes use of parentheses as the default denotation method whenever reference dimensions are "automatically" created by the software. The method for identifying a reference dimension (or reference data) on drawings is to enclose the dimension (or data) within parentheses.

== See also ==
- Engineering drawing abbreviations and symbols
  - Geometric dimensioning and tolerancing
- ASME Y14.5
