= Engineering drawing abbreviations and symbols =

Abbreviations and symbols used in engineering drawing

Engineering drawing abbreviations and symbols are used to communicate and detail the characteristics of an engineering drawing. This list includes abbreviations common to the vocabulary of people who work with engineering drawings in the manufacture and inspection of parts and assemblies.

Technical standards exist to provide glossaries of abbreviations, acronyms, and symbols that may be found on engineering drawings. Many corporations have such standards, which define some terms and symbols specific to them; on the national and international level, ASME standard Y14.38 and ISO 128 are two of the standards. The ISO standard is also approved without modifications as European Standard EN ISO 123, which in turn is valid in many national standards. Australia utilises the Technical Drawing standards AS1100.101 (General Principals), AS1100-201 (Mechanical Engineering Drawing) and AS1100-301 (Structural Engineering Drawing).

Abbreviation or symbol	Definition	Description
== A ==
AC	across corners	Commonly used when measuring the corners of a hex drive, such as a hex nut.
AF	across flats	Commonly used when measuring the flat surfaces of a hex drive, such as a hex nut.
AFF	above finished floor	A dimension that establishes a distance away from the finished floor. Example would be the top of a coffee table to the shag of the carpet, not where the bottom of the tables feet dig in.
AISI	American Iron and Steel Institute	The AISI acronym is commonly seen as a prefix to steel grades, for example, "AISI 4140". The SAE steel grade system was formerly a joint AISI-SAE system.
Al or AL	aluminium	
ALY	alloy	
AMER	American	Referring to the United States
AMS	Aerospace Material Standards	Standards in materials science and engineering maintained by SAE International and widely used in the aerospace manufacturing industries.
AN-	Army-Navy	A prefix for standard hardware (catalog hardware) ID numbers. Came from the era of circa 1890s-1945, when the U.S. Army and Navy were leading the way on product standardization for logistics improvement, yielding the United States Military Standards system. Today industry and ISO also do a lot of this standardization specification, freeing the U.S. DOD and military to do less of it (as explained at United States Military Standard > Origins and evolution), although many MIL standards are still current. (See also MS- and NAS.)
ANN	anneal, annealed	
ANSI	American National Standards Institute	And the many standards that it issues, for example, ANSI Z87.1.
APPROX	approximately	
AQL	acceptable quality level	The threshold of defectiveness that is allowable in a group of parts. It is trivial to say that no one wants any error, and that everyone wants uniform perfection; but in the real world, it almost never happens. The intelligence behind defining AQLs is in figuring out how much error is tolerable given the costs that would be incurred by any efforts to further reduce its incidence.
AR	as required	An abbreviation used in parts lists (PLs, LMs, BoMs) in the quantity-per-assembly field when a discrete count is not applicable. For example, in an assembly with a bolted joint using four bolts, the PL quantity column will say "4" for the bolt PN, "4" for the nut PN, and "AR" for the liquid threadlocker that will be applied.
AS	Aerospace Standards; Australian Standards	1. Aerospace Standards, technical standards maintained by SAE International and widely used in the aerospace manufacturing industries. Standard aerospace hardware sometimes has the AS- prefix in the catalog numbers. 2. Australian Standards, standards per Australian industry.
AS, APS, APV, AV, APSL, AVL	approved product supplier, approved vendor, approved-product-supplier list, approved-vendor list	When only certain companies are approved by the CDA to manufacture the product (that is, to make what the drawing depicts/defines), they are called by names such as "approved supplier", "approved product supplier", "approved vendor", or "approved product vendor". The list of such companies (which usually changes over time) is called an APSL, AVL, or similar names. Vetting the companies on this list requires the CDA to audit (and possibly periodically re-audit) the companies, which incurs an overhead expense for the CDA. Therefore, smaller companies will often cite larger companies' lists in order to avoid the cost of duplicating the effort.
ASA	American Standards Association	Former name for ANSI (1920s-1960s).
ASME	American Society of Mechanical Engineers	And the many standards that it issues, for example, ASME Y14.5.
ASSY or ASY	assembly	referring to an assembly of parts rather than just one (sub)part ("piece part", "detail part").
ASTM	Formerly the American Society for Testing and Materials; now ASTM International	Maintains technical standards, especially regarding materials science and engineering and metrology.
AVG	average	
AWG	American Wire Gauge	
== B ==
BASIC	basic dimension	A basic dimension is one that is the theoretical value without any tolerance range. It does not serve as an acceptance criterion. It is thus similar in some respects to a reference dimension. The reason why a basic dimension does not carry a tolerance is that its actual value will fall (acceptably) wherever it is put by other features' actual values, where the latter features are the ones with tolerances defined. A common and simple example is hole location: If a hole's centerpoint location has a position tolerance, then the centerpoint's coordinates do not need (and should not have) separate tolerances applied to them. Thus they are instead given as basic dimensions. In modern practice basic dimensions have a rectangular box around them, or sometimes the word "BASIC".
BC or B.C.	bolt circle	
BCD or B.C.D.	bolt circle diameter	
BHC	bolt hole circle	Same definition as the bolt circle diameter
BHCS	button head cap screw	Like an SHCS but with a button head.
BHN	Brinell hardness number	
BoM or BOM	bill of materials	Also called a list of materials (LM or L/M). Overlaps a lot in concept with a parts list (PL or P/L). There is no consistently enforced distinction between an L/M, a BoM, or a P/L.
BoP or BOP	bought out part	A part which is outsourced from an external supplier, or "bought out".
BP, B/P	blueprint	"per B/P" = "per drawing"
BRZ	bronze	
BSC	basic dimension	See basic dimension info above.
== C ==
CAD	computer-aided design, computer-aided drafting; cadmium [plating]	
CAGE	Commercial and Government Entity [code]	A CAGE code is a unique identifier to label an entity (that is, a specific government agency or corporation at a specific site) that is a CDA, ODA, or MFR of the part defined by the drawing. One corporation can have many CAGE codes, as can one government, because each division, department, and site (campus) can have its own CAGE code. The same CAGE code can change owners over the years. For example, a CAGE code that formerly referred to a certain Martin Marietta site will now refer to Lockheed Martin at that same site (although the buildings may have been replaced and the signage may say different names).
C-C or C-TO-C	centre-to-centre; on centres	Defines centre-to-centre distance of two features, such as two holes.
CBN	cubic boron nitride	A material from which some cutter inserts are made.
CDA	current design activity	The CDA is the entity (whether it be a corporation, a unit of a national military or ministry of defence, or another civilian government agency) that currently has design authority over the part design (definition). It may be the entity who first designed the part (that is, the ODA), but today it is also likely to be a designated successor entity, owing to mergers and acquisitions (M&A) activity (e.g., ODA company was bought by CDA company); contract letting (e.g., an Army engineering department ODA turns over the design activity to the prime contractor that makes most or all of the parts, turning that contractor into the new CDA); privatization (e.g., a government privatizes the design and manufacture of materiel, and a state arsenal [state armory] ODA transfers design authority to a private armory [defense contractor] ODA); or patent licensing (e.g., a patent-holding inventor [ODA] licenses one or several companies to manufacture products using his intellectual property, in which case the "same" part could end up with multiple design authorities, although they may not be considered the official/nominal CDA).
CERT or cert	certification	For example, certification of metallurgical content and processes
CG	centerless ground, centerless grinding	
	Center mark	Defines the center of a circle or partial circle.
CH or CHAM	chamfer	
CI	cast iron	No longer a commonly used abbreviation. Better to spell out for clarity.
CL or ℄	centreline or centerline; class	1. Center line, the central axis of a feature. 2. Class, for example, "paint per spec XYZ revision C type 1 class 2" may be abbreviated as "paint per spec XYZ REV C TY 1 CL 2" or even in some cases "paint per spec XYZ-C-1-2". (The latter practice is not uncommon but is cryptic for workers with minimal training and experience. The first two options are better practice.)
CML, CMC or CML&C	cement mortar lined, cement mortar coated, or cement mortar lined & coated	Commonly used together with "WSP" ("welded steel pipe")
CNC	computer numerical control	
CR	controlled radius	Radius of an arc or circle, with no flats or reversals. This strict version of radius definition is specified in demanding applications when the form of the radius must be controlled more strictly than "just falling within the dimensional tolerance zone". It is poor engineering to specify a CR instead of an R simply on the theory of enforcing good workmanship. CR is for critical features whose performance truly requires near-perfect geometry. Like most such characteristics, its presence increases the price of the part, because it raises the costs of manufacturing and quality assurance.
CRES	corrosion-resistant [steel]	Largely synonymous with stainless steel, unless specific grades, specs, and distinctions are made on the drawing. Some people treat CRES as a subset of the stainless steels.
CRS	cold rolled steel; on centres	Defines centre-to-centre distance of two features, such as two holes.
C/T	Correlation / Tracking	
C'BORE or CBORE or	counterbore	
CSK or CSINK or	countersink	
CTN, ctn	carton	
== D ==
	depth, deep, down	Defines the depth of a feature.
⌀	diameter	Diameter of a circle. In a feature control frame (FCF), the ⌀ symbol tells you that the tolerance zone for the geometric tolerance is cylindrical. Abbreviations for "diameter" include ⌀, DIA, and D.
D	diameter; delta	Abbreviations for "diameter" include ⌀, DIA, and D. For delta usage, see for example "delta notes".
DIA	diameter	Diameter of a circle. Abbreviations for "diameter" include ⌀, DIA, and D.
DIP	ductile iron pipe	
DIM	dimension, dimensioning	
DO, do	ditto	Seen occasionally in older drawings instead of repeating a given dimension.
DOD, DoD	[U.S.] Department of Defense	See also MOD.
DPD	digital product definition	A synonym of MBD.
DRG	drawing	(Australian Standard AS1100.101 pg.8 Table-1.1)
== E ==
ED	edge distance	Drilled holes, and fasteners are commonly required to have a minimum edge distance (min ED).
EO, ECO, ECN	engineering order	An order from the engineering department (to be followed by the production department or vendor) overriding/superseding a detail on the drawing, which gets superseded with revised information. Also called by various other names, such as engineering change order (ECO), engineering change notice (ECN), drawing change notice (DCN), and so on. See also REV.
EQL, EQ,EQS	equal, equally, equally spaced	For example, "⌀10 4X EQL SPACED ON BC" means "drill four holes of 10mm diameter equally spaced around the bolt circle." "6-⌀6.8 EQS PCD 50" means "drill 6 holes of 6.8mm diameter equally spaced on the Pitch Circle Diameter ⌀50."
ERC	electrical rule check	
EXIST.	existing	
== F ==
f	finish	An italic f (Latin small letter f) written on a line representing a surface was an old way of indicating that the surface was to be machined rather than left in the as-cast or as-forged state. The "f" came from "finish" in the sense of "machine finish" as opposed to raw stock/casting/forging. Later the ASA convened upon a letter V (specifically a sans-serif V) touching the surface. Soon this evolved into the "check mark" sign with accompanying number that tells the reader a max roughness value (RMS, microinches or micrometres) for the machined finish, to be measured with a profilometer.
FAO	finish all over	A note telling the manufacturer that all surfaces of the part are to be machined (as opposed to leaving any surfaces as-cast or as-forged). Not an obsolete usage, but not seen as commonly as it was decades ago; not least because parts that once would have been spot-faced castings are now likelier to be contoured from billet with CNC milling. But more importantly, best engineering practice today, reflecting design for manufacturability and avoidance of spurious cost drivers, is either to specify specific, quantifiable requirements for surfaces with specific needs (such as RMS roughness measurements in microinches or micrometres, plus any plating or painting needs), or to leave finish out of the part definition (and thus at the manufacturer's discretion) because it is not important to fit, function, or criticality. This same spirit is behind the shift in military standards from writing requirements about methods to writing them instead about performance, with the method to reach that goal being up to the ingenuity of the designer.
FCF	feature control frame	The rectangular box (with several cells) that conveys geometric tolerances in GD&T. It typically tells you what sort of geometric condition (e.g., parallel, perpendicular, round, concentric), followed by what size (and maybe shape) the tolerance zone is, and finally which datums it relates to, the order of gaging against them, and what material condition applies to them (LMC, MMC, or RFS). A diameter symbol (⌀) tells you that the zone for the geometric tolerance is cylindrical.
FD or F/D	field of the drawing	The [main] field of the drawing, as opposed to other areas of it, such as the parts list (P/L), general notes (G/N), flagnotes (F/N or FL), title block (T/B), rev block (R/B), bill of materials (B/M or BoM or BOM), or list of materials (L/M). Rationales for drawing changes that are noted in the rev block often use these abbreviations for brevity (e.g., "DIM 14.00 was 12.50; added default TOL info to T/B; added leader lines to F/D; added alternate hardware IDs to P/L; added alternate alloy to L/M").
FIM	full indicator movement	See also TIR.
FL	flag note, flagnote	A note that is called out in specific spots in the field of the drawing. It is numbered with a stylized flag symbol surrounding the number. A general note applies generally and is not called out with flags.
FL	Floor Level	Floor Level of an existing or proposed building or concrete pad
FN or F/N	flag note, flagnote; find number	1. Flagnote: A flagnote is a note that is called out in specific spots in the field of the drawing. It is numbered with a stylized flag symbol surrounding the number (or sometimes a delta symbol). A general note applies generally and is not called out with flags. 2. Find number: "FN" meaning "find number" refers to the ordinal number that gives an ID tag to one of the constituents in a parts list (list of materials, bill of materials). Thus "fasten using FN7" refers to a fastener that is "find number" 7 in the list.
FoS	feature of size	A type of physical feature on a part. An FoS is a feature that can have size associated with it, usually involving the opposition of two surfaces (e.g., the two diametrically opposite sides of a hole wall; the two opposite walls of a slot or flange). Features of size (FoSs) in reality always have actual sizes and forms that differ from their theoretical size and form; the purpose of tolerancing is to define whether the difference is acceptable or not. Thus material condition (LMC, MMC, somewhere in between, or RFS) is important in GD&T. ) A given geometric tolerance may be defined in relation to a certain FoS datum being at LMC or at MMC.
FPSO	Floating Production Storage and Offloading	An FPSO is a floating production system that receives fluids (crude oil, water and a host of other things) from a subsea reservoir through risers, which then separate fluids into crude oil, natural gas, water and impurities within the topsides production facilities on board. Crude oil stored in the storage tanks of the FPSO is offloaded onto shuttle tankers to go to market or for further refining onshore. FPSO and FSO (Floating Storage and Offloading) systems today have become the primary method for many offshore oil and gas producing regions around the world
FS	far side	The drawing notations "near side" and "far side" tell the reader which side of the part a feature is on, in occasional contexts where that fact is not communicated using the rules of projection alone. Contexts of usage are rather limited. One example is hole locations; "3X AND 3X FAR SIDE" defines symmetrical groups of 3 holes on both sides of a part (6 total), without having to redefine equivalent hole center coordinates on two separate views, one for each group. This is not only a convenience for the designer but also a method of error prevention, because it provides a way to avoid forking geometric definition that ideally should be kept unforked to prevent discrepancies. For example, the groups defined above cannot accidentally become asymmetrically discrepant in a future revision by the revisor failing to revise both groups equally (because their definition is unified in only one place). Another example is part marking locations. An area for part identification marking can be circled on a top view but assigned to either the top or bottom of the part simply with a "near side" or "far side" notation—which obviates adding any otherwise-unneeded bottom view to the field of the drawing.
FSCM	Federal Stock/Supply Code for Manufacturers	An older name for "CAGE code". Also NSCM (National Stock/Supply Code for Manufacturers).
FTG	fitting	
== G ==
GCI	gray cast iron	
GD&T or GDT	geometric dimensioning and tolerancing	A standardized language for defining and communicating dimensions and tolerances.
GN or G/N	general note(s)	Most engineering drawings have a notes list, which includes both general notes and flag notes.
== H ==
HBW	hardness, Brinell, tungsten tip	See Brinell scale. (The "W" comes from the element symbol for tungsten, W, which comes from the German Wolfram.)
HDPE	high-density polyethylene	
HHCS	hex head cap screw	
HRA	hardness, Rockwell, A scale	See Rockwell scale.
HRB	hardness, Rockwell, B scale	See Rockwell scale.
HRC	hardness, Rockwell, C scale	See Rockwell scale.
HRS	hot rolled steel	
HT TR	heat treat, heat treatment	
H&T or H/T or HT	hardened and tempered	A form of heat treatment in which the metal is first hardened and then tempered. Compare N&T.
== I ==
IAW	in accordance with	A common need in engineering drawings is to instruct the user to do activity X in accordance with technical standard Y. For example, "Weld all subassemblies IAW AWS XYZ.123" means "Weld all subassemblies in accordance with American Welding Society standard number XYZ.123" (the number is hypothetical in this example). The word "per" is functionally equivalent to "IAW" in such contexts; thus "rivet all sheet metal per MIL-PRF-123456" or "[...] IAW MIL-PRF-123456". Part of the motivation behind the choice of words "in accordance with" is that they do not allege that any particular activity is explicitly specified by standard XYZ.123 (which "per" could be interpreted as alleging, at least in connotation); rather, these words merely instruct the user that whatever s/he does must not contradict the standard in any way. But this is a subtle connotative distinction, and "per" and "IAW" are denotatively equivalent.
ID	inner diameter; identity, identification number	
IED	Insufficient Edge Distance	Drilled holes commonly have a required minimum edge distance, if the inspection finds that the edge distance is below minimum, then commonly reported as having an IED condition.
IP	Intersection Point	Commonly used to highlight intersection points of structural member centre lines. At times the IP is a theoretical point as the structural member is shorter due to the physical connection geometry.
ISO	International Organization for Standardization	And the many standards that it specifies, for example, ISO 10303
== J ==
JIS	Japan Industrial Standard	Reference to standards published by the Japanese Standards Association
== K ==
KEY	key	Drawing callouts marked "KEY" define "key characteristics" that are considered especially important for fit, function, safety, or other reasons. They are thus subjected to higher inspection sampling levels.
KPSI, kpsi	kilopounds per square inch, that is, thousands of pounds per square inch	See discussion at synonym KSI.
KSI, ksi	kilopounds per square inch, that is, thousands of pounds per square inch	KSI (or ksi), also abbreviated KPSI or kpsi, is a common non-SI measurement scale for ultimate tensile strength, that is, the number of units of tensile force that a material can endure per unit of cross-sectional area before breaking. In the SI system, the unit is the pascal (Pa) (or a multiple thereof, often megapascals (MPa), using the mega- prefix); or, equivalently to pascals, newtons per square metre (N/m^{2}).
== L ==
LDD	limited dimension drawing	An implementation of model-based definition that still uses a 2D drawing, but only containing critical information. All information missing from the drawing is to be pulled from a 3D model of the part or assembly.
LH	left-hand	Referring to handedness, such as the helix handedness of screw threads or the mirror-image handedness of a symmetrical pair of parts.
LM or L/M	list of materials	Also called a bill of materials (BoM, BOM). Overlaps a lot in concept with a parts list (PL or P/L). There is no consistently enforced distinction between an L/M, a BoM, or a P/L.
LMC	least material condition	A material condition in GD&T. Means that a feature of size (FoS) is at the limit of its size tolerance in the direction that leaves the least material on the part. Thus an internal feature of size (e.g., a hole) at its biggest diameter, or an external feature of size (e.g., a flange) at its smallest thickness. The GD&T symbol for LMC is a circled L. (See also MMC and RFS.) A given geometric tolerance may be defined in relation to a certain FoS datum being at LMC or at MMC.
== M ==
MACH	machine; machined	
MAJ	major	As in major diameter, or major characteristic (for sampling level)
MAX	maximum	
MBD	model-based definition	Definition of the part via a 3D CAD model rather than via a 2D engineering drawing. Drawings may be printed (plotted) from the model for reference use, but the model remains the governing legal instrument.
MBP	measurement between pins	threads, splines, gears (internal, female) (synonymous with MBW) (see also MOP, MOW)
MBW	measurement between wires	threads, splines, gears (internal, female) (see also MBP, MOP, MOW)
MF or M/F	make from	When one part number is made from another, it means to take part A and machine some additional features into it, creating part B. The parts list or L/M, in the "material" field, will say "M/F PN 12345".
MFD	manufactured	
MFG	manufacturing	
MFR	manufacturer	May be the same entity as the CDA or ODA, or may not be.
MIL-	[U.S.] Military	A prefix for the names of various United States Military Standards and Specifications, for example, MIL-STD-*, MIL-SPEC-*, MIL-DTL-*, MIL-PRF-*, MIL-A-*, MIL-C-*, MIL-S-*, MIL-STD-1913, MIL-STD-1397.
MIN	minimum; minutes; minor	
MMC	maximum material condition	A material condition in GD&T. Means that a feature of size (FoS) is at the limit of its size tolerance in the direction that leaves the most material on the part. Thus an internal feature of size (e.g., a hole) at its smallest diameter, or an external feature of size (e.g., a flange) at its biggest thickness. The GD&T symbol for MMC is a circled M. (See also LMC and RFS.) A given geometric tolerance may be defined in relation to a certain FoS datum being at LMC or at MMC.
MOD, MoD	Ministry of Defence [U.K. and others]	See also DOD.
MOP, MoP	measurement over pins	threads, splines, gears (external, male) (synonymous with MOW, measurement over wires)
MOW, MoW	measurement over wires	threads, splines, gears (external, male) (see also MBW, MBP, MOP)
MPa, MPA	megapascals	The common SI measurement scale for ultimate tensile strength (UTS), that is, the number of units of tensile force that a material can endure per unit of cross-sectional area before breaking. There is only one correct casing for the symbol, cap-M-cap-P-small-a, which, like any SI unit of measurement symbol, properly should be preserved even when surrounding text is styled in all caps (which latter is a frequently employed tradition in engineering drawing). But it is not uncommon to see "MPA" through carelessness. Users are not confused regardless. In non-SI terms, the unit for UTS is the KSI (or ksi), which see herein.
MRB	material review board	A committee that reviews some nonconforming materials which are submitted as potentially still usable/saleable (if the nonconformance does not hinder fit or function).
MS-	[U.S.] Military Standard	Standards established by the U.S. military and widely used in the aerospace manufacturing (military and civil) and other defense industries. Standard hardware sometimes uses the MS- prefix in the catalog numbers. (See also AN- and NAS.)
== N ==
NAS	National Aerospace Standards	Standards maintained by SAE International and widely used in the aerospace manufacturing industries. The "National" formerly implicitly referenced the US, but today NAS and other standards are used globally. Standard hardware for aerospace work sometimes uses the NAS- prefix in the catalog numbers. (See also AN- and MS-.)
NC	National Coarse; numerical control	The [U.S.] National Coarse series of pre-1949 corresponds today to the Unified National Coarse (UNC) of the Unified Thread Standard.
NCM	nonconforming material(s)	This abbreviation is used in a machine shop when recording nonconformances (out of tolerance, etc.). For example, "An NCM tag was tied to the scrap part."
NCR	nonconformance report	A report listing nonconformances (out of tolerance, etc.). Helps to analyze system weaknesses (such as worn-out equipment, operators in need of more training, or risky practices).
NEC	not elsewhere classified; National Electrical Code	In the sense of "not elsewhere classified", the abbreviation is well known within certain fields, but not others; to avoid confusion, spell out. The National Electrical Code is a standard for electrical work.
NEF	National Extra Fine	The [U.S.] National Extra Fine series of pre-1949 corresponds today to the Unified National Extra Fine (UNEF) of the Unified Thread Standard.
NF	National Fine	The [U.S.] National Fine series of pre-1949 corresponds today to the Unified National Fine (UNF) of the Unified Thread Standard.
NL or N/L	notes list	A list of notes that appears somewhere on the drawing, often in the upper left corner.
NOM	nominal	
NORM or NORMD	normalized	referring to normalization, a stress-relieving heat treatment. See also HT TR.
NPS	Naval Primary Standard	(Not to be confused with annotating strait pipe as "NPS", which should instead be annotated NPSM, NPSL, or NPSH)
NPT	National Pipe Taper	A subset series of the Unified Thread Standard.
NS	National Special; near side	1. National Special, a screw thread series; see Unified Thread Standard. An extensible series, covering various special threads. 2. Near side: The drawing notations "near side" and "far side" tell the reader which side of the part a feature is on, in occasional contexts where that fact is not communicated using the rules of projection alone. Contexts of usage are rather limited. See "far side" for examples.
NSCM	National Stock/Supply Code for Manufacturers	An older name for "CAGE code". Also FSCM (Federal Stock/Supply Code for Manufacturers).
N&T or N/T or NT	normalized and tempered	A form of heat treatment in which the metal is first normalized (stress-relieved) and then tempered. Compare H&T.
NTS	not to scale	See also Engineering drawing > Scale.
== O ==
oc on center OD outside diameter == P ==
pc, pcs	piece, pieces	
PD	pitch diameter	
PCD, P.C.D.	Pitch Circle Diameter	The Pitch Circle Diameter (PCD) is the diameter of that circle that passes through the center of all the bolt holes or wheel bolts or wheel rim holes or studs. The best example is Flanges, there are multiple holes in the Flanges, the circle through the center of these holes is known as the pitch circle, and the diameter of this circle is known as Pitch Circle Diameter, in short PCD.
PDM, PDMS	product data management, product data manager [app], product data management system [app]	A database(s) and related application(s) that facilitate all aspects of managing data files—e.g., TDPs, TDP versions, drawings, model datasets, specs, addenda, certs, memoranda, EOs, ECOs, DCNs, RFQs, quotes, POs, e-mails, faxes, photos, word processor documents, spreadsheets. See also PLM.
PH or P/H	precipitation hardening, precipitation-hardened; pilot hole	
PHR BRZ	phosphor bronze	
PL or P/L	parts list	A list, usually tabular and often on the drawing (if not accompanying the drawing on a separate sheet), listing the parts needed in an assembly, including subparts, standard parts, and hardware. There is no consistently enforced distinction between an L/M, a BoM, or a P/L.
PLM	product lifecycle management; plant lifecycle management	See also PDM.
PMI	Product and manufacturing information	Product and manufacturing information conveys non-geometric attributes in 3D computer-aided design (CAD) and Collaborative Product Development systems necessary for manufacturing product components and assemblies.
PN or P/N	part number	
POI	point of intersection	A point that makes easier the layout, toolpath programming, or inspection of the part. It is the intersection point of lines that may not meet on the finished part, such as the tangent lines of a curve or the theoretical sharp corner (TSC) that edge-breaking and deburring will remove. See also SC, TSC, and AC.
P.F.	press fit	A fastening or mating between two parts which is achieved by friction after the parts are pushed together.
PSI	pounds per square inch	A unit of measurement for pressure. See also KSI.
PTFE	polytetrafluoroethylene	Also well known by the brand name Teflon.
PVC	polyvinyl chloride	
== Q ==
QMS	quality management system	A system in place to ensure that quality of manufacture is produced and maintained; a system to prevent defective parts from being made, or, even if made, from getting into finished inventories.
QTY or qty	quantity	
== R ==
R	radius	Radius of an arc or circle. Flats and reversals (falling within the dimensional tolerance zone) are tolerated unless "CR" (controlled radius) is explicitly specified.
RA, Ra	roughness, average; Rockwell A scale	See surface roughness; see Rockwell scale.
RB, Rb	Rockwell B scale	See Rockwell scale.
RC, Rc	Rockwell C scale	See Rockwell scale.
REF or ( )	reference dimension	See Reference dimension. On a technical drawing a dimension or note that is given only for reference and therefore is not intended to be used as a part acceptance criterion (although it may be used as an aid to production or inspection). Parenthesis( value ) denote the same thing and were standardized by ASME. When a dimension is defined in one view but also mentioned again in another view, it will be given as reference in the second case. This rule prevents the mistake of defining it in two different ways accidentally; the "main" (non-reference) mention is the only one that counts as a feature definition and thus as a part acceptance criterion. See also basic dimensions, which are similar in some respects.
REQD or REQ'D	required	For example, "4 REQD" written next to a fastener means that four of those fasteners are required for the assembly.
REV	revision	Engineering drawings and material or process specifications are often revised; the usual revision control convention is to label the versions A, B, C, D, etc.; a revision block (rev block) is a tabular area on the drawing (typically in the upper right corner) that lists the revision letters, a brief description of the changes and reasons, and approval initials and dates. Revisions beyond "Z" start the alphabet over again with doubling, e.g., AA, AB, AC, AD, and so on. In the days of manual drafting, redrawing was expensive, so engineering orders (EOs, ECOs, DCNs, ECNs) were not always incorporated into a next-letter revision. They thus accompany the drawing as part of the TDP. With the dissemination of software usage (CAD, CAM, PDMSs), revision control is often better handled nowadays, in competent hands at least. In recent years the revision control of engineering drawings has even been standardized by ASME, in their standard Y14.35M.
RFS	regardless of feature size	A material condition (or more precisely, freedom from such) in GD&T. Means that a given geometric tolerance is true in relation to a certain datum regardless of its actual size (LMC ≤ actual size ≤ MMC).
RH	right-hand	Referring to handedness, such as the helix handedness of screw threads or the mirror-image handedness of a symmetrical pair of parts.
RHR	roughness height reading	See surface roughness.
RL	Reduced Level or Relative Level	Surface Level
RMA	return material authorization	See also RTV.
RMS	root mean square	RMS in general is a statistical technique to define a representative value for a group of data points. With regard to surface roughness, it means that the heights of the individual microscopic peaks and valleys shall be averaged together via RMS to yield a measurement of roughness. See also herein f as a finish mark.
RT or R/T	rough turn, rough turned; room temperature	Rough-turned means turned on a lathe but not finished to a final machined dimension and surface roughness. Can apply to bar stock or to parts in-process. Room temperature is sometimes abbreviated "RT" within tables of specs for finishing operations (plating, painting, etc.).
RTP	release to production	The issuance of a drawing from the engineering/design activity to the production activity. In other words, the event when a draft becomes a completed, official document. A stamp on the drawing saying "ISSUED" documents that RTP has occurred.
RTV	room-temperature vulcanizing; return to vendor	1. RTV sealants, a way to seal joints. 2. Return to vendor, send parts back to a vendor for rework or refund because they are nonconforming. Such RTV often requires an RMA.
RZ, Rz	roughness, mean depth	See surface roughness.
== S ==
SAE	Formerly the Society of Automotive Engineers; now SAE International	And the many standards that it issues, for example, the SAE AMS and SAE AS standards series.
SC or S/C	sharp corners	Dimensions may be given as "across sharp corners" although the corners get radiused. In other words, distances may be given from intersection points where lines intersect, regardless of edge breaks or fillets. This is usually implied by default, so "S/C" often need not be explicitly added. But in some cases it clarifies the definition. See also TSC, POI, and AC.
SF or S/F	spotface slip fit	
SFACE or S/FACE	spotface	
SHCS	socket head cap screw	A cap screw with a socket head (usually implying a hex socket, driven with a hex key.
SHN	shown	See Part number > Symmetrical parts for explanation.
SHSS	socket head set screw	A set screw with a socket head (usually implying a hex socket, driven with a hex key.
SI	Système international [d'unités] [International System of Units]	The metric system in its current form (latest standards).
SN or S/N	serial number	
SOL ANN	solution anneal, solution annealed	
SPEC or spec	specification	
SPHER ANN	spheroidize anneal	
SPOTFACE	Spot facing	
SR	spherical radius	Radius of a sphere or spherical segment.
SS or S/S	stainless steel; supersede	1. Stainless steel, see also CRES. 2. Supersede/supersedes/superseded, refers to when one document (specification, standard, drawing, etc.) replaces (supersedes) another (see also revision control).
SST	stainless steel	As per Y14.38–2007
STD	standard	
STEP	Standard for the Exchange of Product Model Data	A standard format defined by ISO 10303 for MBD data generation, storage, and exchange.
STA	solution treated and aged	
STI	screw thread insert	
STL	steel	
STK	stock	A nominal dimension for the stock material, such as bar stock
SW	Schlüsselweite	Translates as Key or Wrench Width. Width across flats, often found on drawings of German origin.
== T ==
TAP	tapped hole	Usually implies drilling a hole if the hole does not already exist.
TB or T/B	title block	An area of the drawing, almost always at the bottom right, that contains the title of the drawing and other key information. Typical fields in the title block include the drawing title (usually the part name); drawing number (usually the part number); names and/or ID numbers relating to who designed and/or manufactures the part (which involves some complication because design and manufacturing entities for a given part number often change over the years due to mergers and acquisitions, contract letting, privatization, and the buying and selling of intellectual property—see CDA and ODA); company name (see previous comment); initials/signatures of the original draftsman (as wells as the original checker and tracer in the days of manual drafting); initials/signatures of approving managers (issuance/release-to-production information); cross-references to other documents; default tolerancing values for dimensions, geometry, and surface roughness; raw-material info (if not given in a separate list/bill of materials); and access control information (information about who is authorized to possess, view, or share copies of the information encoded by the drawing, e.g., classification notices, copyright notices, patent numbers). Drawing revision (versioning) information is not always included in the title block because it often appears in a separate revisions block.
TCC	time-current curve	
TDP	technical data package	The complete package of information that defines a part, of which the drawing itself is often only a subset. It also includes engineering orders (drawing change notices), 3D model datasets, data tables, memoranda, and any special conditions called out by the purchase order or the companies' terms-and-conditions documents.
THD or thd	thread	
THRD	threaded	
THK or thk	thickness	
THRU	through	Optionally applied to a hole dimension to signify that the hole extends through the workpiece. For example, THRU may be stated in a hole dimension if the hole's end condition is not clear from graphical representation of the workpiece.
THRU ALL	Through all	Similar to THRU. Sometimes used on hole dimensions for clarity to denote that the hole extends through multiple open space features as it goes through the whole workpiece.
TIR	total indicator reading; total indicated run-out	For measurements of eccentricity and other deviations from nominal geometry
TOS	top of steel	
TOL	tolerance, tolerancing	
TSC	theoretical sharp corner(s)	See discussion at SC and POI.
TY	type	For an explanation of "type" abbreviated as "TY", see the example given at "CL" meaning "class".
TYP	Typical	Other features share the same characteristic. For example, if the drawing shows 8 holes on a bolt circle, and just one is dimensioned, with "TYP" or "(TYP)" following the dimension label, it means that that hole is typical of all 8 holes; in other words, it means that the other 7 holes are that size also. The latest revisions of Y14.5 deprecate "TYP" by itself in favor of the specifying of a number of times, such as "2X" or "8X". This helps avoid any ambiguity or uncertainty. TYP or Typical was described in Mil-Std-8, the directing body prior to adoption of the dimension tolerance interpretation Y14.5 series. Its last revision was C in 1963, but can still be found in many older aircraft drawings.
== U ==
UAI	use as-is	One of the possible MRB dispositions. Others include scrap and rework.
ULL	under low limit	This abbreviation is used in a machine shop when recording nonconformances. For example, "part scrapped because OD is ULL." See also OHL.
UNC	Unified National Coarse	A subset series of the Unified Thread Standard.
UNEF	Unified National Extra Fine	A subset series of the Unified Thread Standard.
UNF	Unified National Fine	A subset series of the Unified Thread Standard.
UNJC	Unified National "J" series Coarse	A subset series of the Unified Thread Standard, with controlled root radius and increased minor diameter. For applications requiring maximum fatigue resistance amid chronic vibration (such as in aircraft).
UNJF	Unified National "J" series Fine	A subset series of the Unified Thread Standard, with controlled root radius and increased minor diameter. For applications requiring maximum fatigue resistance amid chronic vibration (such as in aircraft).
UNO	unless noted otherwise	A fairly well-known abbreviation, but to avoid confusion, spell out.
UNS	Unified National Special; unified numbering system	Unified National Special is a subset series of the Unified Thread Standard. It is an extensible series, covering various special threads. The unified numbering system is a vaguely named standard for naming alloys by principal element percentages.
UON	unless otherwise noted	A little-used (thus not well recognized) abbreviation. To avoid confusion, spell out.
UOS	unless otherwise specified	A fairly well-known abbreviation, but to avoid confusion, spell out.
USASI	United States of America Standards Institute	Former name for ANSI (1966–1969).
USS	United States Standard; United States Steel	U.S. Standard threads became the National series (e.g., NC, NF, NEF), which became the Unified National series (e.g., UNC, UNF, UNEF); see Unified Thread Standard. As for U.S. Steel, it was once the largest steel company on earth, often an approved supplier, and not infrequently a sole source; hence its mention on drawings.
UTS	ultimate tensile strength; Unified Thread Standard	
== V ==
v	finish	A letter v (Latin small letter v) written on a line representing a surface is a way to indicate that the surface is to be machined rather than left in the as-cast or as-forged state. The older symbol for this was a small script (italic) f (see herein f). Later the ASA convened upon a letter V (specifically a sans-serif V) touching the surface. Soon this evolved into the "check mark" sign with accompanying number that tells the reader a max roughness value (RMS, microinches or micrometres) for the machined finish, to be measured with a profilometer.
== W ==
WC	tungsten carbide	The "W" comes from the element symbol for tungsten, W, which comes from the German Wolfram.
WI	wrought iron	Both the material and the abbreviation are obsolete, or nearly so. Spell out the words if this material is to be mentioned at all in modern drawings.
W/I, w/i	within	A little-used abbreviation. Better to spell out for clarity.
WSP	Welded steel pipe	Commonly used with cement mortar lining (see "CMC, CML, CML&C")
W/O, w/o	without	Better to spell out for clarity.
== X ==
_X_	used to indicate the word “by”	When the letter X is preceded by a space, this means "by". For example, a chamfer may be called out as
X or ( )	number of places—for example, 8X or (8)	When a dimension is used in multiple places either of these prefixes can be added to the dimension to define how many times this dimension is used. This example signifies eight places. There should be no whitespace between the numeral and the letter X. (Note on character encoding: Although in typography (including Unicode) the letter X and the multiplication sign (×) are distinct characters with differing glyphs, it is a longstanding tradition in engineering drawing that the letter X is interchangeable with the multi sign, unless otherwise specified by the CAx systems used.)
== Y ==
Y14.X	—	Calls out the drawing standard that this drawing is following. For example, ASME Y14.5 and Y14.100 are commonly used standards that define all of the symbols and drafting conventions used.
YS	yield strength	
== See also ==
- List of geometric dimensioning and tolerancing symbols

== Bibliography ==
=== Sources cited ===
- ASME (1997), Y14.35M–1997: Revision of engineering drawings and associated documents, ASME, archived from the original on 2013-04-14.
- ASME (2007), Y14.38–2007: Abbreviations and acronyms for use on drawings and related documents, ASME.
- French, Thomas E.; Vierck, Charles J.; et al. (1953), A manual of engineering drawing for students and draftsmen (8th ed.), New York, New York, USA: McGraw-Hill, LCCN 52013455. Throughout, but especially pp. 689–690, appendix list of abbreviations and symbols.

ASME standards
Y14.100–2004	Engineering drawing practices
Y14.24–1999	Types and applications of engineering drawings
Y14.3–2003	Multiview and sectional view drawings
Y14.31–2008	Undimensioned drawings
Y14.36M–1996	Surface texture symbols
Y14.38–2007	Abbreviations and acronyms for use on drawings and related documents
Y14.4M–1989	Pictorial drawing
Y14.41–2003	Digital product definition data practices
Y14.42–2002	Digital approval systems
Y14.5–2018	Dimensioning and tolerancing
Y14.5.1M–1994	Mathematical definition of dimensioning and tolerancing principles
Y14.6–2001	Screw thread representation
Y32.7–1972	Graphics symbols for railroad maps and profiles
