= Constraint (computer-aided design) =

Imposed limitations in computer-aided design

The shaft and pulleys share a common centerline. The constraints of the key are set in relation to the keyseat.

A constraint in computer-aided design (CAD) software is a limitation or restriction imposed by a designer or an engineer upon geometric properties of an entity of a design model (i.e. sketch) that maintains its structure as the model is manipulated. These properties can include relative length, angle, orientation, size, shift, and displacement. The plural form constraints refers to demarcations of geometrical characteristics between two or more entities or solid modeling bodies; these delimiters are definitive for properties of theoretical physical position and motion, or displacement in parametric design. The exact terminology, however, may vary depending on a CAD program vendor.

Constraints are widely employed in CAD software for solid modeling, computer-aided architectural design such as building information modeling, computer-aided engineering, assembly modeling, and other CAD subfields. Constraints are usually used for the creation of 3D assemblies and multibody systems.

A constraint may be specified for two or more entities at once. For instance, two lines may be constrained to have equal length or diameter of circles can be set to have the same dimension (e.g., radius or length). Moreover, the constraint may be applied to solid models to be locked or fixed in a specified space. Concept of constraints is applicable for both two- (2D) three-dimensional (3D) sketches (including the ones used to create extrusions and solid bodies).

The concept of constraints initially emerged in the 1960s and were further developed in the 1970-80s.

== History ==
The original idea of "constraints" was introduced by Ivan Sutherland in 1975. It is derived from ideas employed in Sketchpad system made in 1963. In his work he argued that the usefulness of a technical drawing made by a computer program relied on their structured nature. Compared to traditional drawings that lack this feature the virtual ones had advantages in keeping track of and recalculating dimensions of entities (lines, angles, areas etc.). These ideas were integrated into a CAD system that maintained this structure as a designer manipulated geometric model.

In the 1970s the idea was further extended into three-dimensional space. In the 80s, a more generalized constraint-based programming language approach emerged and found some application in CAD software. At least one conceptual prototype was built in 1989.

== Overview ==
The purpose of constraints in a design is to control and limit the behavior of the entities and bodies in relation to another entity, plane or body. Effective constraints or mates between two or more bodies may exist at the assembly level of these or between two or more entities in defining a sketch, but adding conflicting, unnecessary or redundant constraints may result in an overdefined sketch and an error message.

=== Degrees of freedom ===
Development of a good constraining system might be a time-consuming process. One approach to this situation may be referred as removing degrees of freedom (DOF). The latter are often represented by (X,Y,Z) coordinates in space. The designer may quickly figure out whether an entity is constrained or not by counting the number of DOFs removed from it.

== Types ==
=== Geometric constraints ===
There are several constraints that may be applied between entities or bodies depending on their actual natural geometry (may also be referred to as ’’mates’’): collinearity, perpendicularity, tangency, symmetry, coincidency, and parallelism are ways of establishing the orientation of the entity.

Various types of constraints
Type	Applied to	Action	Examples
Coincident	Points, Circle, Arcs	Forces several points from separate geometric entities to share the same coordinate in space (e.g. X, Y, Z); as one point is being moved, all others match its coordinate changes	Points of 2 lines; center of a circle and a line
Parallel	Lines	Forces two straight lines to be parallel	
Perpendicular	Lines	Forces two straight lines to be perpendicular to each other	
Collinear	Lines	Forces two lines to lie on the same mathematical line or plane	
Grounded, Fixed, or Rigidified	Points, Lines	Forces lines or points not to move	
Tangent	Lines	Forces the 2 entities to touch such that they share exactly one point	A line tangent to an arc in an involute gear
Dimensions	Points, Lines, Arcs etc.	Forces various entities to maintain a certain values expressed in a chosen unit; dimensions may be marked as reference dimension by a REF or parenthesis mark	Angle between two lines; distance between point and line; fixed radius or arc length

=== Parametrics ===
More advanced 2D/3D CAD systems may allow application of mathematical relationships between constraints that help to save time on reshaping a model. By way of parametrics a complicated sketch can be adjusted in matters of seconds in predictable ways by only changing one or a few basic dimensions saving a fair amount of working time. Such systems are usually referred as parametric as they create parametric models. Parametrics may also be referred as a design intent, varying geometry, family tables, or as driving dimensions.

=== Assembly constraints ===
In assembly modeling, constraints are widely used to control or restrict design parts movements or relationships between each other. Some constraints forces models to respond to changes made in a separate part of a designed product. This enables the design to be responsive as a whole.

Various types of assembly contraints.
Type	Description
Dimension between two planes	Removes translational and 2 rotational DOF
Dimension between one plane and 1 straight edge	Removes one translational and one rotational DOF
Dimension between one plane and 1 point	Removes one translational DOF
Parallelism between two planes	Removes 2 rotation DOF; force planar faces to be parallel
Parallelism between two straight edges	
Perpendicularity between 2 planes	
Coincident and colinear straight edges	Forces two edges to slide along each other
Tangency between a curved face and a plane	Removes one translational DOF and one rotational DOF; allows the part instance with the curved surface to roll along the flat plane.
“Grounding” or “Rigidifying” one part relative to another	Forces constrained bodies to move as one rigid entity
Grounding or Rigidifying one part relative to a global origin	Removes all DOFs at once; locks to a global origin

== Implementations ==
Implementation of constraints functionality vary with given CAD system and may respond differently to how user applies them. When constraints are added into a sketch some system may be smart enough to apply additional ones based on pre-existing entities automatically. For instance, if the line is drawn next to another one the system may figure to constrain them into being in parallel relative to each other. This sometimes, however, may lead to unexpected results.

=== Geometric constraint solving ===
Constraint solver is a dedicated software that calculates positions of points of the 2D sketch based on geometric constraint specified by the user. The purpose of the constraint solver is to find all points' positions with respect to the said constraints. It also usually helps with identifying issues with constraining such as over-constraining etc. so the entire sketch is stable.

== Example ==
Ideally, a rod will need to be concentric to a hole drilled through the plate where it will be inserted, so the constraint "concentric" guarantees that the diameter of the rod and the diameter of the hole maintain a common centerline, thus "locking" the manner the rod relates to the hole in the plate; this means that the rod could still slide on either direction since the position of its ends has not been limited. Instance 2 illustrates that the rod may still rotate along its centerline while it slides up or down.

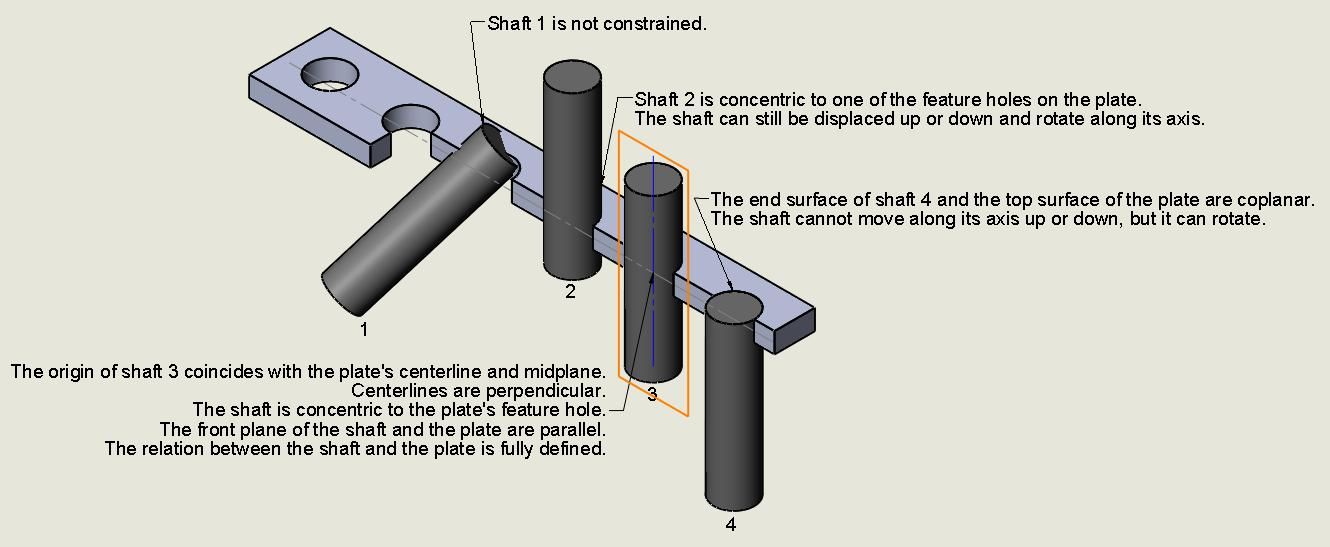
Concentric mating of cylinders, shafts, or rods to a plate.

== See also ==
- Constraint (classical mechanics)
- Geometric constraint solving
- Geometric dimensioning and tolerancing
- Parametric modeling
- Preliminary design & detailed design

== Sources ==
- Introducing AutoCAD 2010 and AutoCAD LT 2010 (pages 117-122), by George Omura. 2009; 1st. Edition. Wiley Publishing, Inc., Indianapolis, Indiana. ISBN 978-0-470-43867-1 Hard Cover; 384 pages.
- Autodesk® Inventor® 2011 Essentials Plus (pages 312-341), by Daniel T. Banach; Travis Jones; Alan J. Kalameja. 2011; Delmar/Cengage Learning, Autodesk Press. Printed in the United States of America. ISBN 978-1-1111-3527-0; ISBN 1-1111-3527-4. New York.
