= North–South Expressway =

North–South Expressway may refer to:

- North–South Expressway (Malaysia)
  - North–South Expressway Northern Route
  - North–South Expressway Central Link
  - North–South Expressway Southern Route
- North–South Corridor, Singapore, formerly named the North–South Expressway
- North–South Expressway East, running along the coast of Vietnam
- North–South Expressway West, running along western border of Vietnam

== See also ==
- North–South Corridor (disambiguation)
- North–South Motorway, in Australia
