= North–South line =

North–South line may refer to any of several different railway and metro lines:

== North–South line ==
- North-South Line (KTM Intercity), the West Coast Line in Malaysia
- North–South Line (Singapore), MRT line in Singapore
- North–South Line (Jakarta MRT), in Indonesia
- North/South line (Amsterdam metro), in the Netherlands
- NS Line, in Portland, Oregon, U.S.
- South Line, Tasmania, sometimes the North–South Line, in Tasmania
- North–South Rail Link, in Boston, Massachusetts, U.S.
- North–South line (Saudi Arabia), in Saudi Arabia
- Sydney Metro Western Sydney Airport, stage 1 of a proposed North South Rail Line in Sydney, Australia
- North–South connection, in Brussels, Belgium
- North–South Junction, in Wellington, New Zealand
- Blue Line (Kolkata Metro) (also known as North–South Metro) in India
- Red Line (MARTA) (formerly North–South line) in Georgia, U.S.
- The North-South route of the Gautrain linking Johannesburg and Pretoria in South Africa

== Namboku line ==
Namboku Line (南北線, Nanboku-sen; 'South North Line') may refer to any of several Japanese railway lines:

- Namboku Line (Osaka) (Kita–Osaka Kyuko Railway)
- Namboku Line (Kobe) (Kobe Rapid Railway)
- Namboku Line (Sapporo) (Sapporo Municipal Subway)
- Namboku Line (Sendai) in Sendai
- Namboku Line (Tokyo Metro)

== North–South railway ==
- North–South railway, in Germany
- North–South railway (Vietnam)
- North–South express railway, Vietnam
- North and South Railway, a failed planned American railroad
- North–South Commuter Railway, a planned commuter railway in the Philippines
- North–South Railway (Brazil)

== See also ==
- North–South Corridor (disambiguation)
- North–South Axis
- East–West line (disambiguation)
- Northeast Line (disambiguation)
- Central line (disambiguation)
