= Mainliner =

Mainliner or Mainliners may refer to:

- "Mainliner", a person who takes drugs intravenously
- "Mainliner", a person of the Mainline (Protestant)
- "Mainliner", a person who lives on the Philadelphia Main Line section of the Philadelphia suburbs
- "Mainliner", a generic name given to aircraft which flew the Mainline (flight) routes
- "Mainliner", a specific prefix name given to a number of aircraft operated by United Airlines and possibly others (ex. Mainliner New York, Mainliner Washington, etc.)

== In music ==
- "Mainliner", a member of The Bryn Mawr Mainliners Men's Barbershop Chorus
- "Mainliner", a member of Big Tom and The Mainliners, an Irish country music band
- Mainliner: Wreckage from the Past, a compilation album from the group Social Distortion
- "Mainliner (band)", is the name of one of the groups formed by Japanese underground musician Asahito Nanjo
- "Mainliner" is the name of a song by the grindcore group Brutal Truth from their 1994 album Need to Control.

== Other ==
- Mainliner (racehorse), racehorse that won the 1951 Hambletoninan harness race

== See also ==
Mainline (disambiguation)
