= Trunkline =

A trunkline or trunk line may refer to:

- A natural gas or oil line using pipeline transport
  - Trunkline LNG, a liquid natural gas plant in Lake Charles, Louisiana
  - Trunkline Pipeline, a pipeline that runs from Texas and Louisiana to Illinois and Indiana
- Trunking trunkline, a main telecommunications link such as a phone line directly connecting exchanges or switchboards at a considerable distance apart
- A main transportation link such as:
  - A main line (railway)
  - The rail line on Norway Trunk Line
  - A component of the Michigan State Trunkline Highway System
  - Synonym for trunk carrier, a type of airline regulated by the Civil Aeronautics Board of the United States until 1978

== See also ==
- Main line (disambiguation)
- Central line (disambiguation)
- Trunk (disambiguation)
- Line (disambiguation)
