= North–South Corridor (West Bengal) =

Indian road project

North-South Corridor is a direct communication project with North Bengal along with Haldia Port of West Bengal's sea port. Under this project, State Road 4 and State Road 7. To increase the communication of Haldia port with neighboring countries like Nepal-Bhutan-Bangladesh, the country's northeast will have to widen the SH4 and SH7. That's why ADB will provide ₹4500 crore (70 percent of total project cost) to the state. State administration sources said, for this purpose, it will take 271 hectares of land initially. West Bengal Highway Development Corporation or West Bengal Road Development Corporation has been entrusted to the land.null ADB experts are making plans for the development of the road, the DPR, or the roadmap of the road construction. Experts from Kharagpur IIT will see the projects report.
