= Chennai Central–Mysuru main line =

Railway line in India

The Mysuru main line is a railway line that connects Chennai in Tamil Nadu to Mysore in Karnataka, passing through Vellore and Bangalore. The line is completely electrified, allowing trains to reach a maximum permissible speed of approximately 130 km/h. Daily trains operating on this route include the Kaveri Express and the Mysore Shatabdi. Major junctions along this line include Arakkonam Junction, Katpadi Junction, and Bangalore City.

Both the Kaveri Express and the Shatabdi Express connect the state capitals of Tamil Nadu and Karnataka.
