= East–West line =

East–West line may refer to several rapid transit lines:

- East-West Line (Auckland), New Zealand
- East–West Line (Singapore), Singapore
- East-West Line, former name of the Blue Line (MARTA) in Georgia, United States
- Green Line (Kolkata Metro), also known as East–West Metro or East–West Corridor, in India
- Tōzai Line (東西線, Tōzai-sen; "East West Line" in Japanese) can refer to one of several Japanese railway lines:
  - JR Tōzai Line, operated by JR West mainly in Osaka Prefecture
  - Tōzai Line (Kobe), operated by Kobe Rapid Railway in Kobe, Hyogo Prefecture
  - Tōzai Line (Kyoto), operated by Kyoto Municipal Transportation Bureau in Kyoto
  - Tōzai Line (Sapporo), operated by the Sapporo City Transportation Bureau in Sapporo, Hokkaido
  - Tōzai Line (Tokyo Metro), operated by Tokyo Metro in Tokyo
  - Tōzai Line (Sendai), operated by the Sendai City Transportation Bureau in Sendai

== See also ==
- Busan Metro Line 2 or the Dongseo Line, an east-west rail line in Busan, South Korea
- Central line (disambiguation)
- Crossrail (disambiguation)
- "East West Corridor" or Tuen Ma line (includes former Ma On Shan line), the MTR line in Hong Kong
- East and West Junction Railway, a disused line in central England
- East-West Passenger Rail (Massachusetts), a proposed passenger rail corridor between Boston and Western Massachusetts, United States
- East West Rail, a rail line under construction in England between Oxford and Cambridge
- East-West Railway, a proposed line in Nepal
- North–South Line (disambiguation)
- Northeast Line (disambiguation)
