= Basic dimension =

In a technical drawing, a basic dimension is a theoretically exact dimension, given from a datum to a feature of interest. In Geometric dimensioning and tolerancing, basic dimensions are defined as a numerical value used to describe the theoretically exact size, profile, orientation or location of a feature or datum target.

Allowable variations from the theoretically exact geometry are indicated by feature control, notes, and tolerances on other non-basic dimensions.

Basic dimensions are currently denoted by enclosing the number of the dimension in a rectangle.

In earlier times, they were denoted by appending "BASIC" or "BSC" to the dimension

When features are located using BASIC dimensions by chain dimensioning, there is no accumulation of tolerance between features, because the dimensions refer to the theoretically perfect position of the feature, not the actual location of the feature within the range permitted by tolerances.

Basic dimensions, identified by the engineer, locate tolerance zones. Because that’s true, basic dimensions identify tolerance information located in feature control frames that state geometric tolerances. When an engineer makes a statement of tolerance, that statement is made in the form of a feature control frame.
