= Central line =

Central line or Central Line may refer to:

== Railway and metro lines ==
=== in English ===
- Central line (London Underground), England
- Central Line (Cape Town), in South Africa
- Central line (Mumbai Suburban Railway), in India
- Central Line (Sweden), between Sundsvall and Storlien
- Central Line (Tanzania), from Dar es Salaam to Kigoma
- Central Link, now the 1 Line, between Seattle and SeaTac, US
- Moscow Central Circle, in Russia

=== Other languages ===
- Busan Metro Line 1 or Jungang Line, South Korea
- Chūō Main Line ('Central Main Line'), between Tokyo and Nagoya in Japan
  - Chūō Line (Rapid), services on the eastern Chūō Main Line
  - Chūō Liner, now Hachiōji service
  - Chūō–Sōbu Line, local services
- Chūō Shinkansen ('Central Shinkansen'), between Tokyo and Osaka in Japan
- Chūō Line (Osaka), in Japan
- Jungang line ('Central line'), from Cheongnyangni in Seoul to Gyeongju, in South Korea
  - Gyeongui–Jungang Line, in Seoul, South Korea

== Other uses ==
- Central Line (band), a British band 1978–1984
- Central line (geometry), in the plane of a triangle
- Central line (medicine), or central venous catheter
- "Central Line", a song by Squarepusher (credited as the Duke of Harringay) on the album Alroy Road Tracks

== See also ==
- Center line (disambiguation)
- Central subway (disambiguation)
- North–South Line (disambiguation)
- East West Line (disambiguation)
- Main line (disambiguation)
- Trunkline (disambiguation)
- Central Artery, a section of freeway in Boston, Massachusetts, U.S.
- Jungang Expressway, an expressway in South Korea
