= Old Main Line =

Old Main Line may refer to:

- BCN Old Main Line, a canal network (and historic company name) in Birmingham, England
- BMT Lexington Avenue Line, he first standard elevated railway in Brooklyn, New York
- Old Main Line Subdivision of CSX Transportation (and formerly of the Baltimore and Ohio Railroad)
