= West Bengal Highway Development Corporation =

- Abbreviation: WBHDC
- Formation: 2012
- Type: Government Agency
- Legal status: Active
- Purpose: Development and maintenance of State Highways
- Headquarters: HRBC Bhawan, 4th & 5th Floor, Munshi Premchand Sarani, Kolkata 700021
- Region served: West Bengal
- Managing Director: B. P. Gopalika (IAS)
- Director (Admin): Dipankar Chowdhury
- Director (Finance): Shilpa Gourisaria (IAS)
- Chief General Manager: Prasanta Saha
- Main organ: Board of directors
- Parent organisation: Department of Public Works (West Bengal), Government of West Bengal
- Website: wbhdcl.gov.in

West Bengal Highway Development Corporation Limited (WBHDCL) is a state agency of the Government of West Bengal established in 2012, for development, implementation and construction of State Highways and other important roads in the state of West Bengal, India. It is under the administrative control of the Public Works Department, Government of West Bengal.
