= Shantipur =

- City
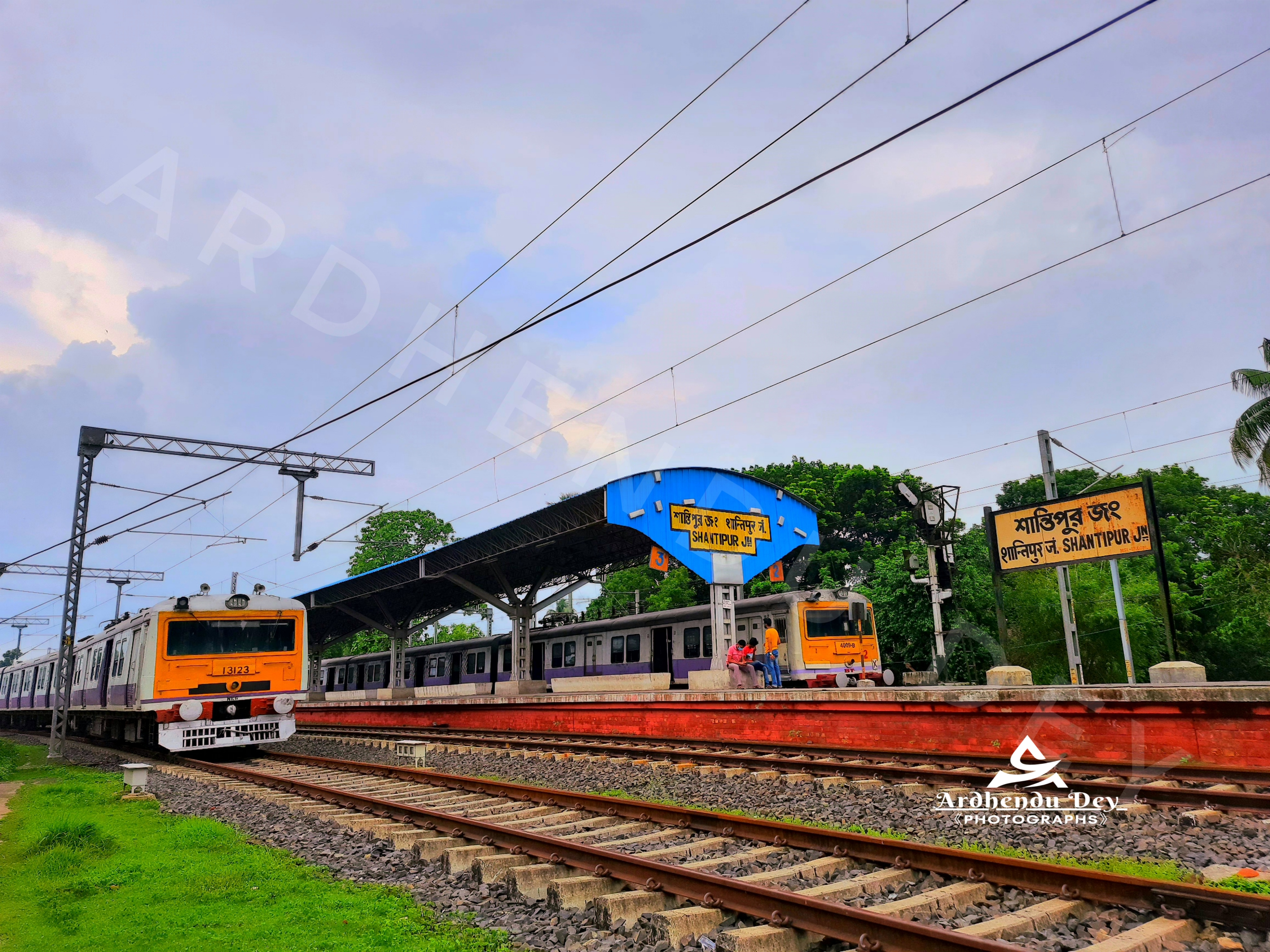

- Location in West Bengal, India Shantipur (India)
- Coordinates: 23.25°N 88.43°E
- Country: India
- State: West Bengal
- District: Nadia
- Established: 1853

Government
  - Type: Municipality
  - Body: Santipur Municipality
  - Chairperson: Subrata Ghosh

Area
  - City: 25.88 km^{2} (9.99 sq mi)
  - Rank: 2nd in Nadia District
- Elevation: 15 m (49 ft)

Population (2011)
  - City: 151,774
  - Rank: 2nd in Nadia District
  - Density: 5,865/km^{2} (15,190/sq mi)
  - Metro: 199,210

Languages
  - Official: Bengali, English
- Time zone: UTC+5:30 (IST)
- PIN: 741404
- Telephone code: 03472
- Lok Sabha constituency: Ranaghat
- Member of Parliament: Jaganath Sarkar (BJP)
- Vidhan Sabha constituency: 86-Santipur
- Member of Legislative Assembly: Swapan Kumar Das (BJP)
- Website: santipurmunicipality.org

Shantipur is a city and a municipality in the Ranaghat subdivision of Nadia district in the Indian state of West Bengal. The fort area of this city, also known as Daak-Garh (calling or gathering room) is thought to have been built by Raja Krishnachandra of Nadia.

== Geography ==
Cities and towns in Ranaghat subdivision of Nadia district
M: municipal town/ city/notified area, CT: census town, R: rural/ urban centre.
Owing to space constraints in the small map, the actual locations in a larger map may vary slightly

=== Location ===
Santipur is located at 23.25°N 88.43°E. It has an average elevation of 15 metres (49 feet).

Santipur is famous for handloom sarees from ancient times. After the partition of India, many weavers came from Dhaka of Bangladesh and started to reside here in Phulia region, which is a Panchayat area of Santipur.

=== Area overview ===
Nadia district is mostly alluvial plains lying to the east of Hooghly River, locally known as Bhagirathi. The alluvial plains are cut across by such distributaries as Jalangi, Churni and Ichhamati. With these rivers getting silted up, floods are a recurring feature. The Ranaghat subdivision has the Bhagirathi on the west, with Purba Bardhaman and Hooghly districts lying across the river. Topographically, Ranaghat subdivision is spread across the Krishnanagar-Santipur Plain, which occupies the central part of the district, and the Ranaghat-Chakdaha Plain, the low-lying area found in the south-eastern part of the district. The Churni separates the two plains. A portion of the east forms the boundary with Bangladesh. The lower portion of the east is covered by a portion of the North 24 Parganas district. The subdivision has achieved reasonably high urbanisation. 41.68% of the population lives in urban areas and 58.32% lives in rural areas.

Note: The map alongside presents some of the notable locations in the subdivision. All places marked in the map are linked in the larger full screen map. All the four subdivisions are presented with maps on the same scale – the size of the maps vary as per the area of the subdivision.

== Demographics ==
In the 2011 census, Santipur Urban Agglomeration had a population of 288,718, out of which 147,299 were males and 141,419 were females. The 0–6 years population was 24,006. Effective literacy rate for the 7+ population was 82.67 per cent.

The following municipality, notified area, outgrowths and census towns were part of Santipur Urban Agglomeration in 2011 census: Santipur (M), Taherpur (NA), Taherpur (OG), Barasat (OG), Bhaduri (OG), Mahisdanga (OG), Phulia (CT), Patuli (CT), Badkulla (CT), Ghoralia (CT), Beharia and Gangni.

As of 2001 India census, Santipur had a population of 138,195. Males constitute 51% of the population and females 49%. Santipur has an average literacy rate of 64%, higher than the national average of 59.5%: male literacy is 69%, and female literacy is 58%. In Shantipur, 12% of the population is under 6 years of age.

=== Religion ===
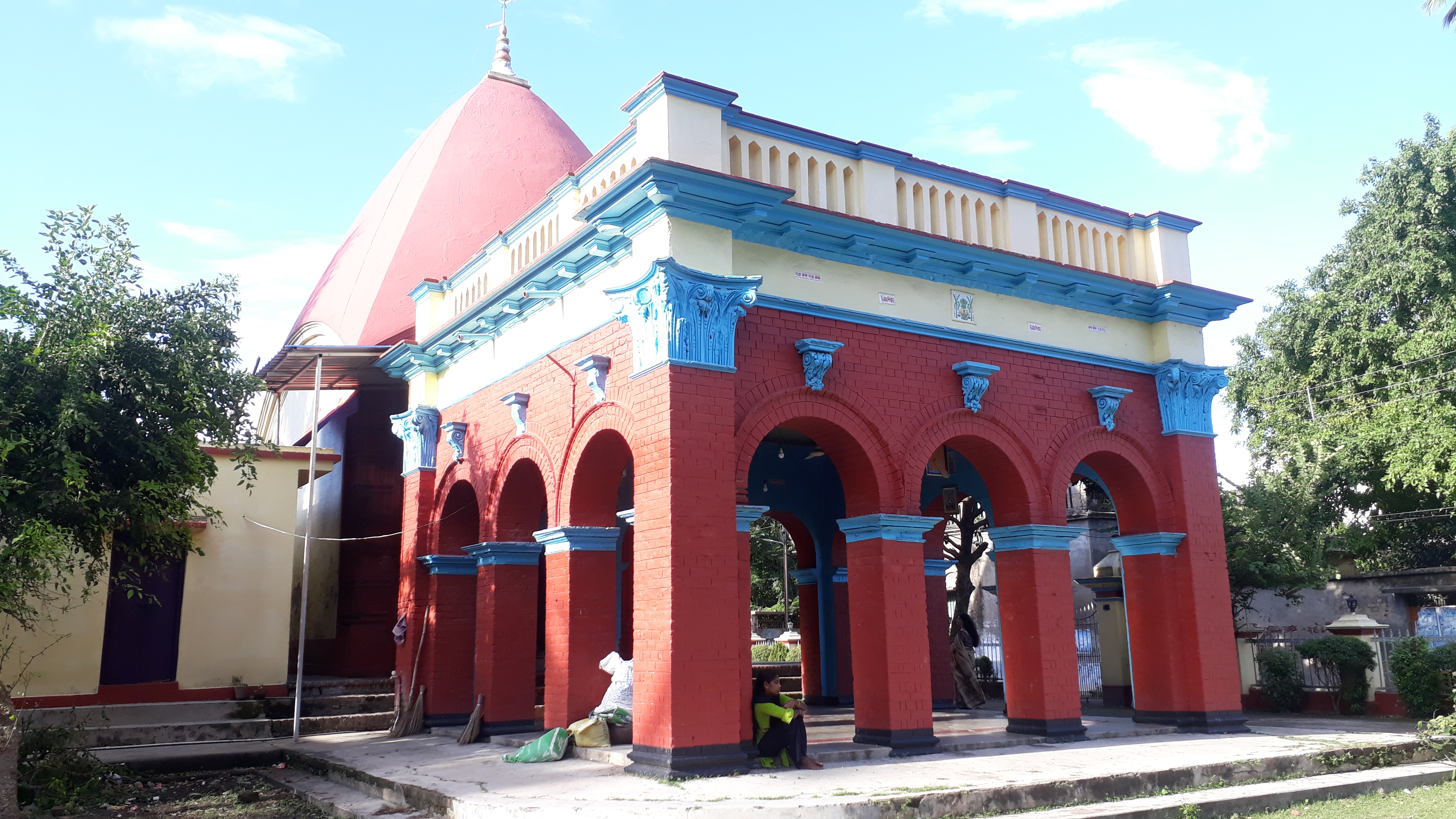
Jaleswar Temple at Shantipur

Hinduism is majority religion in Santipur city with 79.15% followers. Islam is second most popular religion in city of Santipur with approximately 20.25% following it. In Santipur city, Christianity is followed by 0.04%, Jainism by 0.01%, Sikhism by 0.02% and Buddhism by 0.01%. Around 0.42% stated Other Religion, approximately 0.11% stated No Particular Religion.

Religions of Shantipur (2011)
1. Hinduism (79.2%)
2. Islam (20.2%)
3. Christian (0.04%)
4. Sikhism (0.02%)
5. Buddhism (0.01%)
6. Jainism (0.01%)
7. Others (0.42%)
8. No Particular Religion (0.11%)

== Police station ==
Santipur police station has jurisdiction over Santipur municipality and Santipur CD Block. The total area covered by the police station is 111.945 km^{2} and the population covered is 493,717 (2001 census).

== Economy ==
Since ancient times, Santipur and the surrounding region has been famous for handloom saris (saree). The handloom weaving style unique to this region are famously known as Santipuri Sari (tant). After the partition of India, Bengal was split into two major regions. West Bengal became a part of India and East Bengal became East Pakistan (Bangladesh). Many skilled weavers from Dhaka, in current day Bangladesh, migrated into West Bengal and settled around the cities of Santipur and Kalna (Ambika Kalna) of Bardhaman district. Both are traditionally renowned centers for producing hand-woven fabrics sold throughout the country. Through government support for Indian handicrafts and arts, the weaving community slowly grew and thrived. Saris and finely woven feather-touch textiles are still being produced in the same traditional method today. One can find the patterns and colors found in ancient times still reflected in the garments produced in the vast textile belt of Shantipur, Phulia, Samudragarh, Dhatrigram and Ambika Kalna. Each center produces superb fabrics in its own variation of the Shantipuri style of weaving. Santipur is especially known for super-fine-weave dhotis and jacquards. These textiles are marketed through co-operatives and various commercial undertakings.

Most of the people in the Sutragarh area of Santipur are engaged in textile trade. There is a weaving cloth market's here. This market's is held two days a week on Sunday and Thursday from 4 am to 2 pm. People from nearby villages come to this market's to do business. From here the weaving cloth goes to different parts of the country and is also exported abroad. Weaving sari is also available at Station clothes market, Bara Bazar, various clothing stores in Santipur and various sari shops in Phulia.

Santipur's handmade saree's are famous. Santipur Handloom Innovation Producer Company Limited is one of major player in the industry. They use pure genuine Handmade Handloom material to create products which are often exported to foreign markets.

== Religious History ==
The old and historical town Santipur is famous for Ras Utsav and Dol utsav which is thought to have been initiated by Mathuresh Goswami, the great grandson of Advaita Acharya who was one of the main associates of Chaitanya Mahaprabhu.

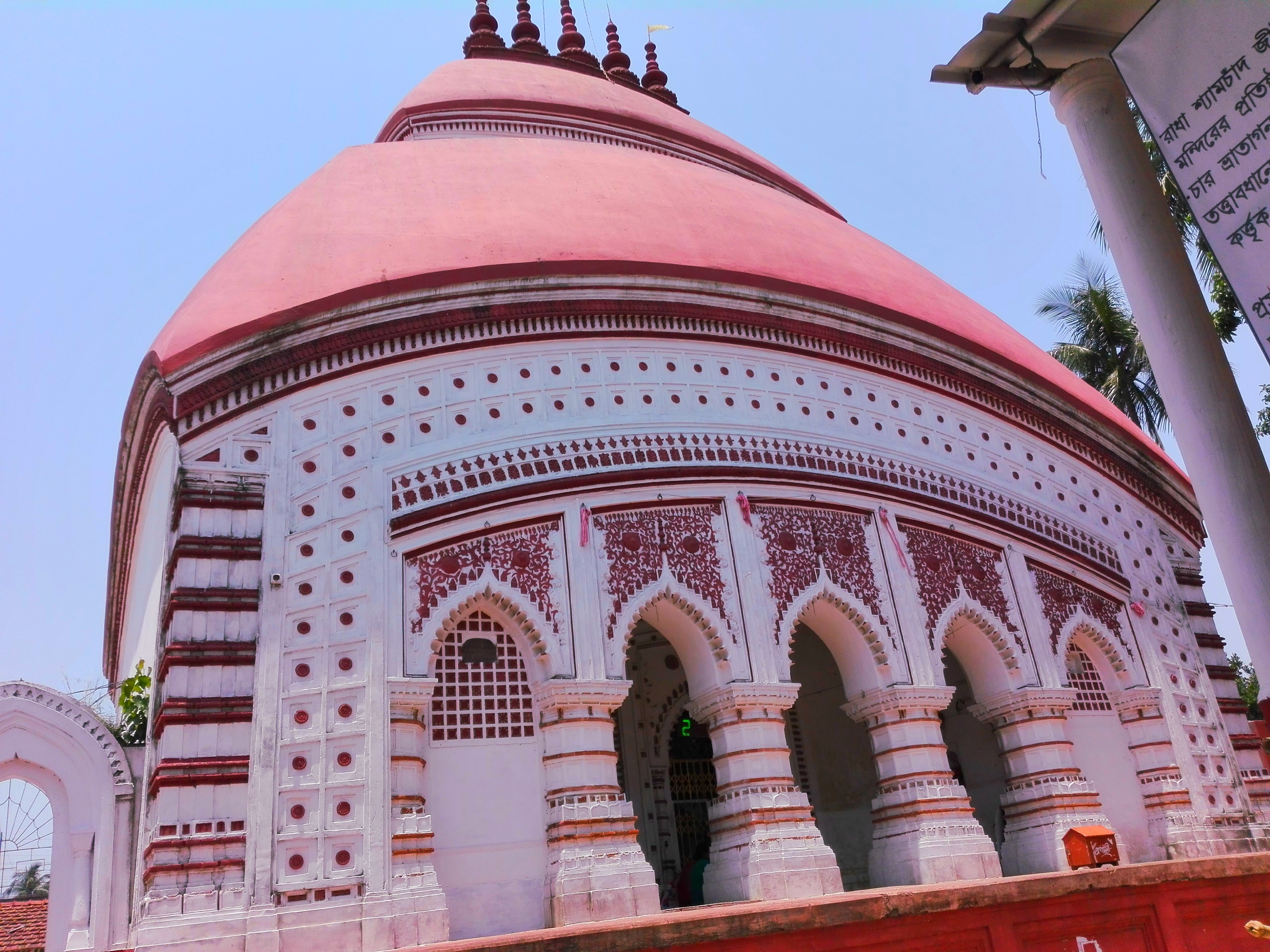
Shyamchand Mandir

The principle deity of the town is 'Radharaman' in the family of Baro Gosai descending from the lineage of Mathuresh Goswami. The deity was originally installed as a single statue of krishna named 'dol govinda' in Orissa by king indradyumna. When the king of Yessore (now in Bangladesh), Pratapaditya attacked Orissa, the priest of the temple gave away the deity to his own guru Mathuresh Goswami to protect it in times of emergency. He brought the idol to his ancestral home in Santipur where he reinstalled it in a new temple. A deity of Radha was later installed beside Dolgovinda and both of them renamed Radharaman.

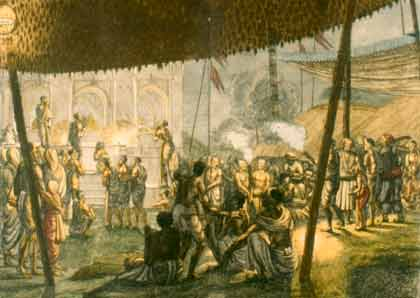
Rashyatra - celebrations of the Hindu God Krishna's followers.

The deity, believed to be worshipped by Advaita Acharya himself, is named Madan Gopal and is worshipped in the lineage of Krishna Mishra, the second son of Advaita Acharya.

On the day of Rashyatra, the main festival of the town, all of them are taken out in a grand procession around the city accompanied with drums, kirtan and other celebration. Curiously, all the thrones are lit with the age-old Belgium glass candleholders and chandeliers, instead of electric lighting, even to this day. This gives Rashotsav a very ancient and historical look. On this day, as a continuation of a tradition introduced by Bara Goswamis near about 250 years ago, a young girl, called Rai-Raja (Rai is another name for Radha and Raja means king), dressed in expensive attire and gold ornaments is seated in a throne and paraded across the city to be worshipped as Radha.

Kali Puja is another festival that the people of this place pays a lot of dedication.

There is a unique form of celebrating Kali worship in the form of hand painted image of the deity known as Pateshwari meaning drawing of the deity on a piece of cloth. The deity is worshiped for 3 days during the Rash Utsav. The second day of worship is marked by the sacrifice of a goat. It is then incorporated into the many festive meals and shared with the community until the festival ends. The Pateshwari Mandir is one of the oldest temples in Santipur, dating back to the 16th century, with such a painted canvas of Goddess Kali. RadhaGokulchand jou (Madhyam Goswami), RadhaMadangopal jou, Shyamchand Mandir, Chakfera Goswami bari (choto goswami), Atabunia Goswami bari (house of Sri Bijoy Krishna Goswami), Bansbunia goswami bari, Shyamrai jiu, Pagla Goswami bari etc. are situated in Shantipur.

The 500 year old Pateswari Mandir at Pateswari Street in Santipur is maintained by the Pramanik family trust worshipped at the night of Raas Purnima. More than 14 generations of Pramaniks - a close group of the Tili subcaste, stayed here before most of the family migrated to Calcutta. Notable names from this family include Sudhamoy Pramanick. The Prāmānik Bādi (house) is one of the oldest standing buildings in Santipur.

Kali Puja is another festival that the people of this place pays a lot of dedication. Some of the Kali Murtis present here, worshiping them started 500–600 years ago.

The Durga Puja of the Judge Pandit household of Shantipur is nearly four and a half centuries old. This Chattopadhyay family traces its lineage to Chaital Mahesh. At one time, they held zamindari estates in Yaduya village of Gaya. The thirteenth descendant of this family, Pitambar Chattopadhyay, was conferred the title of Tarkabagish during the British period. Owing to his profound scholarship in Hindu scriptures, he was honored with the title “Judge Pandit.” The family later settled in Shantipur. Shibani Bhattacharya Bandyopadhyay, the daughter-in-law from the maternal lineage of the Judge Pandit family, shares that the family’s daughter Nirmala Devi was married to Bholanath Bandyopadhyay—the poet of the elegiac work Ashru, a close friend of the renowned author Bibhutibhushan Bandyopadhyay. It was through Bholanath Bandyopadhyay that Bibhutibhushan Bandyopadhyay himself once visited the Durga Puja of this historic household.

Here Jagadhatri worship is celebrated. Jagadhatri puja is celebrated in the Sutragarh area of Santipur. Sutragarh's Jagadhatri Puja is estimated to be more than 350 years old. All Jagadhatri Pratimas are still worshiped in the name of King Krishnachandra in this place. Various gods and goddesses (Kali, Santoshi Mata, Bharat Mata, Durga, Komolekamini, Annapurna, Narayan, Nataraj and others) were held in the center of Jagadhatri worship here.

Jagadhatri Puja is held here for three days and after three days of worship, Pratima is Niranjan by performing a Luminous procession.

== Education ==
=== School ===
- Santipur Municipal High School
- Santipur Hindu High School
- Santipur Oriental Academy
- Sutragarh Maharaja of Nadia's High School
- Santipur Muslim High School
- Sutragrah Char Ramnagar Char Tustalal High School
- Sarat Kumari Girls High School
- Radharani Nari Siksha Mandir
- Sutragrah Girls High School
- Durgamani Girls High School
- Ravindra Vidyapith High School
- Tantubai Sangha High School
- Malancha High School
- Haripur High School

=== Colleges ===
- Santipur College
- Santipur B.Ed College

== Notable people ==
- Advaita Acharya
- Bijoy Krishna Goswami
- Sir Azizul Haque
- Mohammad Mozammel Huq
- Sudhamoy Pramanick
- Krittibas Ojha
- Jatindranath Sengupta
- Arun Chandra Guha
- Lakshmi Kanta Maitra

== Transport ==
Shantipur railway station is well connected by rail by EMU railway services running from Sealdah railway station (Main section).

It is also well connected with North and South Bengal by various State Transport Services. National Highway 12 (India) passed through the Santipur town. This is also connected to the district Burdawan (Kalna) and the district Hoogly (Guptipara) through the river Ganges (Hoogly).

Private Bus with connected Towns- Ranaghat, Krishnanagar, Habra, Thakurnagar, Gaighata, Kalyani, Chakdah, Baharampur etc.

== See also ==
- Advaita Acharya
- Sir Azizul Haque
- Sudhamoy Pramanick - Indian independence activist
- Diptendu Pramanick - Bengali film personality
- Mohammad Mozammel Huq
- Arindam Bhattacharya (politician) - Member of Legislative Assembly
