= Ghoralia =

- Census Town
- Location in West Bengal, India Ghoralia (India)
- Coordinates: 23.2433°N 88.4587°E
- Country: India
- State: West Bengal
- District: Nadia

Area
  - Total: 1.9508 km^{2} (0.7532 sq mi)

Population (2011)
  - Total: 5,268
  - Density: 2,700/km^{2} (6,994/sq mi)

Languages
  - Official: Bengali, English
- Time zone: UTC+5:30 (IST)
- PIN: 741404
- Telephone/STD code: 03454
- Lok Sabha constituency: Ranaghat
- Vidhan Sabha constituency: Santipur
- Website: nadia.gov.in

Ghoralia is a census town in the Santipur CD block in the Ranaghat subdivision of the Nadia district in the state of West Bengal, India.

== Geography ==
Cities and towns in Ranaghat subdivision of Nadia district
M: municipal town/ city/notified area, CT: census town, R: rural/ urban centre.
Owing to space constraints in the small map, the actual locations in a larger map may vary slightly

=== Location ===
Ghoralia is located at 23.2433°N 88.4587°E.

The map of Santipur CD block, in the District Census Handbook 2011, Nadia, shows Ghoralia and Beharia as adjacent census towns, between Shantipur and Phulia.

=== Area overview ===
Nadia district is mostly alluvial plains lying to the east of Hooghly River, locally known as Bhagirathi. The alluvial plains are cut across by such distributaries as Jalangi, Churni and Ichhamati. With these rivers getting silted up, floods are a recurring feature. The Ranaghat subdivision has the Bhagirathi on the west, with Purba Bardhaman and Hooghly districts lying across the river. Topographically, Ranaghat subdivision is spread across the Krishnanagar-Santipur Plain, which occupies the central part of the district, and the Ranaghat-Chakdaha Plain, the low-lying area found in the south-eastern part of the district. The Churni separates the two plains. A portion of the east forms the boundary with Bangladesh. The lower portion of the east is covered by a portion of the North 24 Parganas district. The subdivision has achieved reasonably high urbanisation. 41.68% of the population lives in urban areas and 58.32% lives in rural areas.

Note: The map alongside presents some of the notable locations in the subdivision. All places marked in the map are linked in the larger full screen map. All the four subdivisions are presented with maps on the same scale – the size of the maps vary as per the area of the subdivision.

== Demographics ==
According to the 2011 Census of India, Ghoralia had a total population of 5,268, of which 2,776 (53%) were males and 2,492 (47%) were females. Population in the age range 0–6 years was 441. The total number of literate persons in Ghoralia was 3,740 (77.48% of the population over 6 years).

The following municipality, notified area, outgrowths and census towns were part of Shantipur Urban Agglomeration in 2011 census: Shantipur (M), Taherpur (NA), Taherpur (OG), Barasat (OG), Bhaduri (OG), Mahisdanga (OG), Phulia (CT), Patuli (CT), Badkulla (CT), Ghoralia (CT), Beharia and Gangni.

== Infrastructure ==
According to the District Census Handbook 2011, Nadia, Ghoralia covered an area of 1.9508 km^{2}. Among the civic amenities, it had 12 km roads with open drains, the protected water supply involved hand pump, tube well, borewell. It had 523 domestic electric connections. Among the medical facilities, it had 1 maternity and child welfare centre, 1 mobile health clinic. Among the educational facilities it had 2 primary schools, 1 middle school, the nearest secondary, senior secondary schools at Shantipur 4 km away. An important item it produced was sari. It had the branch offices of 1 nationalised bank, 1 agricultural credit society.

== Transport ==
Bathna Krittibas railway station, a halt railway station of the Kolkata Suburban Railway system, on the Ranaghat-Shantipur branch line, is located nearby.

== Education ==
Santipur College was established at Santipur in 1948.

Ranaghat College was established at Ranaghat in 1950.

== Healthcare ==
Nabla (Fulia) Block Primary Health Centre, with 10 beds at Fulia Colony, is the major government medical facility in the Santipur CD block.

Santipur State General Hospital at Santipur functions with 131 beds.
