= Ranaghat subdivision =

Ranaghat
- Subdivision
- Coordinates: 23.18°N 88.58°E
- Country: India
- State: West Bengal
- District: Nadia
- Headquarters: Ranaghat

Government
  - Type: Office of Sub-divisional Officer
  - Sub-divisional Officer: Mohd Suboor Khan IAS

Area
  - Total: 893.58 km^{2} (345.01 sq mi)

Population (2011)
  - Total: 1,432,761
  - Density: 1,603.4/km^{2} (4,152.8/sq mi)

Languages
  - Official: Bengali, English
- Time zone: UTC+5:30 (IST)
- ISO 3166 code: ISO 3166-2:IN
- Vehicle registration: WB
- Website: www.ranaghat.org

Ranaghat Subdivision is an administrative subdivision located at Nadia district, in the state of West Bengal, India The subdivision is administered by SDM/SDO(Ranaghat).

== Overview ==
Nadia district is part of the large alluvial plain formed by the Ganges-Bhagirathi system. The plains spread southwards from the head of the delta. The Ranaghat subdivision has the Bhagirathi on the west, with Purba Bardhaman and Hooghly districts lying across the river. Topographically, Ranaghat subdivision is spread across the Krishnanagar-Santipur Plain, which occupies the central part of the district, and the Ranaghat-Chakdaha Plain, the low-lying area found in the south-eastern part of the district. The Churni separates the two plains. The area slopes southwards. A portion of the east forms the boundary with Bangladesh. The area had large forests. The huge influx of East Bengali refugees that took place in the district immediately after the partition of India and the steady influx ever since paved way for conversion of forest into agricultural land.

== Subdivisions ==
Nadia district is divided into the following administrative subdivisions:

Subdivision	Headquarters	Area km^{2}	Population (2011)	Rural population % (2011)	Urban population % (2011)
Tehatta	Tehatta	862.18	796,245	97.15	2.85
Krishnanagar Sadar	Krishnanagar	1,661.10	2,186,503	79.205	20.795
Ranaghat	Ranaghat	893.58	1,432,761	58.32	41.68
Kalyani	Kalyani	526.57	891,563	23.27	76.73
Nadia district	Krishnanagar	3,927.00	5,307,072	66.86	33.14

Cities and towns in Ranaghat subdivision of Nadia district
M: municipal town/ city/notified area, CT: census town, R: rural/ urban centre.
Owing to space constraints in the small map, the actual locations in a larger map may vary slightly

== Administrative units ==
Ranaghat subdivision has 6 police stations, 4 community development blocks, 4 panchayat samitis, 47 gram panchayats, 327 mouzas, 293 inhabited villages 3 municipalities, 2 notified areas, 23 census towns and 5 outgrowth. The municipalities are: Ranaghat, Santipur and Birnagar. The notified areas are: Taherpur and Cooper's Camp. The census towns are: Nrisinghapur, Harinadibhastsala, Ghoralia, Beharia, Phulia, Bagula, Badkulla, Patuli, Gangni, Kamgachhi, Raghabpur, Panpara, Aistala, Satigachha, Anulia, Gopalpur, Parbbatipur, Halalpur Krishnapur, Hijuli, Ranaghat (CT), Nasra, Gangnapur and Belgharia. Outgrowths around Ranaghat are: Taherpur (Ward No. 14), Barasat (Ward No, 15), Bhaduri (Ward No. 16), Mahisdanga (Ward No.17) and Magurkhali (Ward No. 13).

The subdivision has its headquarters at Ranaghat.

== Police stations ==
Police stations in Ranaghat subdivision have the following features and jurisdiction:

Police station	Area covered km^{2}	India-Bangladesh border km	Municipal town	CD Block
Shantipur	111.945	-	Shantipur	Santipur
Hanskhali	229	25	-	Hanskhali
Ranaghat, Taherpur	250+154.74	-	Ranaghat, Birnagar, Taherpur	Ranaghat I
Dhantala, Gangnapur	206+102	12	Cooper's Camp	Ranaghat II

== Blocks ==
Community development blocks in Ranaghat subdivision are:

CD Block	Headquarters	Area km^{2}	Population (2011)	SC %	ST %	Hindus %	Muslims %	Literacy rate %	Census Towns
Santipur	Phulia	171.41	241,080	41.29	1.32	86.45	11.85	73.10	5
Hanskhali	Hanskhali	246.29	293,040	49.17	2.86	87.98	11.39	80.11	3
Ranaghat I	Habibpur	145.53	232,282	36.56	1.91	93.82	5.67	77.61	9
Ranaghat II	Nokari	279.03	368,681	47.39	4.39	85.65	12.59	79.38	6

== Gram Panchayats ==
The subdivision contains 47 gram panchayats under 4 community development blocks:

Hanskhali block consists of 13 gram panchayats, viz. Bagula;I, Betna Gobindapur, Mamjoan, Ramnagar Barachupria;I, Bagula;II, Dakshinpara&;I, Mayurhat;I, Batkulla;I, Dakshinpara;II, Mayurhat;II, Ramnagar Barachupria;II, Batkulla;II and Gajna.

Santipur block consists of ten gram panchayats, viz. Arbandi–I, Baganchra, Fulia Township, Nabla, Arbandi–II, Belgoria–I, Gayeshpur, Babla, Belgoria–II and Haripur.

Ranaghat I block consists of ten gram panchayats, viz. Anulia, Kalinarayanpur Paharpur, Nawpara Masunda, Ramnagar–II, Barasat, Payradanga, Tarapur, Habibpur, Khisma and Ramnagar–I.

Ranaghat II block consists of 14 gram panchayats, viz. Anishmali, Baidyapur–II, Kamalpur, Raghunathpur Hijuli–II, Aranghata, Debagram, Majhergram, Bahirgachi, Duttafulia, Nokari, Raghunathpur Hijuli–I, Baidyapur–I, Jugalkishore and Shyamnagar.

== Education ==
Nadia district had a literacy rate of 74.97% as per the provisional figures of the census of India 2011. Tehatta subdivision had a literacy rate of 67.25%, Krishnanagar Sadar subdivision 71.03%, Ranaghat subdivision 79.51% and Kalyani subdivision 83.35%.

Given in the table below (data in numbers) is a comprehensive picture of the education scenario in Nadia district for the year 2013-14:

Subdivision	Primary School		Middle School		High School		Higher Secondary School		General College, Univ		Technical / Professional Instt		Non-formal Education	
Subdivision	Institution	Student	Institution	Student	Institution	Student	Institution	Student	Institution	Student	Institution	Student	Institution	Student
Tehatta	424	35,755	27	3,746	12	9,223	53	85,338	2	9,556	7	705	1,321	49,314
Krishnanagar Sadar	1,066	106,019	82	14,710	39	22,754	160	222,437	9	26,970	24	3,265	2,836	106,868
Ranaghat	707	57,335	45	4,494	39	20,958	106	147,018	4	22,678	4	326	2,000	58,835
Kalyani	428	32,856	28	2,594	15	7,160	86	95,192	4	15477	27	12,522	1,160	22,331
Nadia district	2,625	231,965	182	25,544	105	60,695	405	549,985	19	74,771	62	16,548	7,317	237,348

Note: Primary schools include junior basic schools; middle schools, high schools and higher secondary schools include madrasahs; technical schools include junior technical schools, junior government polytechnics, industrial technical institutes, industrial training centres, nursing training institutes etc.; technical and professional colleges include engineering colleges, medical colleges, para-medical institutes, management colleges, teachers training and nursing training colleges, law colleges, art colleges, music colleges etc. Special and non-formal education centres include sishu siksha kendras, madhyamik siksha kendras, centres of Rabindra mukta vidyalaya, recognised Sanskrit tols, institutions for the blind and other handicapped persons, Anganwadi centres, reformatory schools etc.

The following institutions are located in Ranaghat subdivision:

- Ranaghat College was established at Ranaghat in 1950. Affiliated to the University of Kalyani, it offers undergraduate courses in arts, science and commerce. It has facilities for teaching MA in Bengali.
- Santipur College was established at Santipur in 1948. It came up with the initiative of Pandit Lakshmi Kanta Maitra. Affiliated to the University of Kalyani, it offers honours courses in Bengali, English, Sanskrit, history, philosophy, political science, physics, chemistry, mathematics, botany, accountancy and computer applications.
- Pritilata Waddedar Mahavidyalaya was established at Panikhali in 2007. It was founded as a women's college but later became co-educational. It is a government aided general degree college.
- Srikrishna College was established at Bagula in 1952.Affiliated to the University of Kalyani, it offers honours courses in Bengali, English, Sanskrit, history, geography, political science, philosophy, economics, education, physics, Computer science, chemistry, mathematics and accountancy.

== Healthcare ==
The table below (all data in numbers) presents an overview of the medical facilities available and patients treated in the hospitals, health centres and sub-centres in 2014 in Nadia district.

Subdivision	Health & Family Welfare Deptt, WB				Other State Govt Deptts	Local bodies	Central Govt Deptts / PSUs	NGO / Private Nursing Homes	Total	Total Number of Beds	Total Number of Doctors*	Indoor Patients	Outdoor Patients
Subdivision	Hospitals	Rural Hospitals	Block Primary Health Centres	Primary Health Centres	Other State Govt Deptts	Local bodies	Central Govt Deptts / PSUs	NGO / Private Nursing Homes	Total	Total Number of Beds	Total Number of Doctors*	Indoor Patients	Outdoor Patients
Tehatta	1	1	2	7	-	-	-	6	17	405	36	36,811	1,035,750
Krishnanagar Sadar	3	4	3	20	2	16	1	31	80	2,386	113	165,867	2,304,887
Ranaghat	2	1	2	15	1	8	-	21	50	780	104	58,507	1,426,852
Kalyani	4	1	-	7	1	5	-	25	43	1,863	226	90,327	1,272,701
Nadia district	10	7	7	49	4	29	1	83	190	5,434	479	351,512	6,040,190

.* Excluding nursing homes

=== Medical facilities ===
Medical facilities in Ranaghat subdivision are as follows:

Hospitals in Ranaghat subdivision: (Name, location, beds)
Ranaghat Subdivisional Hospital, Anulia, 171 beds
Santipur State General Hospital, Santipur, 131 beds
Coopers' P.L. Home and Hospital, Cooper's Camp, 30 beds

Rural Hospitals: (Name, block, location, beds)
Bagula Rural Hospital, Hanskhali CD Block, Bagula, 30 beds
Habibpur (Jadhav Dutta) Rural Hospital, Ranaghat I CD Block, Habibpur, 30 beds
Aranghata Rural Hospital, Ranaghat II CD Block, Aranghata, 30 beds

Block Primary Health Centres: (Name, CD block, location, beds)
Nabla (Fulia) Block Primary Health Centre, Santipur CD Block, Fulia Colony, 10 beds

Primary Health Centres (CD Block-wise)(CD Block, PHC location, beds)
Santipur CD Block: Arbandhi (10 beds), Baganchora (10 beds), Gayeshpur (10 beds)
Hanskhali CD Block: Badkulla (10 beds), Ramnagar (6 beds), Hanskhali (6 beds), Dakshinpara (10 beds)
Ranaghat I CD Block: Paschim Noapara Bhabasundari (10 beds), Paharpur (6 beds), Taherpur (6 beds).
Ranaghat II CD Block: Duttapulia (10 beds), Gangnapur (4 beds), Kamalpur (4 beds), Gangsara (4 beds)

== Electoral constituencies ==
Lok Sabha (parliamentary) and Vidhan Sabha (state assembly) constituencies in Ranaghat subdivision were as follows:

Lok Sabha constituency	Reservation	Vidhan Sabha constituency	Reservation	CD Block and/or Gram panchayats and/or municipal areas
Ranaghat	Reserved for SC	Krishnaganj	Reserved for SC	Krishnaganj* community development block, and Badkulla-I, Badkulla-II, Betna Gobindapur, Dakshin Para I, Dakshin Para II, Gajna, Mayurhat I and Mayurhat II gram panchayats of Hanskhali CD Block
		Nabadwip	None	Nabadwip municipality*, Nabadwip* CD Block, and Bhaluka and Joania GPs of Krishnanagar I* CD Block
				.* Krishnaganj, Nabadwip and Krishnanagar I are in Krishnanagar Sadar subdivision
		Santipur	None	Shantipur municipality, and Babla, Baganchra, Belgoria I, Belgoria II Gayeshpur and Haripur GPs of Santipur CD Block
		Ranaghat Uttar Paschim	None	Ranaghat municipality, Taherpur notified area, Birnagar municipality, and Ramnagar I, Barasat, Kalinarayanpur-Paharpur and Khisma GPs of Ranaghat I CD Block, and Arbandi I, and Arbandi II GPs of Santipur CD Block, and Fulia Township
		Ranaghat Dakshin	Reserved for SC	Anishmali, Baidyapur I, Baidyapur II, Debagram, Majher Gram, Nokari, Raghunathpur Hijuli I and Shyamnagar GPs of Ranaghat II CD Block, Anulia, Habibpur, Nawpara Masunda, Payradanga, Ramnagar II and Tarapur GPs of Ranaghat I CD Block and Cooper's Camp notified area.
		Ranaghhat Uttar Purba	Reserved for SC	Aranghata, Bahirgachhi, Duttapulia, Jugalkishore, Kamalpur and Raghunathpur Hijuli II gram panchayats of Ranaghat II CD Block, and Bagula I, Bagula II, Mamjoan, Ramnagar Bara Chupria I and Ramnagar Bara Chupria II GPs of Hanskhali CD Block
		Chakdaha**	None	Chakdaha municipality, and Chanduria I, Dubra, Ghetugachhi, Rautari, Silinda I, Silinda II, Tatla I and Tatla II gram panchayats of Chakdaha CD Block
		.** Chakdaha is in Kalyani subdivision		
