= Phulia =

Phulia Fulia
- Census Town
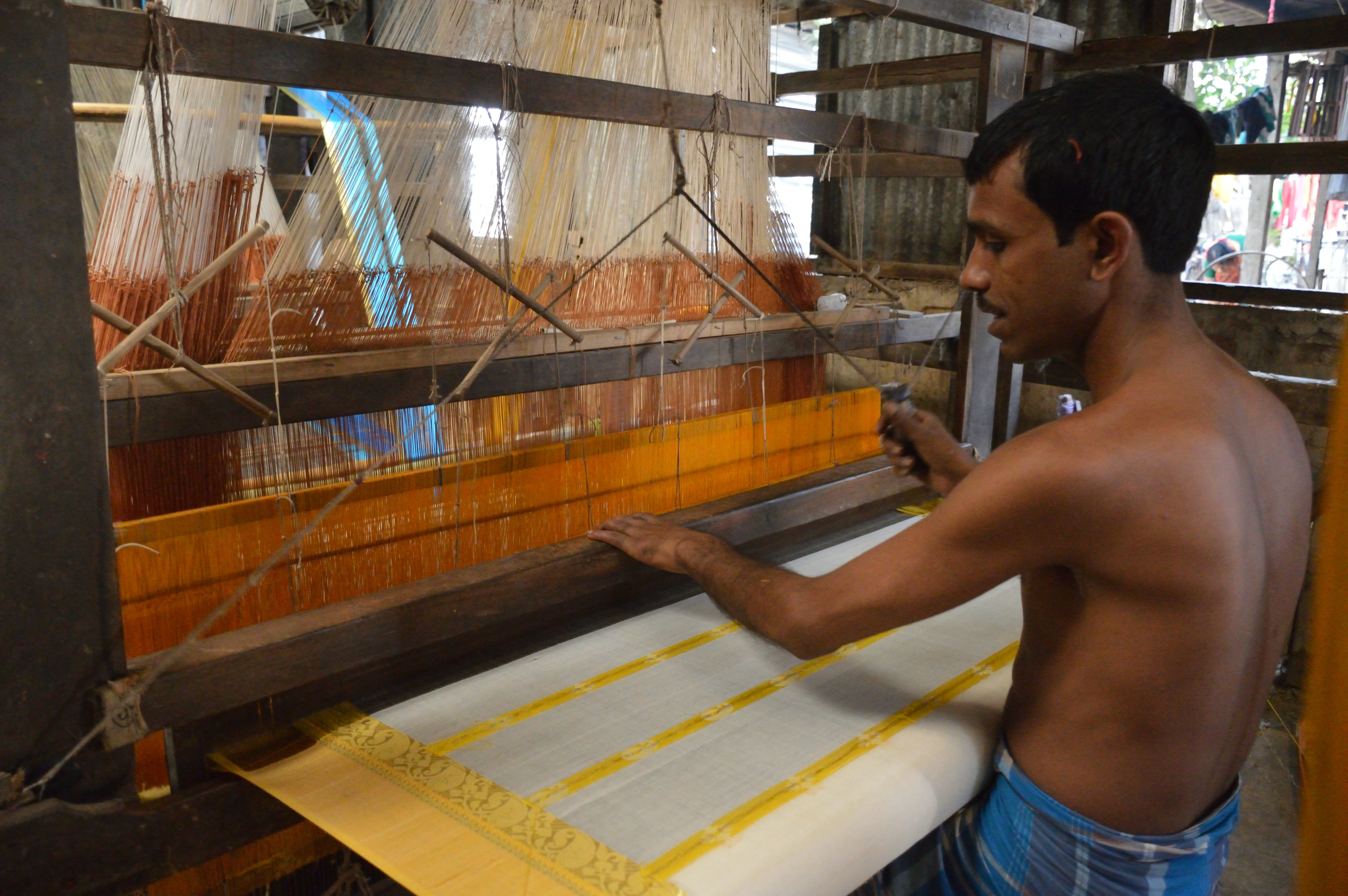
- Weaving a tant sari at Phulia

- Location in West Bengal, India Phulia (India)
- Coordinates: 23.2344°N 88.5062°E
- Country: India
- State: West Bengal
- District: Nadia

Area
  - Total: 15.02 km^{2} (5.80 sq mi)

Population (2011)
  - Total: 55,653
  - Density: 3,705/km^{2} (9,597/sq mi)

Languages
  - Official: Bengali, English
- Time zone: UTC+5:30 (IST)
- PIN: 741402
- ISO 3166 code: IN-WB
- Vehicle registration: WB
- Lok Sabha constituency: Ranaghat
- Vidhan Sabha constituency: Ranaghat Uttar Paschim
- Website: wb.gov.in

Phulia (also spelled Fulia) is a census town in the Santipur CD block of the Ranaghat subdivision in the Nadia district in the Indian state of West Bengal. It is birthplace of 'Adi kavi' of Bengal Krittibas Ojha.

== Geography ==
Cities and towns in Ranaghat subdivision of Nadia district
M: municipal town/ city/notified area, CT: census town, R: rural/ urban centre.
Owing to space constraints in the small map, the actual locations in a larger map may vary slightly

=== Location ===
Fulia is located at 23.2344°N 88.5062°E.

=== Area overview ===
Nadia district is mostly alluvial plains lying to the east of Hooghly River, locally known as Bhagirathi. The alluvial plains are cut across by such distributaries as Jalangi, Churni and Ichhamati. With these rivers getting silted up, floods are a recurring feature. The Ranaghat subdivision has the Bhagirathi on the west, with Purba Bardhaman and Hooghly districts lying across the river. Topographically, Ranaghat subdivision is spread across the Krishnanagar-Santipur Plain, which occupies the central part of the district, and the Ranaghat-Chakdaha Plain, the low-lying area found in the south-eastern part of the district. The Churni separates the two plains. A portion of the east forms the boundary with Bangladesh. The lower portion of the east is covered by a portion of the North 24 Parganas district. The subdivision has achieved reasonably high urbanisation. 41.68% of the population lives in urban areas and 58.32% lives in rural areas.

Note: The map alongside presents some of the notable locations in the subdivision. All places marked in the map are linked in the larger full screen map. All the four subdivisions are presented with maps on the same scale – the size of the maps vary as per the area of the subdivision.

== Civic administration ==
=== CD block HQ ===
The headquarters of Santipur CD block are located at Buincha, as per Nadia District Census Handbook 2011. On page 422 in the Santipur CD Block map, Buincha is shown as part of Phulia census town. According to the district administration, the Block Development Office is located at PO Fulia Colony.

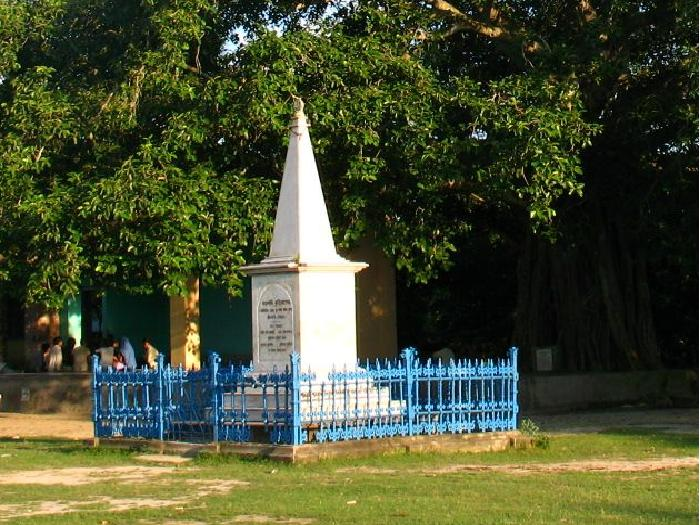
Krittibas Memorial

== Infrastructure ==
According to the District Census Handbook 2011, Nadia, Phulia covered an area of 15.02 km^{2}. Among the civic amenities, the protected water supply involved tap water from untreated sources, tube well, borewell. It had 3,200 domestic electric connections, 360 road light points. Among the medical facilities, the nearest dispensary/ health centre was 2 km away. Among the educational facilities it had 18 primary schools, 3 secondary schools, 3 senior secondary schools. It had 1 polytechnic, 2 recognised short-hand, type writing and vocational training institutes and 13 non-formal education centres (Sarva Shikhsha Abhiyan). Among the social, recreational and cultural facilities, it had 1 cinema theatre, 2 auditorium/ community halls, 2 public libraries, 2 reading rooms. Three important items it produced were handloom sari, ghee, poultry products. It had branch offices of 1 nationalised bank, 1 private commercial bank, 1 agricultural credit society, 7 non-agricultural credit societies.

== Economy ==
After partition of India, many skilled weavers of Dhaka came and settled in West Bengal around Shantipur in Nadia district and Ambika Kalna of Bardhaman district, both traditionally renowned centres for hand-woven fabrics. With government encouragement and support, the talented weavers soon revived their ancestral occupation and the art of exquisite weaving once again flourished. Today, finely woven feather-touch textiles and saris in exotic designs and colours are being produced in the vast weaving belt of Shantipur, Phulia, Samudragarh, Dhatrigram and Ambika Kalna—each centre producing superb fabrics in its own unique weaving style. Dhatrigram produces jacquards and jamdanis while Kalna is famous for tangails and gorgeous jamdanis. Phulia and Samudragarh specialize in a combination of jacquard and jamdani work which are based on Tangail Saree Culture of Bangladesh while Santipur is known for superfine dhotis and jacquards. The produce is marketed through some whole sellers & co-operatives and various undertakings. But nowadays, the main problem in making the handicraft is the rising price of raw materials and inadequate supply of skilled labour (mainly from Cooch Behar district of West Bengal and Assam region). So, the economy based on Tant Saree is a diminishing economy and the next generation is not so much interested in this crafts. The weavers need some economic and administrative supports from the Government.

== Transport ==
Phulia railway station is a railway station of the Kolkata Suburban Railway system and operated by Eastern Railway. It is situated beside National Highway 12 at Chatkatala, Phulia on the Ranaghat–Shantipur line in Nadia district in the Indian state of West Bengal.The distance between Sealdah to Phulia railway station is approximately 89 km.

== Demographics ==
According to the 2011 Census of India, Phulia had a total population of 55,653, of which 28,695 (52%) were males and 26,958 (48%) were females. Population in the age range 0–6 years was 4,676. The total number of literate persons in Phulia was 41,752 (81.90% of the population over 6 years).

The following municipality, notified area, outgrowths and census towns were part of Shantipur Urban Agglomeration in 2011 census: Shantipur (M), Taherpur (NA), Taherpur (OG), Barasat (OG), Bhaduri (OG), Mahisdanga (OG), Phulia (CT), Patuli (CT), Badkulla (CT), Ghoralia (CT), Beharia and Gangni.

As of 2001 India census, Phulia had a population of 50,254. Males constitute 52% of the population and females 48%. Phulia has an average literacy rate of 68%, higher than the national average of 59.5%: male literacy is 74%, and female literacy is 62%. In Phulia, 11% of the population is under 6 years of age.

== Education ==
There are many schools and institutes in this region, some of the schools are listed below.

- Fulia Sikshaniketan High School
- Fulia Vidya Mandir High School
- Fulia Balika Vidyalaya
- Fulia Kritibas Smriti Vidyalaya

Training institutes are listed below.

- Indian Institute of Handloom Technology, Fulia
- Industrial Training Institute (ITI), Fulia
- Agricultural Training Centre, Fulia

== Personalities ==
Kabi Krittibas Ojha (15th century poet), who wrote the Ramayana in Bengali (Krittivasi Ramayan) used to live here.

== Healthcare ==
Nabla (Fulia) Block Primary Health Centre, with 10 beds at Fulia Colony, is the major government medical facility in the Santipur CD block.
