= Badkulla railway station =

Railway station in West Bengal, India

Badkulla
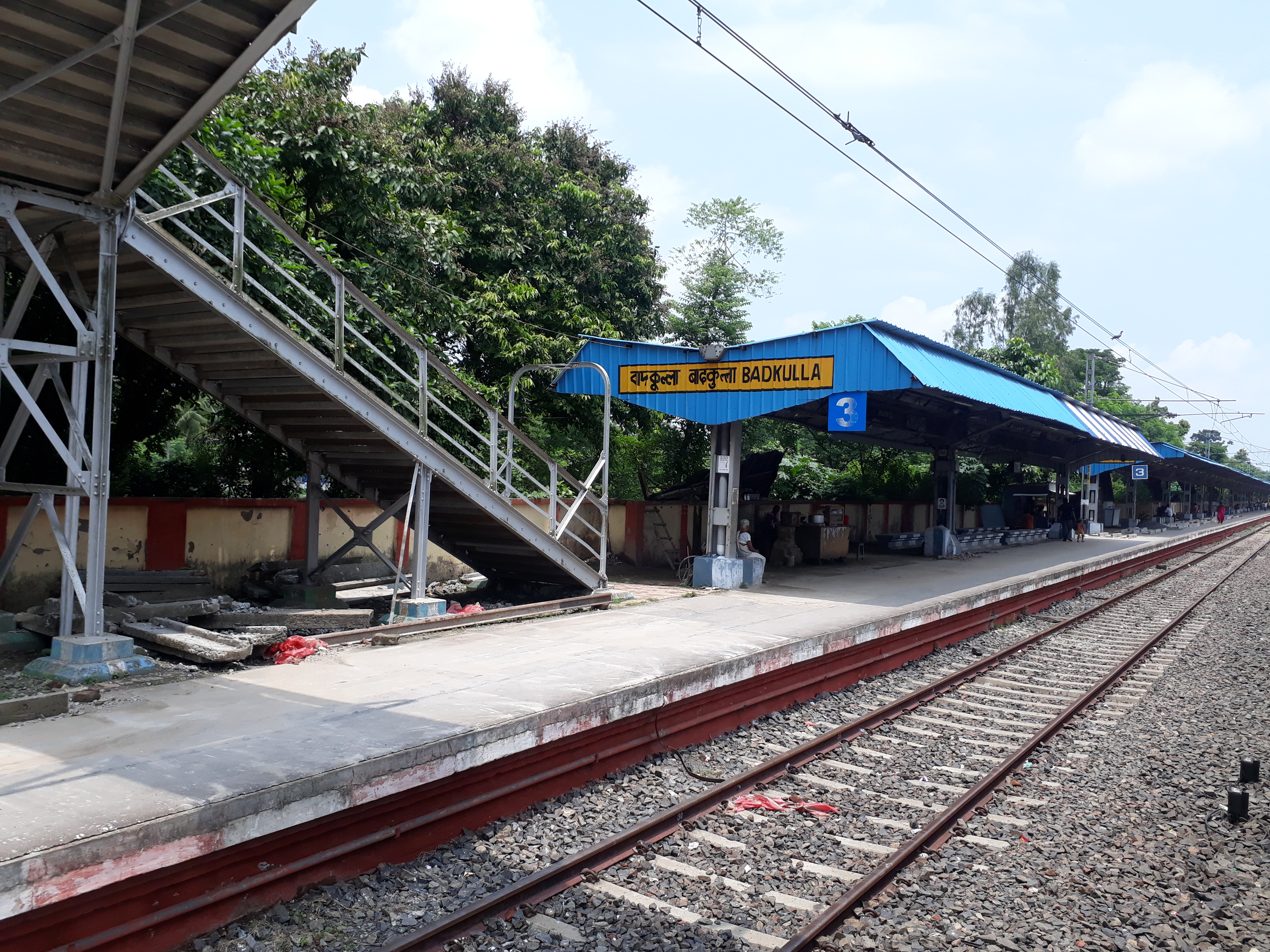
- Badkulla railway station

General information
- Location: Badkulla, Nadia, West Bengal; India
- Coordinates: 23.305743°N 88.526157°E
- System: Kolkata Suburban Railway
- Owner: Indian Railways
- Operator: Eastern Railway
- Line: Ranaghat–Krishnanagar line of Kolkata Suburban Railway
- Platforms: 3
- Tracks: 3

Construction
- Structure type: At grade
- Parking: Not available
- Cycle facilities: Not available
- Accessible: Not available

Other information
- Status: Functional
- Station code: BDZ
- Zone(s): Eastern Railway
- Division(s): Sealdah

History
- Opened: 1905
- Electrified: 1965

Services
Preceding station	Kolkata Suburban Railway	Following station
Taherpur towards Sealdah	Eastern Line Ranaghat–Krishnanagar line	Jalal Khali Halt towards Krishnanagar City Junction
Route map
Location
- Location within West Bengal Location within India

Badkulla railway station is a railway station of the Kolkata Suburban Railway system and operated by Eastern Railway. It is located at Badkulla on the Ranaghat–Krishnanagar line in Nadia in the Indian state of West Bengal.

== Track layout ==
Badkulla station has three tracks and one side platforms and two Island platform. These platforms are connected by foot overbridge.

== See also ==
- North 24 Parganas district
- Indian Railways
- Sealdah
- Sealdah–Hasnabad–Bangaon–Ranaghat line
- Lalgola and Gede branch lines
- Bangaon Junction
- Lalgola
- Transport in West Bengal
- List of railway stations in India
