= Gangni =

- Census Town
- Location in West Bengal, India Gangni (India)
- Coordinates: 23.2955°N 88.5298°E
- Country: India
- State: West Bengal
- District: Nadia

Area
  - Total: 1.6122 km^{2} (0.6225 sq mi)

Population (2011)
  - Total: 5,532
  - Density: 3,431/km^{2} (8,887/sq mi)

Languages
  - Official: Bengali, English
- Time zone: UTC+5:30 (IST)
- PIN: 741121
- Telephone/STD code: 03454
- Lok Sabha constituency: Ranaghat
- Vidhan Sabha constituency: Ranaghat Uttar Paschim
- Website: nadia.gov.in

Gangni is a census town in the Ranaghat I CD block in the Ranaghat subdivision of the Nadia district in the state of West Bengal, India.

== Geography ==
Cities and towns in Ranaghat subdivision of Nadia district
M: municipal town/ city/notified area, CT: census town, R: rural/ urban centre.
Owing to space constraints in the small map, the actual locations in a larger map may vary slightly

=== Location ===
Gangni is located at 23.2955°N 88.5298°E.

=== Area overview ===
Nadia district is mostly alluvial plains lying to the east of Hooghly River, locally known as Bhagirathi. The alluvial plains are cut across by such distributaries as Jalangi, Churni and Ichhamati. With these rivers getting silted up, floods are a recurring feature. The Ranaghat subdivision has the Bhagirathi on the west, with Purba Bardhaman and Hooghly districts lying across the river. Topographically, Ranaghat subdivision is spread across the Krishnanagar-Santipur Plain, which occupies the central part of the district, and the Ranaghat-Chakdaha Plain, the low-lying area found in the south-eastern part of the district. The Churni separates the two plains. A portion of the east forms the boundary with Bangladesh. The lower portion of the east is covered by a portion of the North 24 Parganas district. The subdivision has achieved reasonably high urbanisation. 41.68% of the population lives in urban areas and 58.32% lives in rural areas.

Note: The map alongside presents some of the notable locations in the subdivision. All places marked in the map are linked in the larger full screen map. All the four subdivisions are presented with maps on the same scale – the size of the maps vary as per the area of the subdivision.

== Demographics ==
According to the 2011 Census of India, Gangni had a total population of 5,532, of which 2,780 (50%) were males and 2,752 (50%) were females. Population in the age range 0–6 years was 493. The total number of literate persons in Gangni was 3,960 (78.59% of the population over 6 years).

The following municipality, notified area, outgrowths and census towns were part of Shantipur Urban Agglomeration in 2011 census: Shantipur (M), Taherpur (NA), Taherpur (OG), Barasat (OG), Bhaduri (OG), Mahisdanga (OG), Phulia (CT), Patuli (CT), Badkulla (CT), Ghoralia (CT), Beharia and Gangni.

== Infrastructure ==
According to the District Census Handbook 2011, Nadia, Gangni covered an area of 1.6122 km^{2}. Among the civic amenities, the protected water supply involved tap water from untreated sources, tube well, borewell. It had 850 domestic electric connections. Among the medical facilities, it had 1 dispensary/ health centre, 1 veterinary hospital. Among the educational facilities it had 2 primary schools, 1 middle school, 1 secondary school, 1 senior secondary school. It had branch office of 1 nationalised bank.

== Education ==
Anjangarh High School is a Bengali-medium coeducational institution established in 1968. The school has facilities for teaching from class V to class XII. It has a library with 2,000 books and 14 computers.
