= Anjana River =

River in West Bengal, India

- Native name: অঞ্জনা (Bengali)

Location
- Country: India
- State: West Bengal
- Cities: Krishnanagar and Badkulla

Physical characteristics
- Source: Jalangi
  - location: Ruipukur Mauza, Krishnanagar
  - coordinates: 23.4198212°N 88.4809413°E
  - elevation: 14 m (46 ft)
- Mouth: Churni
  - location: Byaspur Mauza
  - coordinates: 23.2822852°N 88.5824759°E
- Length: 29 km (18 mi)
- Basin size: 89.54 km^{2} (34.57 sq mi)
- Discharge
  - location: Byaspur

Anjana is a local river of Nadia district of West Bengal. The 29 km (18 mi) long river drains Krishnanagar, Jalalkhali and Badkulla areas, which belong to Krishnanagar, and Krishnanagar 1 and Hanshkhali community development block. The Anjana River originates on the southern bank of the Jalangi River at the northern end of Krishnanagar, the river generally flows south through the Jalalkhali area before reaching Badkulla. Passing the town of Badkulla, the river flows southeast and joins the Churni river. A tributary originates from this river at Hat Boalia, which joins the Churni river at Hanshkhali.

The course of the river has become a canal within the city of Krishnanagar, thus drying up most of the course. The river has very little flow in seasons other than monsoon. The river has been gradually silted up under the pressure of unplanned and illegal urbanization for a long time in Krishnanagar.

The description of this river is found in Rennell's 'Systematic Survey' in 1776 AD. Anjana River is also mentioned in Bengali literature.

== History ==
=== 15th and 16th centuries ===
Between the 15th and 16th centuries, the main flow of the Ganges began to flow from the Bhagirathi river bed to the Padma river bed. During this period the Jalangi river arose from the Padma, and connected the Padma with the Bhagirathi. As a result, it is assumed that the Anjana River originated as a tributary of the Jalangi River between the 15th and 16th centuries.

=== 18th and 19th centuries ===
Indigo cultivation across the Bengal began in the 18th century. Nadia district was established as the main center of indigo cultivation. Nadia district had more than 8 thousand indigo factories, which is one-fifth of the whole of Bengal. Many indigo factories were established on the banks of Anjana river including Krishnanagar town. Indigo plants are collected from the fields and transported to the indigo factory through the Anjana river. The water required for the factory was supplied from the river. Furthermore, near Badkulla in its left bank, one of the Zamindars of the district, Gagan Chandra Biswas had established his palace, and had built a ghat. Using the river for transport, in order to oversee his zamindari.

== Course ==
The Bhagirathi River channel near Nabadwip is less deep than the Jalangi river channel, so the water level of Jalangi is lower than the Bhagirthi river level near the estuary of Jalangi in Nabadwip. As a result, the Jalangi water does not flow into the Bhagirathi, and returns to the riverbed. This excess water begins to flow anew into the low-lying areas along the river, forming the Anjana as a tributary of the Jalangir.

Anjana is a 29 km (18 mi) long moribund river in the Bhagirathi-Hooghly basin. The river is simultaneously a distributary of the Jalangi river and a tributary of the Churni river. The Anjana River originates from the Jalangi river at Ruipukur Mauza near Krishnanagar. The river reaches Dogachi after crossing 7 km in Krishnanagar town. Krishnanagar city's Cathedral Church, Shaktinagar Hospital and Raja Krishnachandra's Rajbari are located on the banks of the river. The Anjana River covers a course of 11 kilometers (6.8 miles) from its source to Hat Boalia. The river divides into two tributaries near Hat Boalia. The main stream flows southward, crosses Joypur village and Jalalkhali and Jalkar Patuli, and reaches Badkulla town. Flowing at the western end of Badkulla town, it turns eastwards and enters Badkulla town. The river flows southeast from Badkulla town. It crosses the Chandanpukur and joins the Churni river near Byaspur Mauza.

Another part is known as Hele khal, which is 13 kilometers (8.1 miles) long. It passes through Hat Boalia to Jatrapur, Joypur, Gobindpur and Itaberia, and joins the Churni river near Hanskhali.

== Geography and drainage basin ==
The Anjana river basin covers an area of 89.54 km^{2} (34.57 sq mi), which is a river basin between the Jalangi and the Churni River. The entire basin belongs to Nadia district. The basin extends to Joypur in the east and Jalalkhali in the west, Byaspur in the south, Hanshkhali, Gobindpur and Itaberia in the east and Ruipukur in the north. The slope of river basin is observed from northwest to southeast.

32.27 percent area of the basin is located at 9–12 meters above sea level. Anjana river flows at an altitude of more than 16 meters above sea level in Krishnanagar city and Badkulla area, which is the highest basin area of the river basin. The lowest area of the basin is less than 9 meters above sea level.

The Anjana river is 29 km (18 mi) long, with an average depth of 3.92 m (12.9 ft). The maximum and minimum depth of the river is 6.08 and 0.75 m (19.9 and 2.5 ft) respectively. Maximum depth is observed in rural areas and minimum depth in urban areas. The river's maximum width is seen south of Purba Badkulla, 22 km (14 m) downstream from its source, where the river is 155 m (509 ft) wide.

== Geology ==
The entire river basin is part of the Ganges Delta. This delta was formed as part of the Bengal basin. The Anjana river basin area is mainly composed of alluvium deposited by the Ganges-Bhagirathi-Hooghly river system. The subterranean bedrock of the entire river basin is composed of the Ranaghat Formation. Sandstone, limestone and shale are observed in Ranaghat Formation.

== Popular culture ==
- Anjana river was referred in a poem of Sahaj Path, by Rabindranath Tagore.
- The name was noted in Ek Gaye, another poem of Rabindranath
- Poet Kazi Nazrul Islam mentioned the name of Anjana river in his song Nadir Naam Soi Anjana.
- The river was referred in a play of Bidhayak Bhattacharya named Tahar Naamti Ranjana.
