= Patuli (disambiguation) =

Patuli refers to a village in Purba Bardhaman district, West Bengal, India

It also refers to:

- Patuli, Nadia, a census town in Nadia district, West Bengal, India
- Baishnabghata Patuli Township, a neighbourhood in Kolkata
- Khandvi (food), Gujarati/ Maharashtrian food/ snack also known as Patuli
