= Taherpur =

- Town
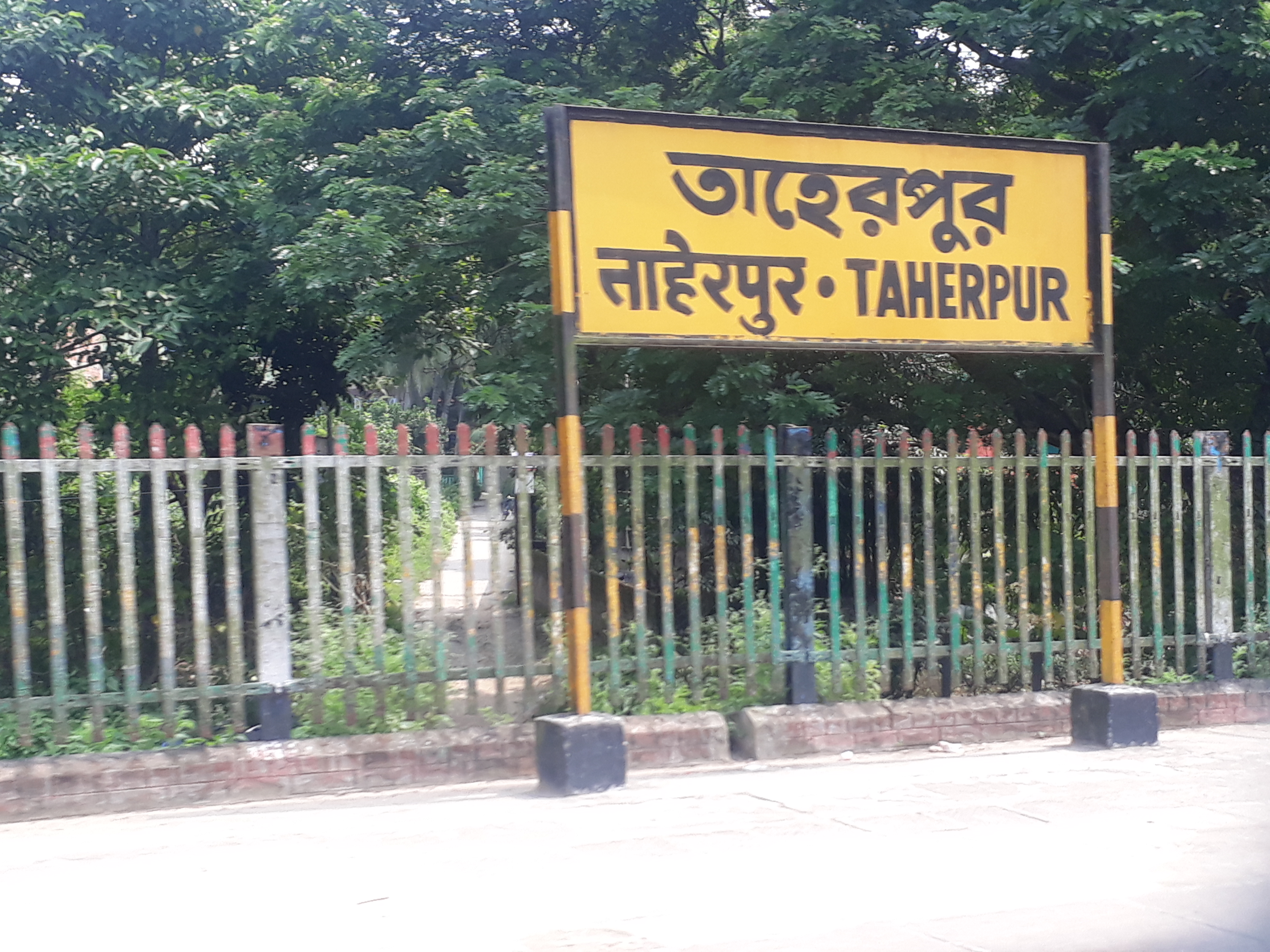
- Taherpur railway station

- Location in West Bengal, India Taherpur (India)
- Coordinates: 23.2665°N 88.5358°E
- Country: India
- State: West Bengal
- District: Nadia

Government
  - Type: Notified Area
  - Body: Taherpur Municipality
  - Chairman: Uttamananda Das (CPI(M))

Area
  - Town: 2.01 km^{2} (0.78 sq mi)

Population (2011)
  - Town: 20,894
  - Density: 10,400/km^{2} (26,900/sq mi)
  - Metro: 38,039

Languages
  - Official: Bengali, English
- Time zone: UTC+5:30 (IST)
- ISO 3166 code: IN-WB
- Vehicle registration: WB
- Lok Sabha constituency: Ranaghat
- Vidhan Sabha constituency: Ranaghat Uttar Paschim
- Website: nadia.gov.in

Taherpur is a town and a notified area in Ranaghat subdivision of Nadia district in the Indian state of West Bengal.

== History ==
=== Zamindars of Tahirpur ===
Taherpur has been named after a certain Pathan fief-holder Tahir Khan. Kamdev Bhatta, a Brahmin of shandilya gotra defeated the Pathan fief-holder Tahir Khan and laid the foundation of the Taherpur zamindari during the independent Sultanate period (1338-1538) of Bengal. Kamdev descendant Raja Kangshanarayan of Taherpur organized the first grand autumn Durga Puja in Bengal.

=== Kamdev Bhatta ===
This Raj family from Bhatta Narayan to the immediate predecessor of Kamdev Bhatta used to cultivate religious philosophy and literature over the ages. But Kamdev Bhatta was a man of different nature. In spite of studying religious philosophy, he became skilled in shooting arrow, using sword and wrestling. Later he united anumber of youths and made them expert in physical exercise and weapon training. Kamdev Bhatta had the credit of organising a group of youths and in course of time these youths became a fighting force in the region. At that time, a man named Tahir Khan ruled that region. After his name the Pargana was named as Tahirpur. Utilizing the weakness of Tahir Khan, Kamdev Bhatta attacked him with his organized force and after defeating him occupied the whole of Tahirpur region. He got the approval of the then reigning emperor of Delhi.

== Geography ==
Cities and towns in Ranaghat subdivision of Nadia district
M: municipal town/ city/notified area, CT: census town, R: rural/ urban centre.
Owing to space constraints in the small map, the actual locations in a larger map may vary slightly. All the four subdivisions are presented with maps on the same scale – the size of the maps vary as per the area of the subdivision.

=== Location ===
Taherpur is located at 23.2665°N 88.5358°E.

=== Area overview ===
Nadia district is mostly alluvial plains lying to the east of Hooghly River, locally known as Bhagirathi. The alluvial plains are cut across by such distributaries as Jalangi, Churni and Ichhamati. With these rivers getting silted up, floods are a recurring feature. The Ranaghat subdivision has the Bhagirathi on the west, with Purba Bardhaman and Hooghly districts lying across the river. Topographically, Ranaghat subdivision is spread across the Krishnanagar-Santipur Plain, which occupies the central part of the district, and the Ranaghat-Chakdaha Plain, the low-lying area found in the south-eastern part of the district. The Churni separates the two plains. A portion of the east forms the boundary with Bangladesh. The lower portion of the east is covered by a portion of the North 24 Parganas district. The subdivision has achieved reasonably high urbanisation. 41.68% of the population lives in urban areas and 58.32% lives in rural areas.

== Transport ==
Taherpur is well connected with district headquarters and Kolkata by road. Taherpur railway station is situated on the Ranaghat–Krishnanagar line.

== Civic administration ==
=== Police station ===
Rananghat and Taherpur police stations have jurisdiction over Ranaghat, Birnagar, Taherpur and Ranaghat I CD block. The total area covered by the Taherpur police station is 154.74 km^{2} and the population covered is 173,926 (2001 census).

== Demographics ==
According to the 2011 Census of India, Taherpur (Notified Area + Out Growth) had a total population of 38,039, of which 19,410 (51%) were males and 18,629 (49%) were females. Population in the age range 0–6 years was 3,200. The total number of literate persons in Taherpur was 30,166 (86.59% of the population over 6 years).

The following municipality, notified area, outgrowths and census towns were part of Shantipur Urban Agglomeration in 2011 census: Shantipur (M), Taherpur (NA), Taherpur (OG), Barasat (OG), Bhaduri (OG), Mahisdanga (OG), Phulia (CT), Patuli (CT), Badkulla (CT), Ghoralia (CT), Beharia and Gangni.

As of 2001 India census, Taherpur had a population of 20,060. Males constitute 51% of the population and females 49%. Taherpur has an average literacy rate of 80%, higher than the national average of 59.5%: male literacy is 84%, and female literacy is 76%. In Taherpur, 9% of the population is under 6 years of age.
