= Badkulla =

- Census Town
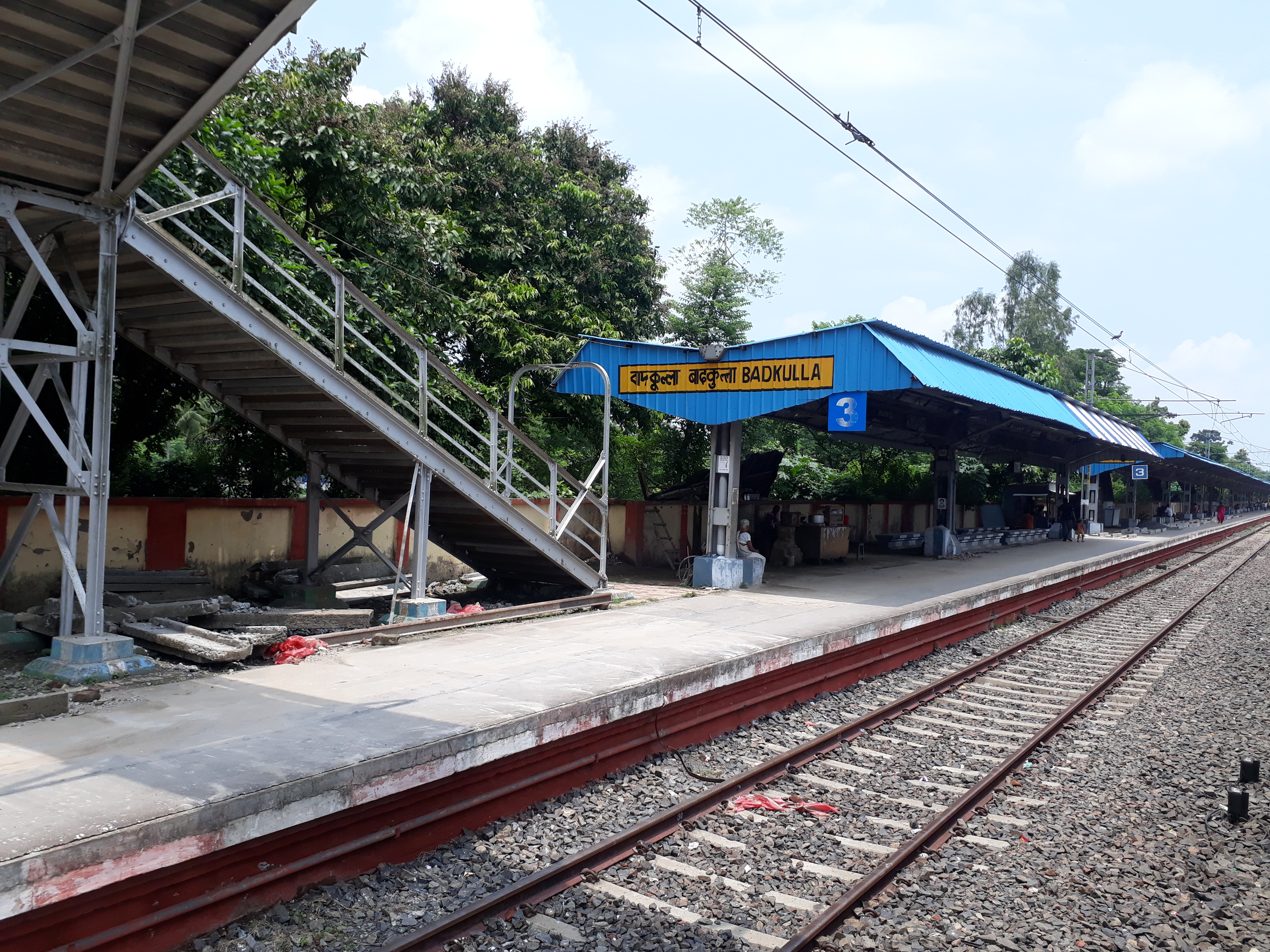
- Badkulla Railway Station

- Location in West Bengal, India Badkulla (India)
- Coordinates: 23.3036°N 88.5302°E
- Country: India
- State: West Bengal
- District: Nadia
- Elevation: 9 m (30 ft)

Population (2011)
  - Total: 18,051

Languages
  - Official: Bengali, English
- Time zone: UTC+5:30 (IST)
- PIN: 741121
- Telephone code: 03473
- Vehicle registration: WB
- Sex ratio: 1:1 ♂/♀
- Lok Sabha constituency: Ranaghat
- Vidhan Sabha constituency: Krishnaganj

Badkulla is a census town in the Hanskhali CD block in the Ranaghat subdivision of the Nadia district in the Indian state of West Bengal.

== Geography ==
Cities and towns in Ranaghat subdivision of Nadia district
M: municipal town/ city/notified area, CT: census town, R: rural/ urban centre.
Owing to space constraints in the small map, the actual locations in a larger map may vary slightly

=== Location ===
Badkulla is located at 23.3036°N 88.5302°E. It has an average elevation of 9 metres (30 feet).

The Anjana river has gone through Badkulla. Though at present, it can hardly be recognized as a river due to immense pollution and population. But it is believed that once the great poet Rabindranath Tagore had come and wrote a poem about the Anjana river and a temple beside it. That temple can still be found beside the Anjana river.

=== Area overview ===
Nadia district is mostly alluvial plains lying to the east of Hooghly River, locally known as Bhagirathi. The alluvial plains are cut across by such distributaries as Jalangi, Churni and Ichhamati. With these rivers getting silted up, floods are a recurring feature. The Ranaghat subdivision has the Bhagirathi on the west, with Purba Bardhaman and Hooghly districts lying across the river. Topographically, Ranaghat subdivision is spread across the Krishnanagar-Santipur Plain, which occupies the central part of the district, and the Ranaghat-Chakdaha Plain, the low-lying area found in the south-eastern part of the district. The Churni separates the two plains. A portion of the east forms the boundary with Bangladesh. The lower portion of the east is covered by a portion of the North 24 Parganas district. The subdivision has achieved reasonably high urbanisation. 41.68% of the population lives in urban areas and 58.32% lives in rural areas.

Note: The map alongside presents some of the notable locations in the subdivision. All places marked in the map are linked in the larger full screen map. All the four subdivisions are presented with maps on the same scale – the size of the maps vary as per the area of the subdivision.

== Demographics ==
As per the 2011 Census of India, Badkulla had a total population of 18,051, of which 9,140 (51%) were males and 8,911 (49%) were females. Population below 6 years was 1,497. The total number of literates in Badkulla was 14,264 (86.17% of the population over 6 years).

The following municipality, notified area, outgrowths and census towns were part of Shantipur Urban Agglomeration in 2011 census: Shantipur (M), Taherpur (NA), Taherpur (OG), Barasat (OG), Bhaduri (OG), Mahisdanga (OG), Phulia (CT), Patuli (CT), Badkulla (CT), Ghoralia (CT), Beharia and Gangni.

== Infrastructure ==
According to the District Census Handbook 2011, Nadia, Badkulla covered an area of 4.8199 km^{2}. Among the civic amenities, the protected water supply involved tap water from untreated sources, tube well, borewell. It had 1,758 domestic electric connections. Among the medical facilities, the nearest dispensary/ health centre was 1 km away. Among the social, recreational and cultural facilities it had 1 public library and 1 reading room. Three important items it produced were paddy, wheat and jute. It had the branch offices of 1 private commercial bank, 1 cooperative bank, 1 agricultural credit society.

== Healthcare ==
There is a primary health centre at Badkulla, with 10 beds.
