= Jatindranath Sengupta =

Bengali poet (1887–1954)

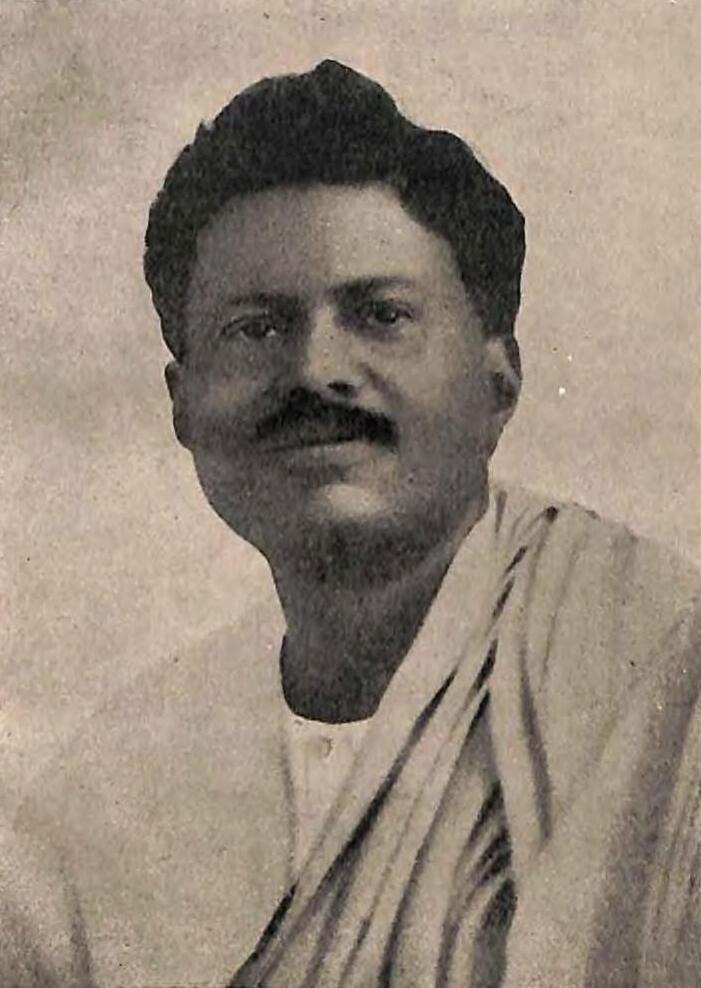
- Born: 26 June 1887; Patilpara, Purba Bardhaman district, West Bengal
- Died: 17 September 1954 (aged 74); Haripur Senpara Santipur Nadia West Bengal
- Occupation: Writer poetry
- Known for: Poet

Jatindranath Sengupta (or Yatīndranātha Senagupta) (26 June 1887 in Patilpara, Purba Bardhaman – 17 September 1954) was an Indian Bengali-language poet and writer.

== Birth ==
Jatindranath Sengupta was born on 26 June 1887 at Patilpara in Purba Bardhaman district, West Bengal at his maternal uncle's house. His ancestral village was Haripur, a village situated near Shantipur in Nadia district, West Bengal.

== Education and early life ==
Born to Dwarkanath Sengupta and Mohitkumari Devi, Jatindranath had his early education in his home village Haripur, about three miles away from Shantipur a seat of Vaishnav culture in the district of Nadia. Coming over to Kolkata he stayed with his Kaviraj uncle and passed the Entrance examination in 1903, the First Arts examination in 1905 (from the General Assembly's Institution, now Scottish Church College) and then graduated as a civil engineer from the Bengal Engineering College (now IIEST) at Shibpore, which was then affiliated with the University of Calcutta. In 1908 he was married to Jyotirlata Devi, the second daughter of Charuchandra Gupta, a practising lawyer in Hazaribagh (Jharkhand state). It was a rather poor family that the poet belonged to and his father Dwarkanath spent most of his active life as the Headmaster of a school at Patishar (now in Bangladesh) owned by the Tagore estate.

== Service life ==
For a few years he worked as the acting District Engineer of Nadia. He then had a bout of illness that left him jobless for nearly three years. An ardent believer in Gandhism he tried to make both ends meet by spinning yarns in Charkha and by producing home made match boxes with the help of unemployed village boys. It is needless to say that nothing worked. In 1923 he took up the job of the Estate Engineer in the Cossimbazar Raj Estate. He remained in the same post till his retirement in 1950.

== Literary characteristics ==
Jatindranath made his mark in Bengali literary scene in the twenties as a poet of rugged masculinity with a diction all of his own. His first three books Marichika (Mirage), Marushikha (the desert flame) and Marumaya (the desert illusion) established his fame as a poet of a new genre who rejected romanticism and any sublime imagination beyond the perception of senses. He thus tried to break away from the all pervasive influence of Tagore in Bengali poetry. His barbed comments on the romantic poets of the time and remarks on God, almost always satirical and sometimes irreveren earned him the label of an atheist and a pessimist. Scholars generally agree that the trio of Jatindranath Sengupta, Mohitlal Majumdar and Kazi Nazrul Islam heralded modernism in Bengali poetry. Both in form and content whether in his remarkably seamless juxtaposition of rustic expressions alongside richly Sankritized words or in metrical forms or in his perceived atheism, he left a strong influence on the immediate group of distinguished modern poets. From Sayam (dusk) onwards, his poems took a perceptible turn towards beauty, love and a pining for the youth, he once ridiculed. It also became clear that he was not really an atheist but his tirade against God was in reality a mental attitude, perhaps reflecting a love-hate relationship with a personal God whose benign face he wanted to see but could not. He wrote extensively on the poorer section of the society. These poems, in spite of the allegorical content, represent a broad humanism which unsurprisingly had seeds of feminism as well.

== Literary works ==
=== Verses ===
- Marichika (1923)
- Marushikha (1927)
- Marumaya (1930)
- Sayam (1941)
- Trijama (1948)
- Nishantika (1957, published posthumously)

=== Selected verses ===
- Anupurba (1946, 1954)
- Kavita Sankalan (ed. Sunil Kanti Sen, 1981)

=== Complete poetical works ===
- Kavya Sambhar (1966)
- Kavya Sangraha (ed. Sunil Kanti Sen, 2000)

=== Translations ===
- Kumarasamvaba (1942 the Kalidas epic)
- Gandhi Bani Kanika (1948, in verse form from a selection of Gandhiji's sayings)
- Rathi O Sarathi (1951, Gita for young minds)
- Shakespeare O Anyanya Anubad (2003, Macbeth, Hamlet and Othello in full and Anthony and Cleopatra in part, Rime of the Ancient Mariner)
