= Birnagar railway station =

Railway station in West Bengal, India

Birnagar
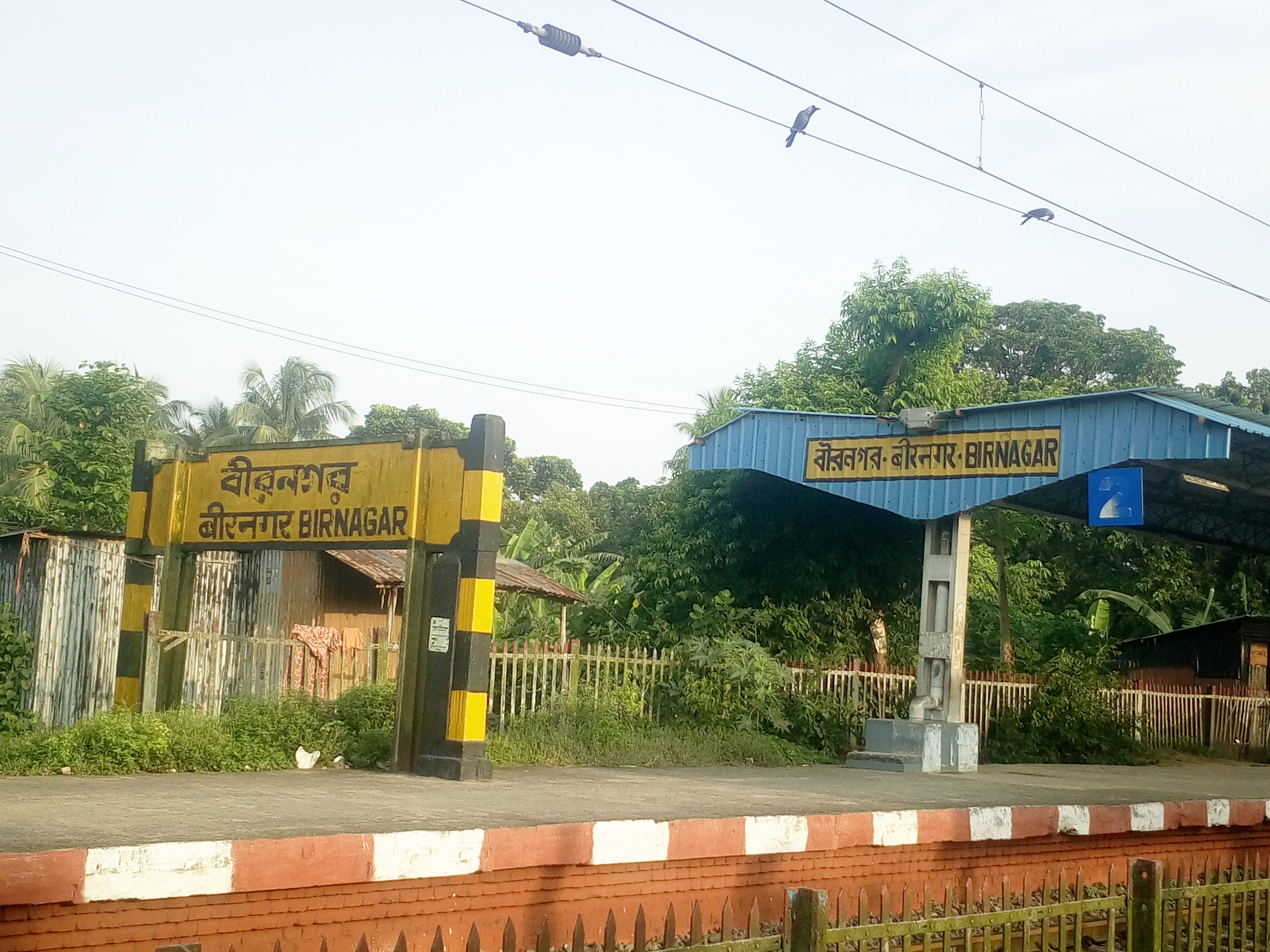

General information
- Location: Birnagar, Nadia, West Bengal; India
- Coordinates: 23°14′10″N 88°33′07″E
- System: Kolkata Suburban Railway station
- Owner: Indian Railways
- Operator: Eastern Railway
- Line: Ranaghat–Krishnanagar line of Kolkata Suburban Railway
- Platforms: 2 Side platform
- Tracks: 2

Construction
- Structure type: At grade
- Parking: Not available
- Cycle facilities: Not available
- Accessible: Not available

Other information
- Status: Functional
- Station code: BIJ
- Zone(s): Eastern Railway
- Division(s): Sealdah

History
- Opened: 1905; 121 years ago
- Electrified: 1965; 61 years ago

Services
Preceding station	Kolkata Suburban Railway	Following station
Kalinarayanpur Junction towards Sealdah	Eastern Line Ranaghat–Krishnanagar line	Taherpur towards Krishnanagar City Junction
Route map
Location
- Location within West Bengal Location within India

Birnagar railway station is part of the Kolkata Suburban Railway system and operated by Eastern Railway. It is located at Birnagar on the Ranaghat–Krishnanagar line in Nadia district in the Indian state of West Bengal.

== See also ==
- North 24 Parganas district
- Indian Railways
- Sealdah
- Sealdah–Hasnabad–Bangaon–Ranaghat line
- Lalgola and Gede branch lines
- Bangaon Junction
- Lalgola
- Transport in West Bengal
- List of railway stations in India
