= Taherpur railway station =

Railway station in West Bengal, India

Taherpur
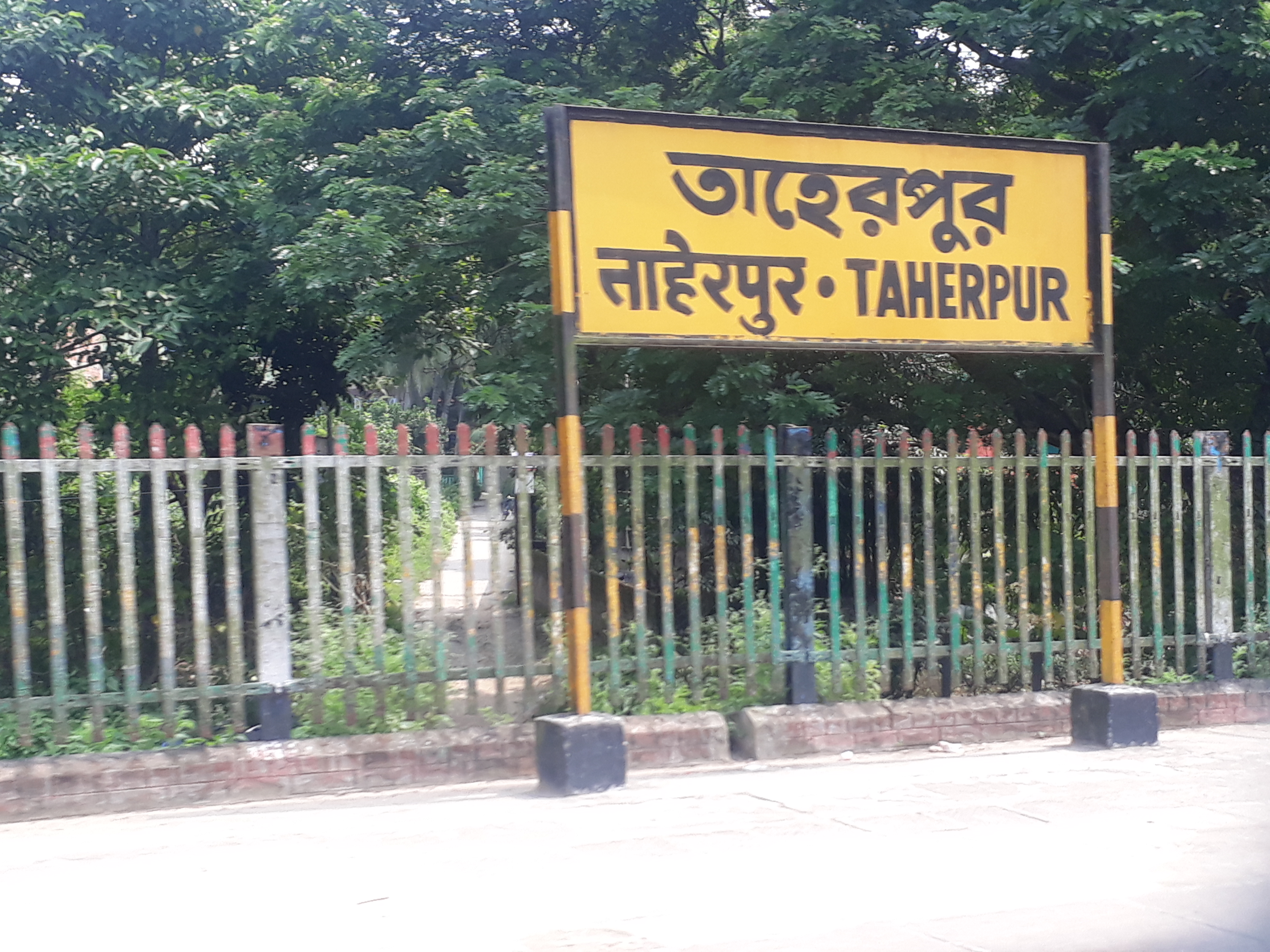
- Taherpur railway station platform

General information
- Location: Taherpur, Nadia, West Bengal; India
- Coordinates: 23.260115°N 88.543597°E
- System: Kolkata Suburban Railway station
- Owner: Indian Railways
- Operator: Eastern Railway
- Line: Ranaghat–Krishnanagar line of Kolkata Suburban Railway
- Platforms: 2
- Tracks: 2

Construction
- Structure type: At grade
- Parking: Not available
- Cycle facilities: Not available
- Accessible: Not available

Other information
- Status: Functional
- Station code: THP
- Zone(s): Eastern Railway
- Division(s): Sealdah

History
- Opened: 1905
- Electrified: 1965

Services
Preceding station	Kolkata Suburban Railway	Following station
Birnagar towards Sealdah	Eastern Line Ranaghat–Krishnanagar line	Badkulla towards Krishnanagar City Junction
Route map
Location
- Location within West Bengal Location within India

Taherpur railway station is part of the Kolkata Suburban Railway system and operated by Eastern Railway. It is located on the Ranaghat–Krishnanagar line in Nadia in the Indian state of West Bengal.

== See also ==
- North 24 Parganas district
- Indian Railways
- Sealdah
- Sealdah–Hasnabad–Bangaon–Ranaghat line
- Lalgola and Gede branch lines
- Bangaon Junction
- Lalgola
- Transport in West Bengal
- List of railway stations in India
