= Krittibas Ojha =

15th century Bengali poet

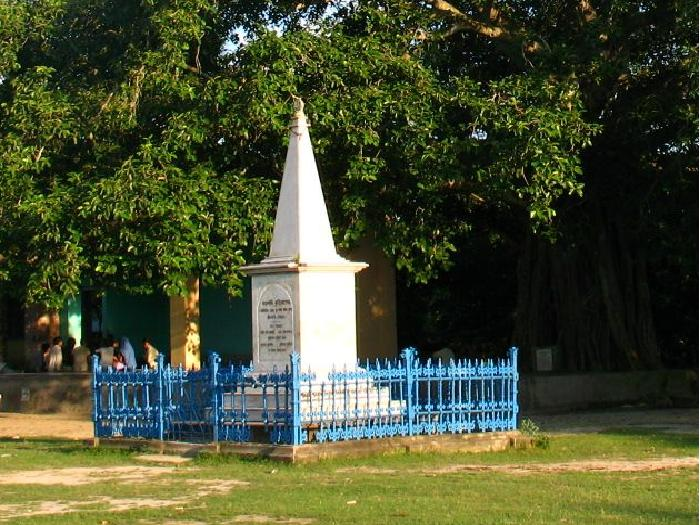
Krittibas Memorial at Phulia, Nadia.

Krittibas Ojha (Bengali pronunciation: [kɾit̪ːibaʃ od͡ʒʰa]; c. 1381 – c. 1461) was a medieval Bengali poet. His major contribution to Bengali literature and culture was Hindu epic Rāmāyaṇa in Bengali. His work, the Śrīrām Pā̃cālī, is popularly known as the Krittivasi Ramayan. His work, edited by Jaygopal Tarkalankar, was published by the Serampore Mission Press.

== Life ==
Krittibas Ojha was born in a Bengali Kulin Brahmin family at Phulia village of modern-day Nadia district in the Indian state of Paschimbanga (West Bengal). He was the eldest among his father Banamali Ojha's six sons and one daughter.

The word "Krittibas" is an epithet of the Hindu god Shiva. It is said that when Krittibas was born, his grandfather Murari Ojha was preparing for a pilgrimage to Chandaneswar in Odisha; hence, the child was named after Shiva, the presiding deity of the nearest Odishan pilgrimage site to Bengal. At the age of 11, Krittibas was sent to Nabadwip (in other opinion, to Barendra in North Bengal) for higher studies. After finishing studies he was traditionally honoured by the King of Gauda himself by the offerings of a garland, some sandal water and a silk scarf. Upon returning to his home at Phulia, he translated the Valmiki Ramayana epic & The original Mahabharata epic into Bengali (Sadhu Bhasha or Sanskritised Bengali). Kritibas Ojha himself later transcipted the Sadhu Bhasha or Sanskritised Bengali version of Valmiki Ramayana epic in Chalit Bhasha or Simple Bengali version. Later on in the 1930s Kazi Nazrul Islam transcipted Sadhu bhasha or Sanskritised Bengali version of Mahabharata epic in Chalit bhasha or Simple Bengali version.

The identity of the 'King of Gaur', who is described by Krittibas to be on good terms with the Hindu population, is hotly debated. Some argue that it refers to Raja Ganesha, historian R. C. Majumdar argues in favour of the Bengali sultan Ruknuddin Barbak Shah.
