= Krittivasi Ramayan =

15th century rendition of Ramayana

- Author: Krittibas Ojha
- Original title: কৃত্তিবাসী রামায়ণ
- Language: Bengali
- Genre: Mythology, Religious
- Publisher: Various
- Publication date: 15th century
- Publication place: Bengal, India

Kṛttivāsī Rāmāyaṇ (Note: Bengali: কৃত্তিবাসী রামায়ণ, romanized: Kr̥ttibasī Ramaẏôṇô, IPA: [ˈkrittibaʃi ˈramajɔn].) also called Śrīrām Pãcālī, (Note: Bengali: শ্রীরাম পাঁচালী, romanized: Śrīramô Pā̃calī, IPA: [ˈʃriram ˈpãtʃali].) composed by the fourteenth-century Bengali poet Krittibas Ojha, from whom it takes its name, is a rendition of the Rāmāyaṇa into Bengali. Written in the traditional Rāmāyaṇa Pā̃cālī form of Middle Bengali literature, the Kṛttivāsī Rāmāyaṇ is not just a rewording of the original Indian epic, but also a vivid reflection of the society and culture of Bengal across the period of its circulation, from the Middle Ages into the modern period. It was characterised by Dinesh Chandra Sen in 1911 as 'by far the most popular book in Bengal' and 'the Bible of the people of the Gangetic Valley'.

== Manuscripts and origins ==
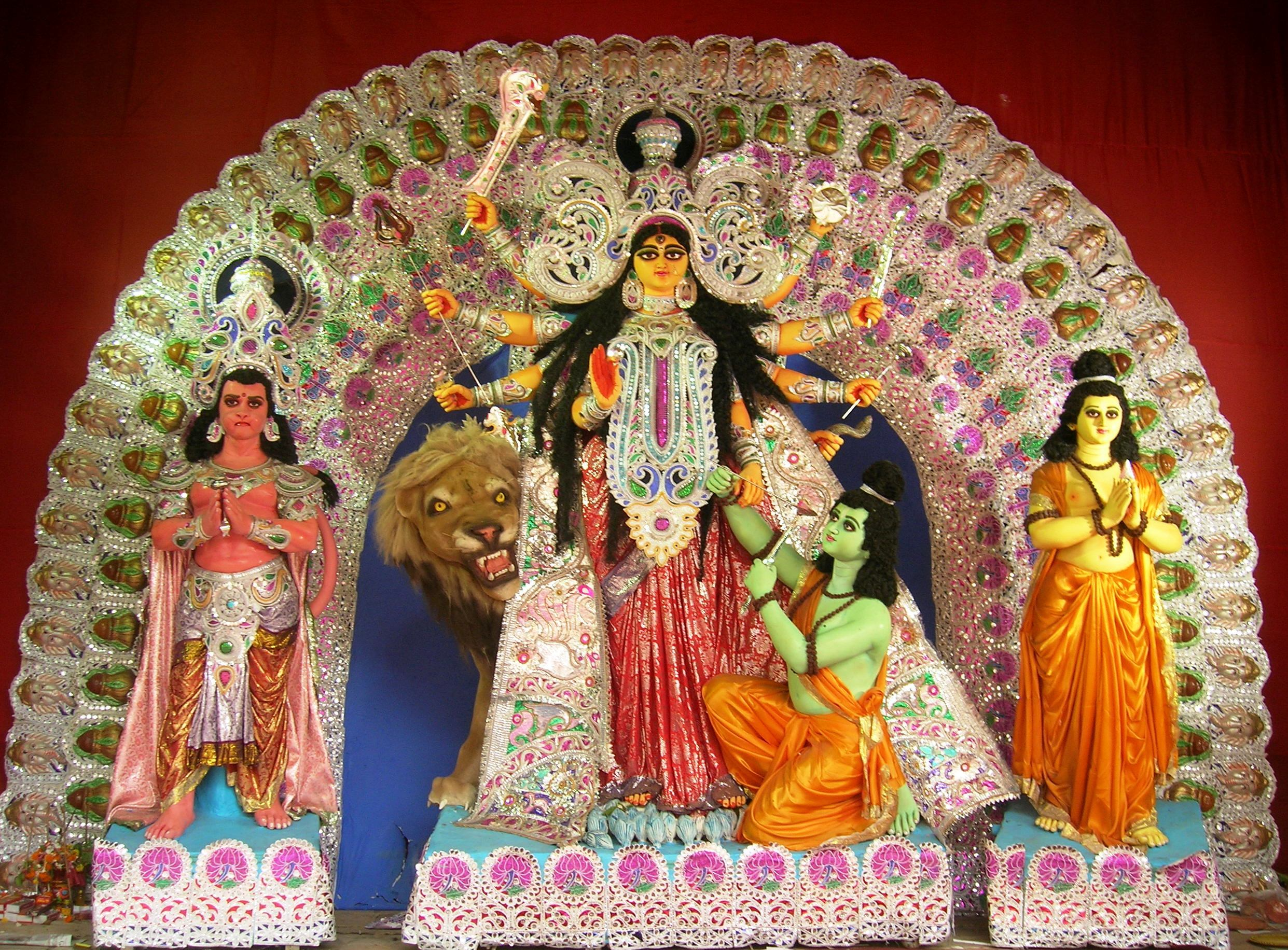
Rama worshipping Durga, as part of the Durga Puja setup.

The Krittivas Ramayan appears to be a translation into Bengali from one or another recension of the Sanskrit text known as Valmiki's Ramayana. If the popular association of the Krittivas Ramayan with Krittibas Ojha and the available biographical information about him is correct, the Krittibas Ramayan was composed in the fifteenth century CE. But it is far from clear how similar any version of the text known today is to what this figure might have composed in the fifteenth century; the text underwent various changes at the hands of various puthi scribes, who tended to add more material to the text, and nineteenth-century pandits were also influential in determining the content of the printed editions that predominate today. Over 1500 manuscripts of the poem are extant, but most date to the last quarter of the eighteenth century or later, and they are enormously varied (with some variations reflecting regional transmission within Bengal); even the earliest manuscript fragments are at least two centuries later than the putative author's estimated period. Some attempts have been made to produce scholarly editions, but, in the view of Philippe Benoît, 'sans résultat probant' ('without convincing results'); in these circumstances, he concludes 'il est impossible de se faire une idée du texte original de Krittibâs' ('it is impossible to formulate an impression of the original text of Krittibas').

Extant manuscripts are presently stored in West Bengal universities such as the University of Calcutta, Visva-Bharati University, Rabindra Bharati University, Jadavpur University, University of Burdwan, and the University of North Bengal. There are also puntis preserved in the Silchar Normal School Library, Assam; Jahangirnagar University and the University of Dhaka, Bangladesh; the British Library and the School of Oriental and African Studies in the United Kingdom; and the Bibliothèque nationale de France.

== Content ==
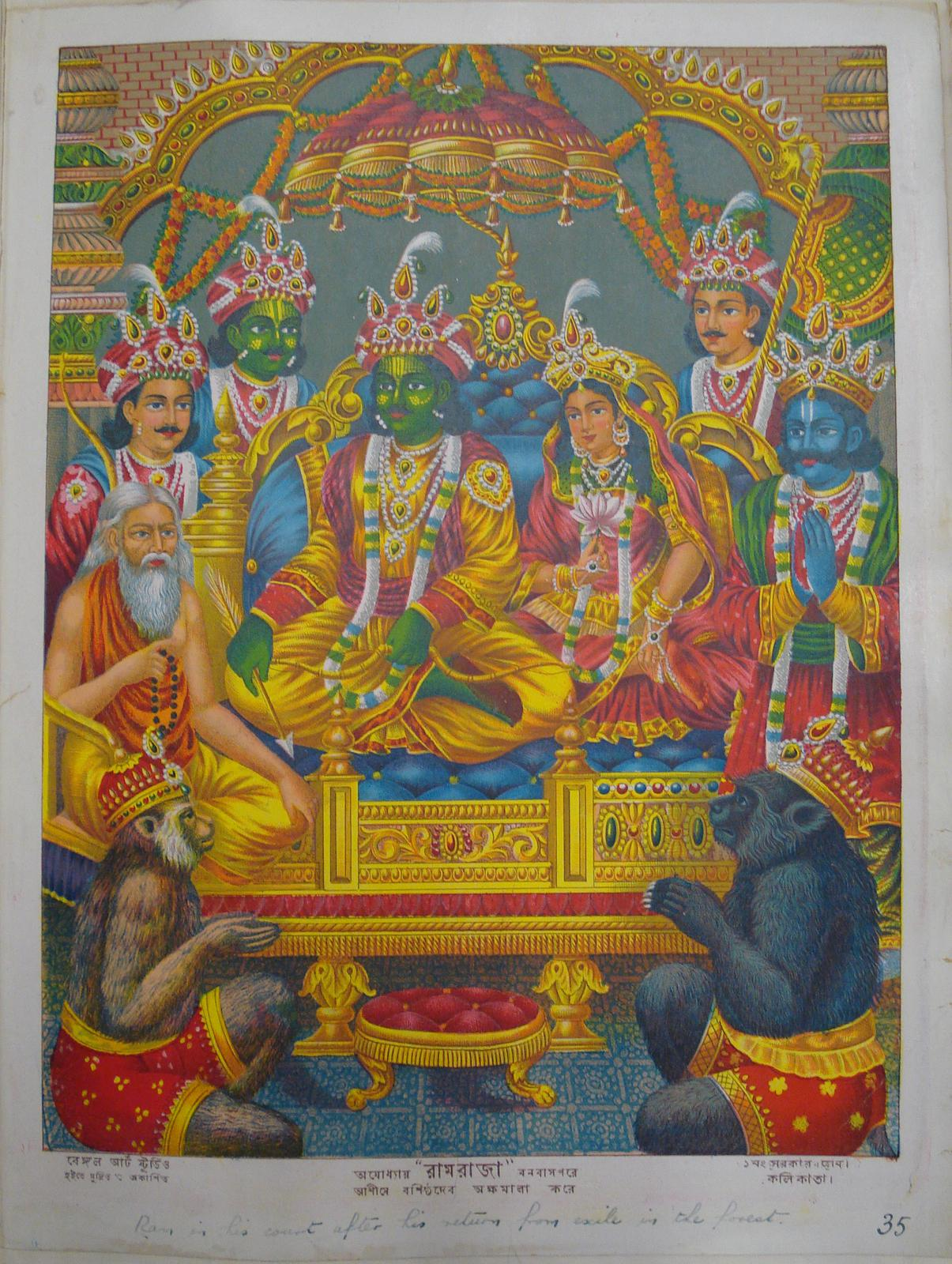
Lithograph printed in 1895 at Calcutta depicting Rama enthroned with Sita to his left, surrounded by Vasistha, Lakshmana(with bow), Bharata(green), Shatrughna(with fan) & Vibhishana(blue) while Hanuman(left) & Jambavan(right) are kneeling before him in reverence. Contrary to the popular depiction of Rama with blue skin similar to Vishnu, Krritivasa described Rama's complexion to be 'as green as fresh grass'.

Like its model, Valmiki's Ramayana, the work is divided into seven books, in this case Adikando, Ajodhyakando, Aranya Kando, Kishkindha Kando, Sundor Kando, Lankhakando, and Uttorkando. It does not greatly alter the structure or overall plot of its source, though it does make localised alterations.

However, in the assessment of Philippe Benoît,

It is especially through a vigorous reorientation of style of the narrative that Krittibâs distinguishes himself from the Valmikian model. Very elaborate in the details and descriptions, his narrative is animated by much faster and breath taking rhythm, by a systematic familiarization to the detriment of hieratic epic, all elements which transform the solemn Sanskrit epic into a narrative that is sung, lively and familiar. The changes of values and motivations that it shows are in particular harmony with the Valmikian narration and its themes. By over-dramatizing a lot, sometimes simplifying, by using a composite language, sometimes literary, sometimes popular, looking to satisfy the expectations of the public, to instruct through a relaxed and often amusing tone, Krittibâs has achieved an equilibrium: while avoiding vulgarity, he entertains and instructs, moves and amuses, in a manner that is accessible to the average Bengali. His Ramayana is not the sum total of strictly Brahminical culture, written for a literate public; it is no doubt still a medium of Brahminical culture, but Brahminism devoid of its solemnity, meant to inform with affability the perception of this culture by a public of simple people.

=== Sample ===
Ruth Vanita has called attention to the account in multiple versions of Krittivasi Ramayan of the birth of Bhagiratha to two women (widows of King Dilīpa, who dies before he can himself beget the heir which has been divinely ordained to his line): a rare ancient portrayal of human lesbian reproduction. Notwithstanding the extensive variation in the different manuscripts and printed editions of the text, this representation of Bhagiratha's birth seems to be present in most of the Krittivasi Ramayan textual tradition. The story appears in the Adi Kanda, the first section of the poem, which recounts the ancestry of Rāmā:

Dilipa ruled like Indra, the king of the gods, but was sad as he did not have a son. Leaving behind his two wives in the city of Ayodhya, Dilipa went in search of the Ganga. He performed a severe penance for countless years, living on water and fasting, but he neither found the Ganga nor became free of his sorrow. King Dilipa died and went to Brahma's world. On his death the city of Ayodhya was kingless. In heaven, Brahma and Indra were worried: "We have heard that Vishnu will be born in the family of the sun. How will this be possible if the line comes to an end?"

All the gods consulted together and decided to send the three-eyed god, Shiva, to Ayodhya. Riding his bull, Shiva went to Dilipa's two queens and said to them: "By my blessings, one of you will have a son." Hearing Shiva's words, the two women said: "We are widows, how can we have a child?" Shankara replied: "You two have intercourse with one another. By my blessings one of you will have a lovely child." Having bestowed this boon, the god who destroys the three worlds went his way.

The two wives of Dilipa took a bath. They lived together in extreme love. After some days, one of them menstruated. Both of them knew one another's intentions and enjoyed love play, and one of them conceived.

Ten months passed, it was time for the birth. The child emerged as a lump of flesh. Both of them cried with the son in their lap: "Why did the three-eyed one bless us with such a son? He has no bones, he is a lump of flesh, he cannot move about. Seeing him, the whole world will laugh at us." Weeping, they put him in a basket and went to the bank of the river Sarayu to throw him into the water.

The sage Vashistha saw them and understood everything through his powers of meditation. He said: "Leave the child on the road. Someone will have compassion on him, seeing him helpless."

The two of them left their son on the road and went home. Just then the sage Ashtavakra came along for his bath. Bent at eight places, the sage walked with great difficulty. Seeing the child from a distance, Ashtavakra thought: "If you are mimicking me in order to make fun of me, may your body be destroyed by my curse. If, however, your body is naturally as it appears, may you, by my blessing, become like Madanmohan, the god of erotic love."

Ashtavakra was as powerful as Vishnu, so neither his curses nor his blessings failed to bear fruit. He was a sage endowed with great and miraculous powers. The prince stood up. Through his powers of meditation, the sage came to know that this son of Dilipa was an auspicious one, a great man.

The sage called the two queens, who took their son and returned home, delighted. The sage came too and performed all the sacred rituals. Because he was born of two vulvas (bhagas) he was named Bhagiratha. The great poet Krittivasa is a recognized scholar. In this Adi Kanda he sings of the birth of Bhagiratha.

== Influence ==
The Krittivasi Ramayan is thought to have been the single most popular single book in the whole of pre-modern Bengal, and remains in widespread circulation in the twenty-first century. The eighteenth-century Bengali raja Krishnachandra Roy attempted to ban people from reading it in an attempt to promote the Sanskritisation of Bengali religion. The epic of Krittivas has had a profound impact on the literature of Bengal and the North India, Bihar, Jharkhand And Odisha regions. Tulsidas—the sixteenth-century Awadhi Ramayana also called Ramcharitmanas deeply inspired from Krittivasi Ramayan . The story of Rama as depicted by Krittivas Ojha inspired many later-day poets, including Michael Madhusudan Dutt and Rabindranath Tagore.

The text is noted for its exploration of the concept of Bhakti, which would later contribute to the emergence of Vaishnavism in Gangetic Bengal and the surrounding regions.

== Editions and translations ==
The editio princeps of the poem is Valmiki, [The Ramayana in Bengali], trans. by Krttibas, 5 vols (Serampore: Printed at the Mission Press, 1803). The version of the epic generally in circulation today was revised by Jaygopal Tarkalankar and was published in 1834. Later in the twentieth century, various editions were published based on the Jaygopal Tarkalankar version.

- Chandrodaya Vidyavinod Bhattacharyya (ed.), Sachitra Krittivasi Saptakanda Ramayana (Calcutta: Manoranjan Bandopadhyaya at Hitavadi Pustakalaya, 1914). A passage is translated by Kumkum Roy, 'Krittivasa Ramayana: The Birth of Bhagiratha (Bengali)', in Same-Sex Love in India: Readings from Literature and History, ed. by Ruth Vanita and Saleem Kidwai (New York: St. Martin’s, 2000) [repr. New Delhi: Macmillan, 2002], pp. 100-2; doi:10.1007/978-1-349-62183-5_12.
- Dinesh Chandra Sen, The Bengali Ramayanas (Kolkata: University of Calcutta, 1920), pp. 171-83 (translates excerpts).
- Krittibasi Ramayan. Sachitra-Samagra-Saptakando-Jiban Sambalita (Calcutta: Basumati Sahitya Mandir, 1926).
- Nalinikanta Bhattasali (ed.), Ramayana-Adikanda (Dacca: P.C. Lahiri, Secretary, Oriental Texts Publication Committee, University of Dacca, 1936), the first of seven parts of a version of the Krittivasi Ramayan that differs from the most widely read version, based on a unique manuscript. A passage is translated by Anannya Dasgupta in Ruth Vanita, Love's Rite: Same-Sex Marriage in India and the West (New York: Palgrave Macmillan, 2005), pp. 147-49 and in Ruth Vanita, 'Born of Two Vaginas: Love and Reproduction between Co-Wives in Some Medieval Indian Texts', GLQ: A Journal of Lesbian and Gay Studies, 11 (2005), 547–77 (pp. 553-55), doi:10.1215/10642684-11-4-547.
- Shudha Mazumdar (trans.), Ramayana, foreword by Dr. S. Radhakrishnan (New Delhi: Orient Longman, 1958 [repr. 1974]), a 'loose translation'.
- Benimadhab Sil (ed.), Sacitra Krittibasi saptakanda Ramayana (Calcutta: Akshaya Library, 1361 [Bengali Calendar]/1954). Illustrated Bengali version of Krittivasi Ramayan.
- Nandkumar Avasthi (ed. and trans.), Krittivasa Ramayana (Lucknow: Bhuvan Vani, 1966), with Hindi translation.
- Bhattacharya, Asutosh (ed.), Krittibasi Ramayana (Calcutta: Akhil Bharat Janashiksha Prachar Samiti, 1970) (Bengali-language edition).
- Rāmāyana of Krittibās (Calcutta: Akshay Library, 1987).
- Krittivasa Ojha, 'Ramayana', trans. by Ujjwal Majumdar, in Medieval Indian Literature: Surveys and Selections. Volume 1, ed. by K. Ayyappa Paniker (New Delhi: Sahitya Akademi, 1997), pp. 720–27 ISBN 8126003650 (translates seven short passages).
