= Santipur College =

- Type: Undergraduate college Public college
- Established: 1948; 78 years ago
- Affiliations: University of Kalyani
- Principal: Dr. Chandrima Bhattacharya
- Location: N.S Road, Santipur, West Bengal, 741404, India; 23.2533227°N 88.4350199°E
- Campus: Urban
- Website: Santipur College
- Location in West Bengal Santipur College (India)

Santipur College, established in 1948, is a college in Santipur, in Nadia district, West Bengal, India. It offers undergraduate courses in arts and sciences. It is affiliated to the University of Kalyani.

== History ==
This college was established on 22 July 1948 by local educationists of Santipur and under the guidance of the then Member of Parliament, Lok Sabha Pandit Laxmi Kanta Maitra. Santipur college started its functioning at the Kharjala Garden House of Mr. Atal Bihari Maitra and was initially affiliated to University of Calcutta. The journey that commenced in a two storied building initially with 48 students only. In the session 2014 - 2015 the college had 15 departments and catered to the needs of 4690 students. The college is now affiliated to University of Kalyani.

== Departments ==
=== Science ===
- Chemistry
- Physics
- Mathematics
- Botany
- Zoology
- Computer Application

=== Arts and Commerce ===
- Bengali
- English
- Sanskrit
- History
- Geography
- Political Science
- Philosophy
- Economics
- Commerce

== Accreditation ==
Santipur College was awarded B+ grade by the National Assessment and Accreditation Council (NAAC). The college is recognized by the University Grants Commission (UGC).

== News ==
Demonstration of students in front of the college against the non-issuance of mark sheet by the college on 31 August 2021.

== See also ==
- List of institutions of higher education in West Bengal
- Education in India
- Education in West Bengal
