= Churni River =

River in West Bengal, India

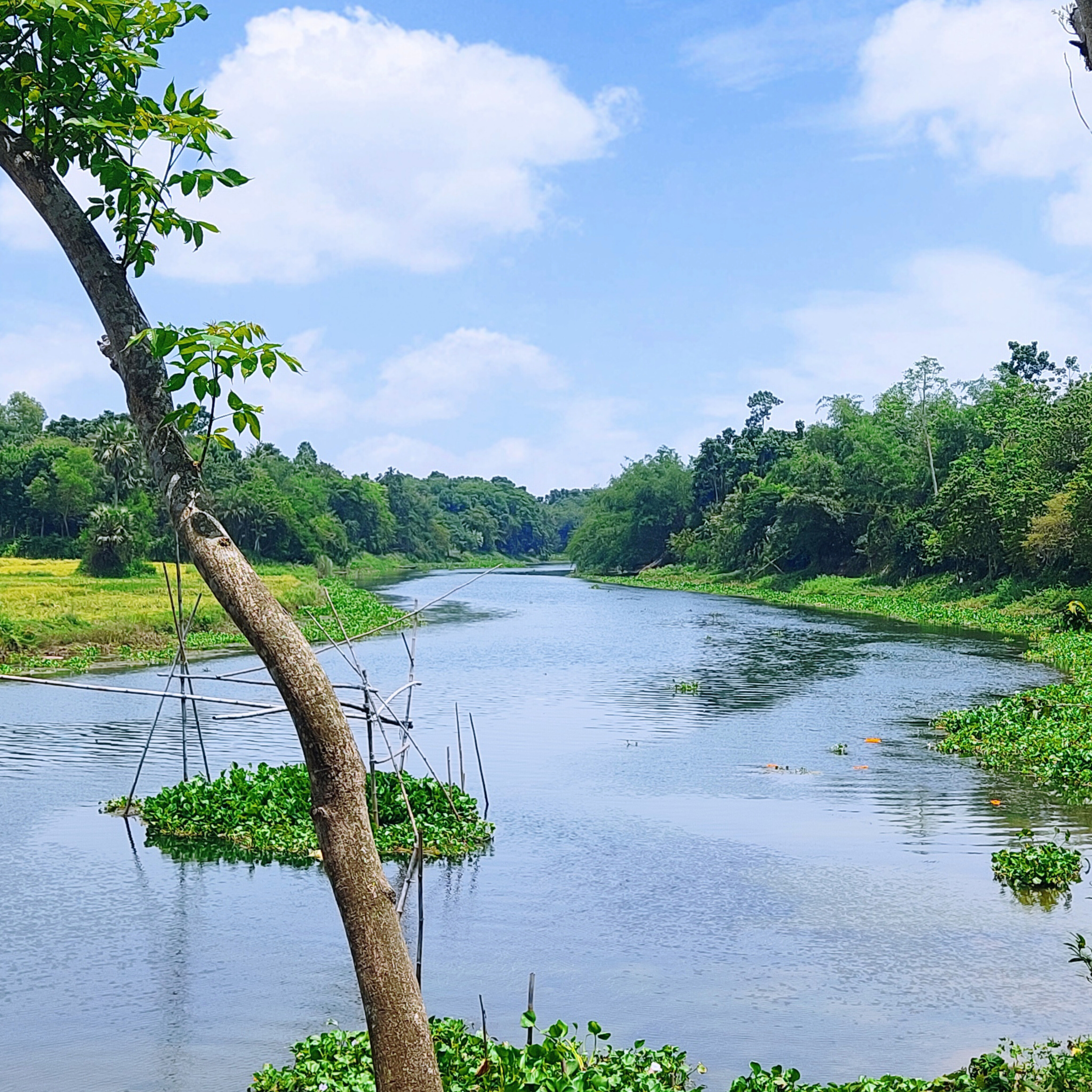
- A stretch of Churni river, Radhanagar-Kalinarayanpur
- Native name: চূর্ণী (Bengali)

Location
- Country: India
- State: West Bengal
- Cities: Ranaghat

Physical characteristics
- Source: Mathabhanga
  - location: Majhdia
- Mouth: Bhagirathi
  - location: Mangaldwip
- Length: 53 km (33 mi)

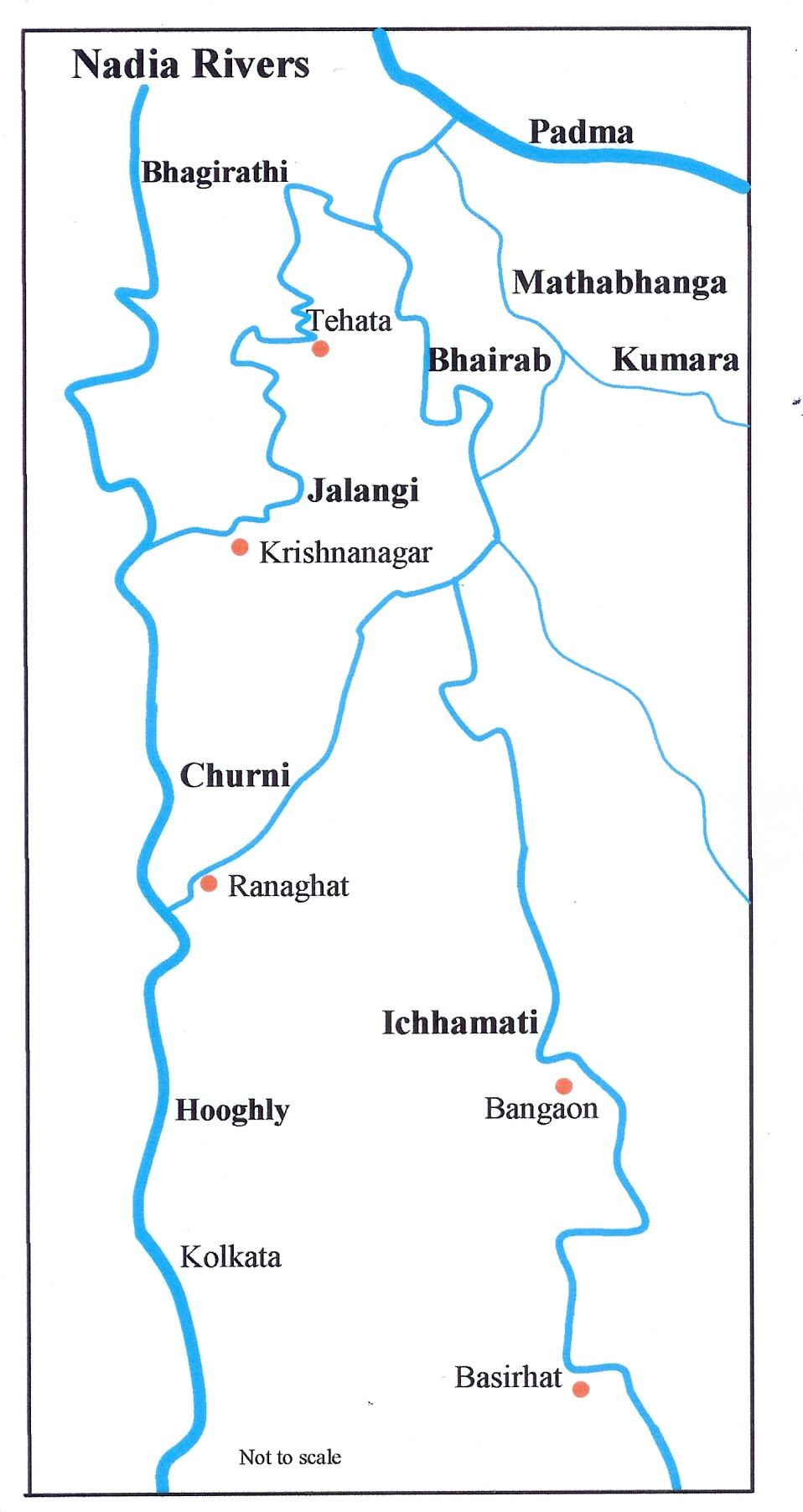

The Churni River is a distributary of the Mathabhanga River and a tributary of the Hooghly River, flowing through Nadia district in West Bengal, India. The Mathabhanga River itself is a distributary of the Padma River. The Mathabhanga-Churni is one of the three Nadia Rivers —Bhagirathi, Jalangi, and Mathabhanga. The Mathabhanga-Churni system is also an Indo-Bangladesh transboundary river.

== Course ==
Char-Mahishkunadi village is located to the east of Char-Madhugori, along the northeastern border of Karimpur-1 block. To the east of the border fence of Char-Mahishkunadi lies a narrow bypass channel of the Padma River in Bangladesh. The Mathabhanga River branches off from this bypass channel at coordinates 24° 03' 43" N and 88° 44' 21" E. However, the Mathabhanga is "beheaded" because its source from the Padma feeder channel is blocked by a large sandbar, except during the monsoon when water flows for one or two months. The Mathabhanga River runs 196.40 km from its offtake at Char-Mahishkunadi to Pabakhali near Majdia, where it splits into the Churni and Ichhamati rivers. The right-bank distributary of the Mathabhanga River is the Churni River. From Majdia, the Churni flows northwest to Shibnibas, then southeast, passing through Chandannagar, Benali, Hanskhali, Bapujinagar, Byaspur, Aranghata, Kailarayanpur, Ranaghat, and Masunda, before emptying into the Hooghly River at Shibpur. The Churni River covers a distance of approximately 53 km from its source at Pabakhali near Majdia to its confluence with the Hooghly River at Shibpurrr (23°07′58″ N, 88°30′08″ E), although other sources report it as 56 km. The sediment deposited at the confluence of the Churni and Hooghly rivers has created 'Mangaldwip' island, which now hosts an Eco-Tourism Park.

In various cultural narratives—including popular folklore, newspaper columns, local literature, and some research articles —the Churni River is consistently described as an artificially constructed canal. These accounts credit Maharaja Krishnachandra of Nadia with creating this waterway by diverting a segment of the Ichamati River's flow. The river was named 'Churni,' meaning 'female thief'. In 1742, fearing a Bargi invasion, Maharaja Krishnachandra is said to have shifted his capital from Krishnagar to Shibnibas, where he built a moat around the new capital and connected it by cutting the artificial Churni River to make the area impassable to invaders.

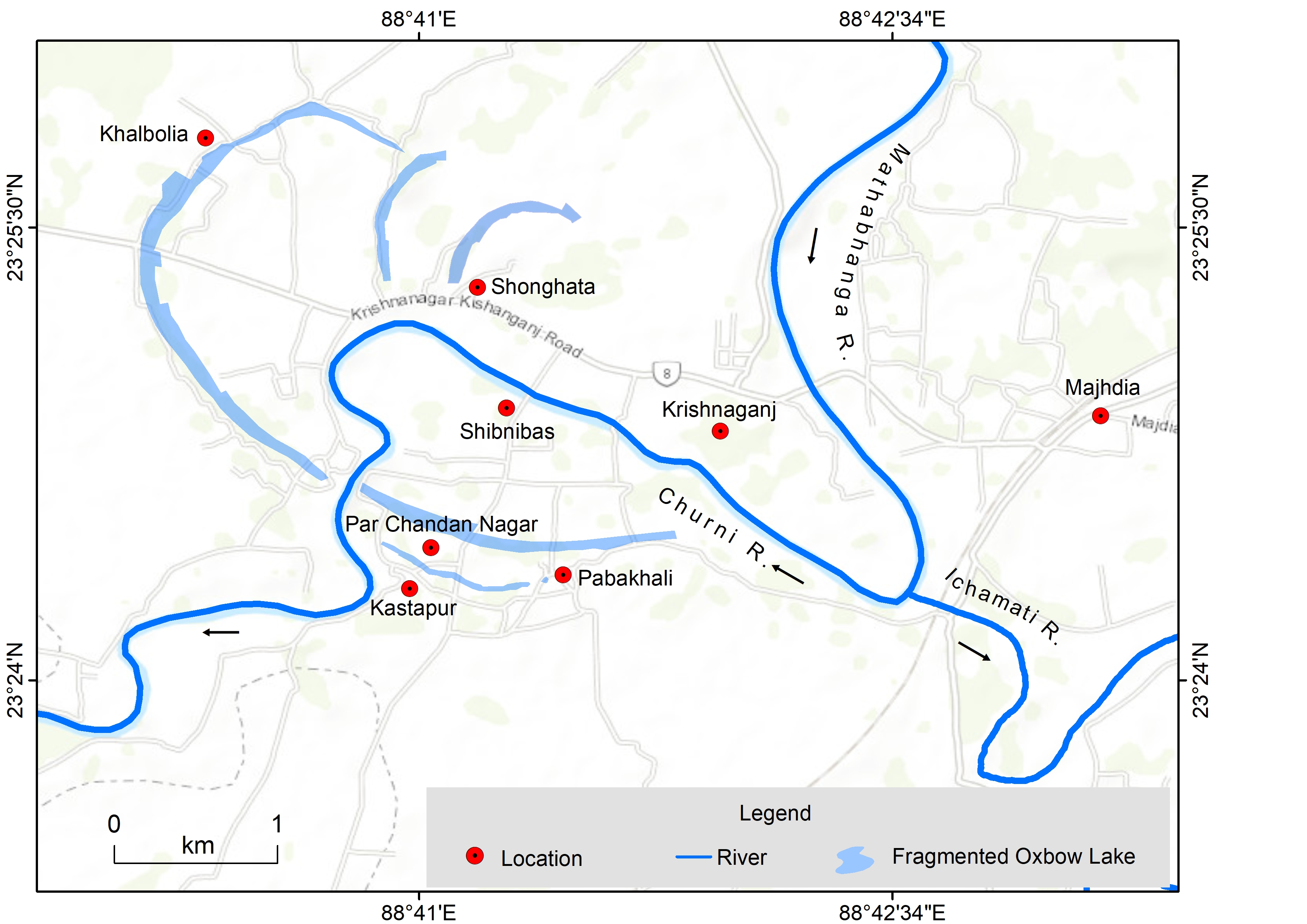
Paleo channels, meander Scars, and oxbow lakes adjacent to the present course suggest the natural origin of the R. Churni

A thorough review of existing literatures Nadia Kahini, (Mallik, Kumudnath 1919) Kshitish Vansabali Charita, (Ray, Kartikeya Chandra 1876) and Sri Maharaj Krishnachandra Rayasya Charitang (Mukhopadhyay, Rajeev Lochan 1811) and an analysis of the current channel morphology of the river reveals that the myths and rumors about its origins—claiming it was artificially constructed by Maharaja Krishnachandra—are unsupported by evidence. Instead, a more likely explanation suggests that the Maharaja's efforts were directed at restoring the silted and deteriorating course of an already existing river. Additionally, there is no evidence to support the claim that Maharaja Krishnachandra named the river 'Churni'. As recently as the 1930s, the river was an important route for water travel and trade. However, in the 21st century it has partly silted up, has many small bars, and is no longer navigable.

== Pollution and water quality ==
Industrial wastewater significantly degrades fish habitats in the Mathabhanga-Churni River, particularly impacting species near the Carew and Company sugar and chemical industry. Sites RE1 and RE2, closer to this industrial complex, experience higher pollution levels than RE3.

The primary effect of this wastewater is on the stream's oxygen levels. Decomposition of organic matter by bacteria leads to dissolved oxygen depletion (0.2 mg/L) and increased BOD (68 mg/L). Additionally, free CO_{2} levels rose from 12.8 mg/L to 31 mg/L, while primary productivity plummeted from 18.4 mg C/m^{3}/hour to zero. Consequently, industrial pollution is a major factor in habitat degradation, abnormal fish behavior, and the decline of fish species.

Urban wastewater discharge poses a significant pollution threat to the Churni River, particularly impacting fish habitats. Only the downstream part (RE3) is affected by untreated sewage from Ranaghat Municipality, which generates approximately 9,490 tons of municipal solid waste annually. The municipality's water consumption and sewage generation are estimated at 15.49 and 10.14 million liters per day (MLD), respectively, with no sewage treatment plant currently in place.

Nine major point sources of pollution exist within the municipality, with Sreenathpur (2.799 MLD) and Basko Khal (3.638 MLD) contributing significantly to sewage levels, both having a high BOD of 48 mg/L and fecal coliform counts of 900,000 MPN/100 mL and 230,000 MPN/100 mL, respectively. These outfalls greatly increase water pollution and habitat degradation.

Agricultural activities in the river basin, marked by excessive use of fertilizers and pesticides, significantly contribute to nonpoint source pollution. Unlike measurable point sources, nonpoint discharges are estimated. High concentrations of phosphate, nitrate, and ammonia are often due to agricultural runoff. This study evaluates how these practices elevate nutrient levels in the Churni River.

Phosphate: Expected phosphate levels in uncontaminated water are 0.01–0.03 mg L−1. Levels above 0.1 mg L−1 cause eutrophication. At Majhdia, phosphate peaked at 0.109 mg L−1 post-monsoon, while Ranaghat reached 0.119 mg L−1. Both locations exceed the desirable limit of 0.03 mg L−1, leading to excessive aquatic plant growth that depletes oxygen and harms aquatic life. Low dissolved oxygen levels, results in reduced fish diversity.

Nitrate: There is a direct correlation between ploughed land, nitrogen fertilizer use, and river nitrate loading. Unused nitrogen from crops enters water bodies, influenced by factors like fertilizer type and rainfall. Nitrate levels at Majhdia hit 1.21 mg L−1 post-monsoon, and Ranaghat recorded 1.14 mg L−1. All seasons exceeded the safe limit, causing respiratory issues and nerve damage in fish.

Ammonia: Ammonia concentrations have surpassed the acceptable limit of 0.1 mg L−1 in all seasons. Majhdia recorded 5.33 mg L−1 in pre-monsoon, while Ranaghat reached 0.50 mg L−1. High ammonia levels lower fish disease resistance, causing gill damage and other health issues.

== Gallery ==
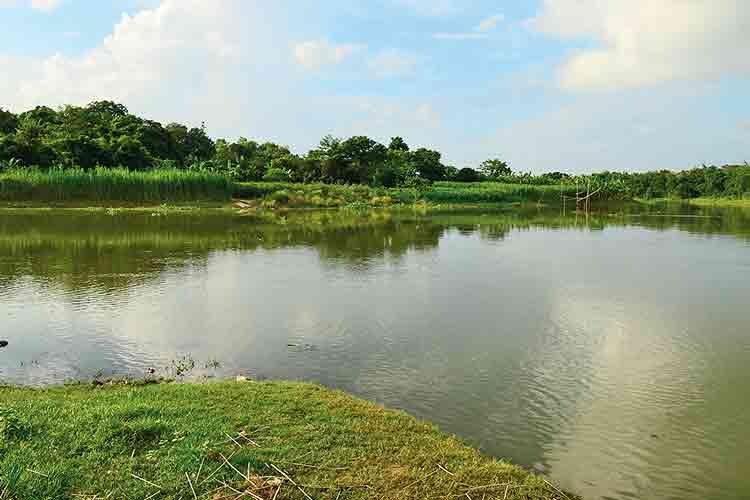
Mathabhanga divides into Churni and Ichhamati near Pabakhali, Majhdia of Nadia

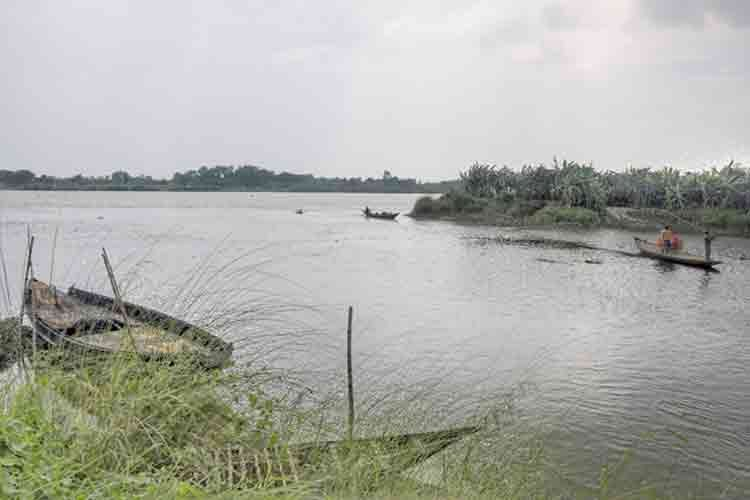
Churni meets Bhagirathi river near Shibpur, Payradanga of Nadia

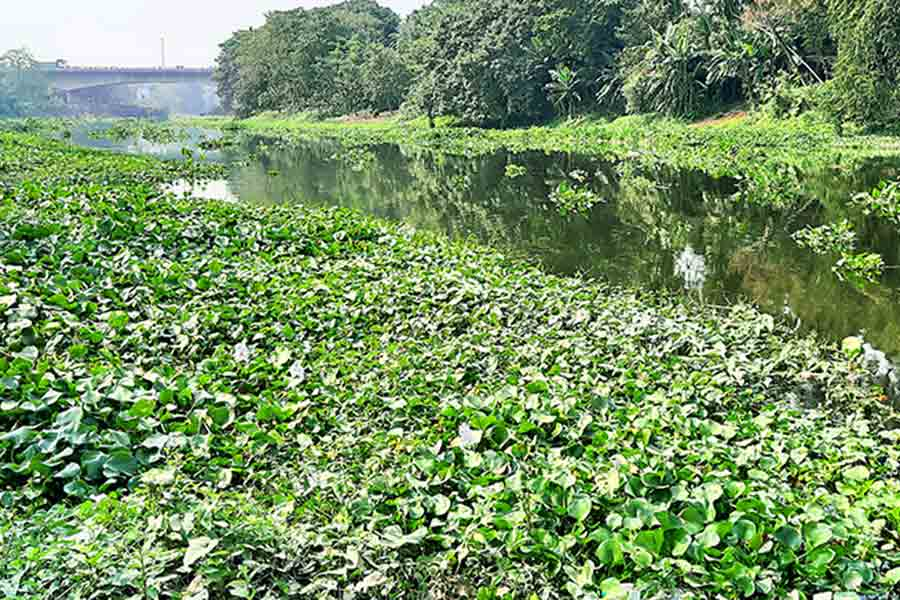
Polluted dark water filled with water hyacinth in a stretch of river near Ranaghat, Nadia
