= Duttapulia =

Town in West Bengal, India

- Village
- Location in West Bengal, India Duttapulia (India)
- Coordinates: 23°14′24″N 88°42′21″E
- Country: India
- State: West Bengal
- District: Nadia

Population (2011)
  - Total: 13,562

Languages
  - Official: Bengali, English
- Time zone: UTC+5:30 (IST)
- Telephone/STD code: 03454
- Lok Sabha constituency: Ranaghat
- Vidhan Sabha constituency: Ranaghat Uttar Purba
- Website: nadia.gov.in

Dattapulia is a village in the Ranaghat II CD block in the Ranaghat subdivision of the Nadia district, West Bengal, India.

== Geography ==
Cities and towns in Ranaghat subdivision of Nadia district
M: municipal town/ city/notified area, CT: census town, R: rural/ urban centre.
Owing to space constraints in the small map, the actual locations in a larger map may vary slightly

=== Area overview ===
Nadia district is mostly alluvial plains lying to the east of Hooghly River, locally known as Bhagirathi. The alluvial plains are cut across by such distributaries as Jalangi, Churni and Ichhamati. With these rivers getting silted up, floods are a recurring feature. The Ranaghat subdivision has the Bhagirathi on the west, with Purba Bardhaman and Hooghly districts lying across the river. Topographically, Ranaghat subdivision is spread across the Krishnanagar-Santipur Plain, which occupies the central part of the district, and the Ranaghat-Chakdaha Plain, the low-lying area found in the south-eastern part of the district. The Churni separates the two plains. A portion of the east forms the boundary with Bangladesh. The lower portion of the east is covered by a portion of the North 24 Parganas district. The subdivision has achieved reasonably high urbanisation. 41.68% of the population lives in urban areas and 58.32% lives in rural areas.

Note: The map alongside presents some of the notable locations in the subdivision. All places marked in the map are linked in the larger full screen map. All the four subdivisions are presented with maps on the same scale – the size of the maps vary as per the area of the subdivision.

=== Gram Panchayat ===
It is governed by Gram Panchayat and although considered as a rural village Dattapulia's people enjoy as many facilities as those of a town. Duttapulia GP contains 14 localities, stated below : Baranberia, Barbaria, Chandipur, Duttapulia, Habaspur, Kalinagar, Kalupur, Kanibamni, Kushoberia, Manosahati, Narayanpur, Nathkhura and Srirampur.

The whole area is ruled by Dhantala Police Station and the three nearest railway stations from here are Aranghata (10 km), Bagula (15 km) & Ranaghat (19 km).

Another important thing about Duttapulia is it is situated at one end of Nadia District as well as at the border of India-Bangladesh. The Ichamati River separates North 24 Parganas from Nadia and the national border separates Bangladesh from India. It is a most secure place in West Bengal.

== Demographics ==
According to the 2011 Census of India, Duttapulia had a total population of 13,562, of which 7,010 (52%) were males and 6,552 (48%) were females. Population in the age range 6 years was 1,212. The total number of literate persons in Duttapulia was 9,985 (80.85% of the population over 6 years).

== Education ==
Duttapulia Union Academy is a Bengali-medium boys only institution established in 1949. The school has facilities for teaching from class V to class XII. It has a library with 997 books, 10 computers and a playground.

Duttapulia Union Academy for Girls is a Bengali-medium girls only institution established in 1974. The school has facilities for teaching from class V to class XII. It has a library with 500 books, 5 computers and a playground.

Pritilata Waddedar Mahavidyalaya was established at Panikhali in 2007. It was founded as a women's college but later became co-educational. It is a government aided general degree college.

== Healthcare ==
There is a primary health centre at Duttapulia, with 10 beds.
