= Hanskhali (community development block) =

- Community development block
- Coordinates: 23.3677471°N 88.6331463°E
- Country: India
- State: West Bengal
- District: Nadia

Government
  - Type: Community development block

Area
  - Total: 246.29 km^{2} (95.09 sq mi)
- Elevation: 11 m (36 ft)

Population (2011)
  - Total: 293,040
  - Density: 1,189.8/km^{2} (3,081.6/sq mi)

Languages
  - Official: Bengali, English

Literacy (2011)
  - Total literates: 212,314 (80.11%)
- Time zone: UTC+5:30 (IST)
- PIN: 741505 (Hanskhali); 741502 (Bagula)
- Telephone/STD code: 03473
- Vehicle registration: WB-51, WB-52
- Lok Sabha constituency: Ranaghat
- Vidhan Sabha constituency: Krishnaganj, Ranaghat Uttar Purba
- Website: nadia.nic.in

Hanskhali is a community development block that forms an administrative division in Ranaghat subdivision of Nadia district in the Indian state of West Bengal.

== Geography ==
Hanskhali is located at 23°22′04″N 88°37′59″E.

Hanskhali CD Block is bounded by Krishnaganj CD Block in the north, Jibannagar Upazila in Chaudanga District and Maheshpur Upazila in Jhenaidah District in Bangladesh in the east, Ranaghat I and Ranaghat II CD Blocks in the south and Krishnanagar I and Santipur CD Blocks in the west.

Nadia district is mostly alluvial plains lying to the east of Hooghly River, locally known as Bhagirathi. The alluvial plains are cut across by such distributaries as the Jalangi, Churni and Ichhamati. With these rivers getting silted up, floods are a recurring feature.

Hanskhali CD Block has an area of 246.29 km^{2}. It has 1 panchayat samity, 13 gram panchayats, 231 gram sansads (village councils), 81 mouzas and 76 inhabited villages. Hanskhali police station serves this block. Headquarters of this CD Block is at Bagula.

It lies 13 km from Krishnanagar, the district headquarters.

Gram panchayats of Hanskhali block/ panchayat samiti are: Bagula I, Bagula II, Badkulla I, Badkulla II, Betna Gobindapur, Dakshinpara I, Dakshinpara II, Gazna, Mamjoan, Mayurhat I, Mayurhat II, Ramnagar Barachupria I and Ramnagar Barachupria II.

== Demographics ==
=== Population ===
As per the 2011 Census of India, Hanskhali CD Block had a total population of 293,040, of which 245,899 were rural and 11,252 were urban. There were 151,645 (52%) males and 141,395 (48%) females. The population below 6 years was 27,997. Scheduled Castes numbered 144,090 (49.17%) and Scheduled Tribes numbered 8,373 (2.86%).

As per the 2001 census, Hanskhali block had a total population of 260,916, out of which 133,867 were males and 127,049 were females. Hanskhali block registered a population growth of 20.63 per cent during the 1991-2001 decade. Decadal growth for the district was 19.51 per cent. Decadal growth in West Bengal was 17.84 per cent.

There are three census towns in Hanskhali CD Block (2011 census figures in brackets): Bagula (22,649), Badkulla (18,051) and Patuli (6,441).

Large villages (with 4,000+ population) in Hanskhali CD Block were (2011 census figures in brackets): Itabaria (5,952), Betna (5,633), Benali (4,363), Gazna (5,643), Payradanda (9,710), Ber Gram (4,073), Gobindapur (12,300), Dakshinpara (8,336), Jaypur (13,437), Purba Khamar Simulia (5,534), Hanshkhali (5,066), Muragachha (12,336), Mamjoani (5,541), Bhayna (7,344), Paschim Harindanga (6,042), Garpota (8,068), Kaikhali (4,333), Bayardengi (4,680), Ulasi (4,866), Chupria (8021), Umarpur (4,872) and Ramnagar (5,235).,

Other villages in Hanskhali CD Block include (2011 census figures in brackets): Mayurhat (3,081).

=== Literacy ===
As per the 2011 census, the total number of literates in Hanskhali CD Block was 212,314 (80.11% of the population over 6 years) out of which males numbered 116,570 (84.92% of the male population over 6 years) and females numbered 95,744 (74.94% of the female population over 6 years). The gender disparity (the difference between female and male literacy rates) was 9.98%.

See also – List of West Bengal districts ranked by literacy rate

Literacy in CD blocks of
Nadia district
Tehatta subdivision
Karimpur I – 67.70%
Karimpur II – 62.04%
Tehatta I – 70.72%
Tehatta II – 68.52%
Krishnanagar Sadar subdivision
Kaliganj – 65.89%
Nakashipara – 64.86%
Chapra – 68.25%
Krishnanagar I – 71.45%
Krishnanagar II – 68.52%
Nabadwip – 67.72%
Krishnaganj – 72.86%
Ranaghat subdivision
Hanskhali – 80.11%
Santipur – 73.10%
Ranaghat I – 77.61%
Ranaghat II – 79.38%
Kalyani subdivision
Chakdaha – 64.17%
Haringhata – 82.15%
Source: 2011 Census: CD Block Wise
Primary Census Abstract Data

=== Language and religion ===
Religion in Hanskhali CD block (2011)
Hinduism	87.98%
Islam	11.39%
Other or not stated	0.63%

In the 2011 census, Hindus numbered 257,804 and formed 87.98% of the population in Hanskhali CD Block. Muslims numbered 33,369 and formed 11.39% of the population. Christians numbered 215 and formed 0.07% of the population. Others numbered 1,652 and formed 0.56% of the population.

In the 2001 census, Hindus numbered 231,466 and formed 88.70% of the population of Hanskhali CD Block. Muslims numbered 29,336 and formed 11.42% of the population. In the 1991 census, Hindus numbered 191,526 and formed 88.55% of the population of Hanskhali CD Block. Muslims numbered 24,705 and formed 11.24% of the population.

Bengali is the predominant language, spoken by 99.10% of the population.

== Rural poverty ==
The District Human Development Report for Nadia has provided a CD Block-wise data table for Modified Human Vulnerability Index of the district. Hanskhali CD Block registered 31.65 on the MHPI scale. The CD Block-wise mean MHVI was estimated at 33.92. A total of 8 out of the 17 CD Blocks in Nadia district were found to be severely deprived when measured against the CD Block mean MHVI - Karimpur I and Karimpur II (under Tehatta subdivision), Kaliganj, Nakashipara, Chapra, Krishnanagar I and Nabadwip (under Krishnanagar Sadar subdivision) and Santipur (under Ranaghat subdivision) appear to be backward.

As per the Human Development Report 2004 for West Bengal, the rural poverty ratio in Nadia district was 28.35%. The estimate was based on Central Sample data of NSS 55th round 1999–2000.

== Economy ==
=== Livelihood ===
In Hanskhali CD Block in 2011, amongst the class of total workers, cultivators formed 25.71%, agricultural labourers 28.90, household industry workers 6.74% and other workers 38.65%.

The southern part of Nadia district starting from Krishnanagar I down to Chakdaha and Haringhata has some urban pockets specialising in either manufacturing or service related economic activity and has reflected a comparatively higher concentration of population but the urban population has generally stagnated. Nadia district still has a large chunk of people living in the rural areas.

=== Infrastructure ===
There are 76 inhabited villages in Hanskhali CD Block. 100% villages have power supply and 74 villages (94.37%) have drinking water supply. 24 Villages (31.58%) have post offices. 74 villages (97.37%) have telephones (including landlines, public call offices and mobile phones). 49 villages (64.47%) have a pucca approach road and 36 villages (47.37%) have transport communication (includes bus service, rail facility and navigable waterways). 16 villages (21.05%) have agricultural credit societies and 10 villages (13.16%) have banks. It should, however, be noted that although 100% villages in Nadia district had power supply in 2011, a survey in 2007-08 revealed that less than 50% of households had electricity connection. In rural areas of the country, the tube well was for many years considered to be the provider of safe drinking water, but with arsenic contamination of ground water claiming public attention it is no longer so. Piped water supply is still a distant dream. In 2007–08, the availability of piped drinking water in Nadia district was as low as 8.6%, well below the state average of around 20%.

=== Agriculture ===
Persons engaged in agriculture
in Hanskhali CD Block
1. Bargadars (7.49%)
2. Patta holders (10.0%)
3. Small farmers (5.89%)
4. Marginal farmers (31.1%)
5. Agricultural labourers (45.5%)

Although the Bargadari Act of 1950 recognised the rights of bargadars to a higher share of crops from the land that they tilled, it was not implemented fully. Large tracts, beyond the prescribed limit of land ceiling, remained with the rich landlords. From 1977 onwards major land reforms took place in West Bengal. Land in excess of land ceiling was acquired and distributed amongst the peasants. Following land reforms land ownership pattern has undergone transformation. In 2013–14, persons engaged in agriculture in Hanskhali CD Block could be classified as follows: bargadars 7.49%, patta (document) holders 10.02%, small farmers (possessing land between 1 and 2 hectares) 5.89%, marginal farmers (possessing land up to 1 hectare) 31.08% and agricultural labourers 45.52%. As the proportion of agricultural labourers is very high, the real wage in the agricultural sector has been a matter of concern.

Hanskhali CD Block had 176 fertiliser depots, 12 seed stores and 61 fair price shops in 2013–14.

In 2013–14, Hanskhali CD Block produced 1,680 tonnes of Aman paddy, the main winter crop from 690 hectares, 23,179 tonnes of Boro paddy (spring crop) from 6,667 hectares, 7,221 tonnes of Aus paddy (summer crop) from 3,140 hectares, 4,168 tonnes of wheat from 1,464 hectares, 80,857 tonnes of jute from 5,423 hectares and 4,762 tonnes of potatoes from 176 hectares. It also produced pulses and oilseeds.

In 2013–14, the total area irrigated in Hanskhali CD Block was 2,995 hectares, out of which 1,375 hectares were irrigated by river lift irrigation, 1,500 hectares by deep tube wells and 120 hectares by shallow tube wells.

=== Banking ===
In 2013–14, Hanskhali CD Block had offices of 11 commercial banks and 5 gramin banks.

== Transport ==
Hanskhali CD Block has 1 ferry service and 3 originating/ terminating bus services. The nearest railway station of Hanskhali is Bagula railway station situated on Sealdah—Gede Main line.

NH 12 (old number NH 34) passes through this block.

SH 3, running from Krishnanagar (in Nadia district) to Gosaba (in South 24 Parganas district) passes through this CD Block.

== Education ==
In 2013–14, Hanskhali CD Block had 166 primary schools with 12,710 students, 13 middle schools with 1,711 students, 9 high schools with 4,799 students and 25 higher secondary schools with 31,798 students. Hanskhali CD Block had 1 general college with 7,964 students and 472 institutions for special and non-formal education with 12,718 students

In Hanskhali CD Block, amongst the 76 inhabited villages, 2 villages did not have any school, 37 had more than 1 primary school and 35 had at least 1 primary and 21 had 1 middle school and 1 secondary school.

Srikrishna College was established at Bagula in 1952. Affiliated to the University of Kalyani, it offers honours courses in Bengali, English, Sanskrit, history, geography, political science, philosophy, economics, education, physics, chemistry, mathematics and accountancy.

== Healthcare ==
In 2014, Hanskhali CD Block had 4 primary health centres and 1 private nursing home with total 20 beds and 6 doctors (excluding private bodies). It had 24 family welfare subcentres. 676 patients were treated indoor and 158,858 patients were treated outdoor in the hospitals, health centres and subcentres of the CD Block.

Bagula Rural Hospital, with 30 beds at Bagula, is the major government medical facility in the Hanskhali CD block. There are primary health centres at Badkulla (with 10 beds), Ramnagar (with 6 beds), Hanskhali (with 6 beds) and Dakshinpara (10 beds).

Hanskhali CD Block is one of the areas of Nadia district where ground water is affected by moderate level of arsenic contamination. The WHO guideline for arsenic in drinking water is 10 mg/ litre, and the Indian Standard value is 50 mg/ litre. All the 17 blocks of Nadia district have arsenic contamination above this level. The maximum concentration in Hanskhali CD Block is 148 mg/litre.

== See also ==
- Hanskhali (Vidhan Sabha constituency)
