= Dhantala =

- Village
- Location in West Bengal, India Dhantala (India)
- Coordinates: 23.196751°N 88.626153°E
- Country: India
- State: West Bengal
- District: Nadia

Population (2011)
  - Total: 9,095

Languages
  - Official: Bengali, English
- Time zone: UTC+5:30 (IST)
- Telephone/STD code: 03454
- Lok Sabha constituency: Ranaghat
- Vidhan Sabha constituency: Ranaghat Uttar Purba
- Website: nadia.gov.in

Dhantala is a village in the Ranaghat II CD block in the Ranaghat subdivision of the Nadia district in the state of West Bengal, India. Here Dhantala flower market is very famous for natural flowers.

== Geography ==
Cities and towns in Ranaghat subdivision of Nadia district
M: municipal town/ city/notified area, CT: census town, R: rural/ urban centre.
Owing to space constraints in the small map, the actual locations in a larger map may vary slightly

=== Location ===
Dhantala is located at 23.196751°N 88.626153°E.

=== Area overview ===
Nadia district is mostly alluvial plains lying to the east of Hooghly River, locally known as Bhagirathi. The alluvial plains are cut across by such distributaries as Jalangi, Churni and Ichhamati. With these rivers getting silted up, floods are a recurring feature. The Ranaghat subdivision has the Bhagirathi on the west, with Purba Bardhaman and Hooghly districts lying across the river. Topographically, Ranaghat subdivision is spread across the Krishnanagar-Santipur Plain, which occupies the central part of the district, and the Ranaghat-Chakdaha Plain, the low-lying area found in the south-eastern part of the district. The Churni separates the two plains. A portion of the east forms the boundary with Bangladesh. The lower portion of the east is covered by a portion of the North 24 Parganas district. The subdivision has achieved reasonably high urbanisation. 41.68% of the population lives in urban areas and 58.32% lives in rural areas.

Note: The map alongside presents some of the notable locations in the subdivision. All places marked in the map are linked in the larger full screen map. All the four subdivisions are presented with maps on the same scale – the size of the maps vary as per the area of the subdivision.

== Demographics ==
According to the 2011 Census of India, Dhantala had a total population of 9,095, of which 4,730 (52%) were males and 4,365 (48%) were females. Population in the age range 0–6 years was 887. The total number of literate persons in Dhantala was 6,332 (77.14% of the population over 6 years).

== 2003 Dhantola rape, murder & dacoity case ==
At midnight on 5 February 2003 seven goons attacked two buses that were carrying marriage parties near a under construction madrasa at Beldanga village on Dhantala-Ainshmali road. A brick wall blockade was set up on the road, and a bus which was returning to Kuchiamora in North 24-Parganas after attending a marriage at Kamgachi in Ranaghat, was first attacked. The bus driver Samir Ghosh was killed, and the passengers were looted of their money and ornaments. The women in the bus were then dragged to a nearby field and six of them were raped. Meanwhile, another bus arrived at the spot, which was also carrying marriage party from Eruli and was returning from Sarishadanga, and the goons consisting of around 50 men carried out the same atrocities on the passengers. The horrific happenings went on until dawn the next day. Subsequently, two main accused, local CPI(M) leaders Subol Bagchi and Saidul Islam Karigar were arrested for orchestrating the entire incident. Another case associated with this incident was the murder of Chandan Sen, a surgeon at Ranaghat subdivisional hospital who had supposedly carried out medical tests on the rape victims. In 2009, Bagchi and Karigar, along with 15 other accused, were acquitted by the Ranaghat sessions court, while the remaining four, Chimu Sardar, Lodhai Sardar, Tuku Sardar and Kurban Ali Mondal were sentenced to life imprisonment.

== Civic administration ==
=== Police station ===
Dhantala and Gangnapur police stations have jurisdiction over Cooper's Camp and Ranaghat II CD block. The total area covered by the Dhantala police station is 206 km^{2} and the population covered is 180,725 (2001 census). 12 km of Bangladesh-India border is part of the PS area.

== Transport ==
Dhantala is on the Ranaghat-Duttapulia road.

Dhantala connects with Krishnanagar, Bangaon and Bangladesh through this road. Ranaghat-Dhantala-Krishnanagar, Ranaghat-Dhantala-Aishmali-Bangoan, Ranaghat-Dhantala-Majhdia bus services are available. TATA Magic, electric rickshaw are available for local transport.

Nearest railway stations are Ranaghat Junction railway station and Bankimnagar railway station.

== Education ==
Pritilata Waddedar Mahavidyalaya was established at Panikhali in 2007. It was founded as a women's college but later became co-educational. It is a government aided general degree college. Panchberia ITI college established in 2017.

== Healthcare ==
Aranghata Rural Hospital and Duttaphulia Rural Hospital, with 30 beds at Aranghata, is the major government medical facility in the Ranaghat II CD block.
