= Aranghata railway station =

Railway station in West Bengal, India

Aranghata
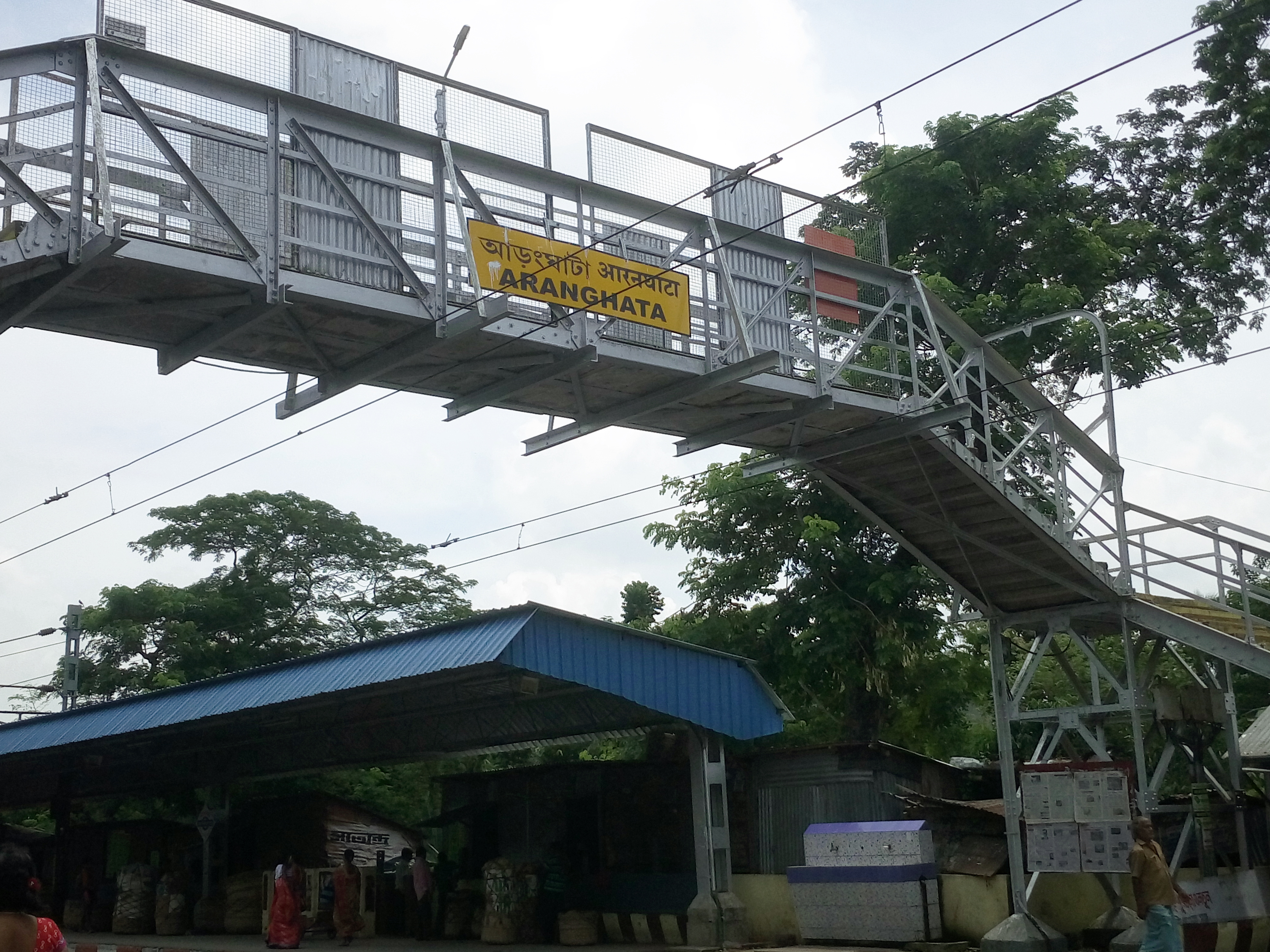
- Aranghata railway station

General information
- Location: Ranaghat Road, Aranghata, Nadia, West Bengal; India
- Coordinates: 23°14′34″N 88°36′50″E
- Elevation: 17 m (56 ft)
- System: Kolkata Suburban Railway
- Owner: Indian Railways
- Operator: Eastern Railway
- Line: Ranaghat–Gede line of Kolkata Suburban Railway
- Platforms: 2
- Tracks: 2

Construction
- Structure type: Standard (on ground station)
- Cycle facilities: Not available

Other information
- Status: Functioning
- Station code: AG
- Zone(s): Eastern Railway
- Division(s): Sealdah

History
- Opened: 1862
- Electrified: 1997–98
- Former names: Eastern Bengal Railway

Services
Preceding station	Kolkata Suburban Railway	Following station
Pancheberia towards Sealdah	Eastern Line Gede line	Bahirgachhi Halt towards Gede
Route map
Location
- Location within West Bengal Location within India

Aranghata railway station is a railway station on the Ranaghat–Gede line of the Kolkata Suburban Railway system and operated by Eastern Railway. It is situated beside Ranaghat Road, Sabdalpur, Aranghata of Nadia district in the Indian state of West Bengal. This railway station serves in Ranaghat II and Aranghata area.

== History ==
The Ranaghat–Gede section was the part of the Eastern Bengal Railway which was opened in 1862 and extended to Kushtia, now in Bangladesh. This was the Calcutta–Siliguri main line but after Partition of India in 1947, this got truncated and what remained India named the Gede branch line. The line including Aranghata railway station was electrified in 1997–98.
