= Bahirgachhi Halt railway station =

Railway station in West Bengal, India

Bahirgachhi Halt
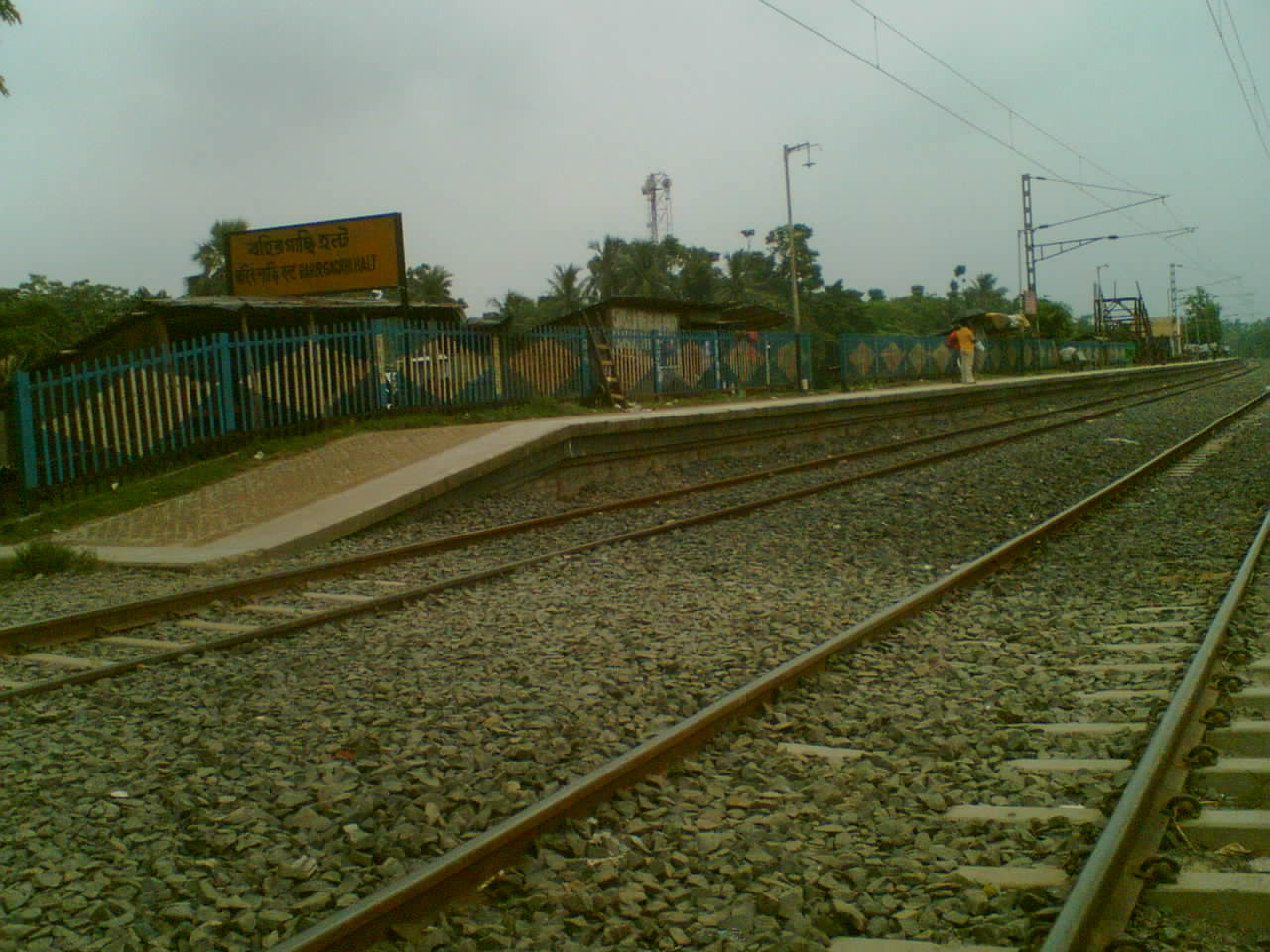
- Bahirgachi Halt railway station

General information
- Location: Bahirgachi, Nadia district, West Bengal; India
- Coordinates: 23°16′31″N 88°38′04″E
- Elevation: 16 m (52 ft)
- System: Kolkata Suburban Railway
- Owner: Indian Railways
- Operator: Eastern Railway
- Line: Ranaghat–Gede line of Kolkata Suburban Railway
- Platforms: 2
- Tracks: 2

Construction
- Structure type: At grade
- Parking: Not available
- Cycle facilities: Not available
- Accessible: Not available

Other information
- Status: Functional
- Station code: BHGH
- Zone(s): Eastern Railway
- Division(s): Sealdah

History
- Opened: 1862
- Electrified: 1965

Services
Preceding station	Kolkata Suburban Railway	Following station
Aranghata towards Sealdah	Eastern Line Ranaghat–Gede line	Shantinagar Halt towards Gede
Route map
Key
Location
- Location within West Bengal Location within India

Bahirgachhi Halt railway station is part of the Kolkata Suburban Railway system and operated by Eastern Railway. It is located on the Ranaghat–Gede line in Nadia in the Indian state of West Bengal.

== Gallery ==
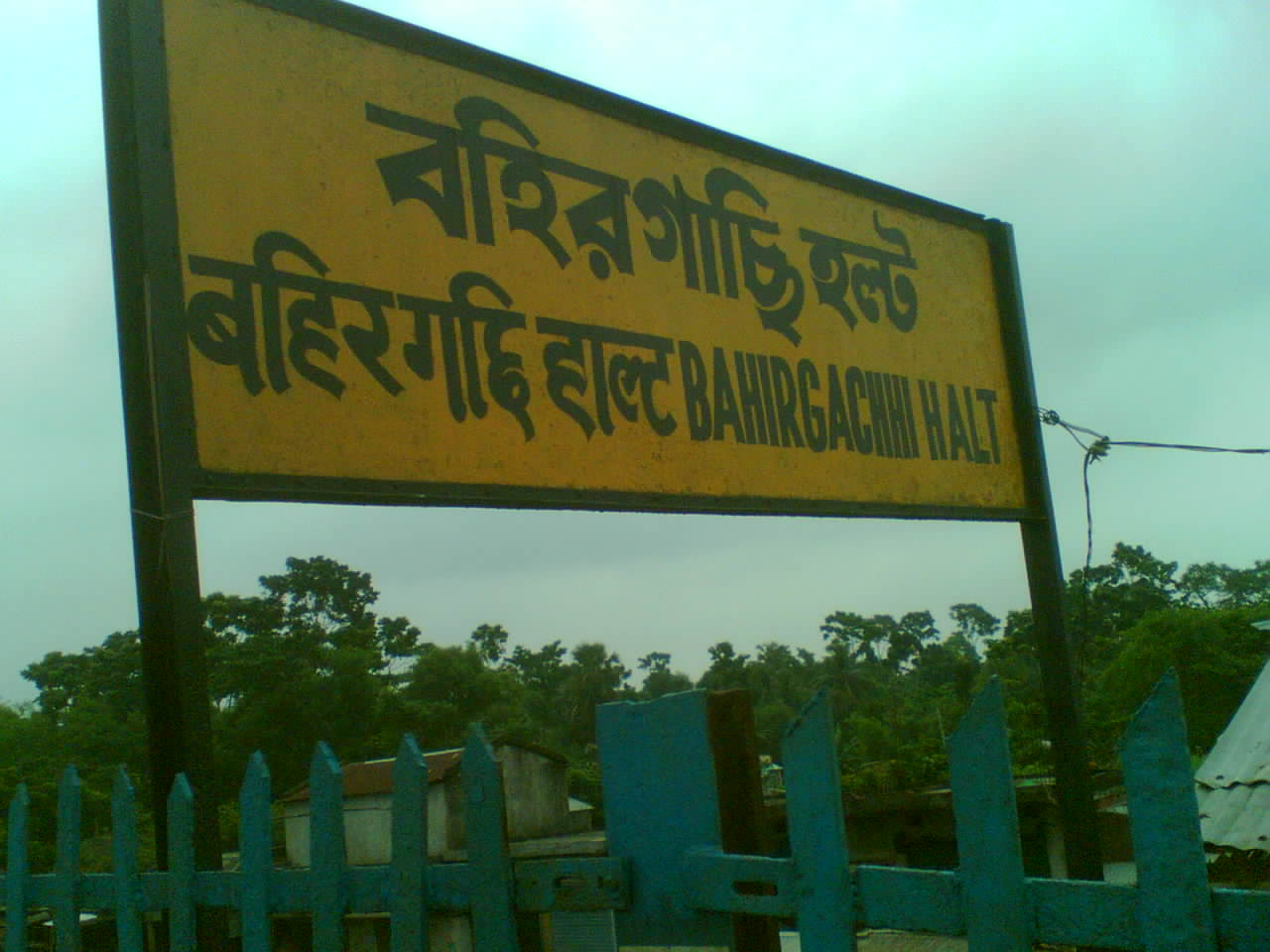
Bahirgachhi Halt Railway Station (Close View)

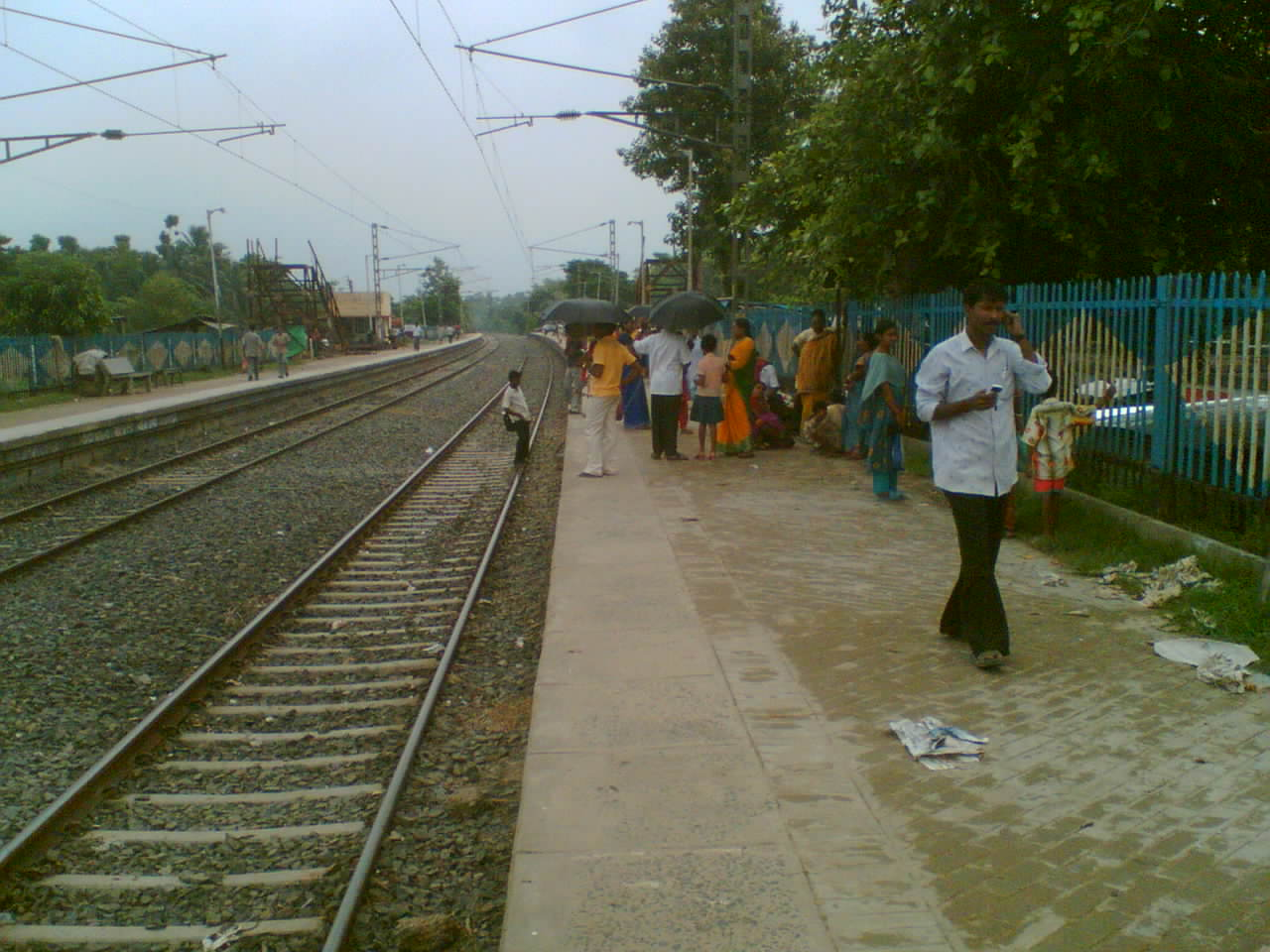
Bahirgachhi Halt Railway Station (Broad View)
