= Mayurhat =

- Village
- Location in West Bengal, India Mayurhat (India)
- Coordinates: 23.40026°N 88.73861°E
- Country: India
- State: West Bengal
- District: Nadia
- Founder: Sourav Sarkar

Government
  - Body: All India Trinamool Congress
  - MP: Tapash Mondal
- Elevation: 14 m (46 ft)

Population (2011)
  - Total: 2,355

Languages
  - Official: Bengali, English
- Time zone: UTC+5:30 (IST)
- Postal code: 741502
- Website: nadia.nic.in

Mayurhat is a village under Ranaghat subdivision in Nadia district, West Bengal, India.

== Geography ==
Mayurhat is in the middle of Bagula and Taraknagar. The village is located near Hanskhali, and falls under the jurisdiction of Mayurhat, Gram Panchayat and the Hanskhali Block Panchayat in Hanskhali District.

== Transport ==
The main transport is the railway service. Mayurhat railway station is situated on the Ranaghat-Gede branch line of the Sealdah railway division. Number of local trains stop at Mayurhat.

== Education ==
There is one high school and more than 4 primary schools.

== Festivals ==
Charak mala, Rath Yatra are the festivals organised in the village as well as the football and the cricket tournaments.

== Myths ==
There is an old story about a box which held 1,001 evil spirits and which was guarded by an old sage who could guard it no longer. He entrusted the box to the village of Mayurhat to keep watch on for all time. During the 101st year a demon tricked the guards and opened the box releasing all of the evil spirits. A young man shut the box just in time. It turns out that there was also a good spirit inside which was called Hope and the young man smiled at that reflecting on hope.
