= Ashim Biswas =

Ashim Biswas may refer to:

- Ashim Biswas (footballer)
- Ashim Biswas (politician)
