= Bahirgachi =

- Village
- Location in West Bengal, India Bahirgachi (India)
- Coordinates: 23°16′14″N 88°37′58″E
- Country: India
- State: West Bengal
- District: Nadia_district

Government
  - Type: Panchayati raj (India)
  - Body: Gram panchayat

Population (2011)
  - Total: 9,785

Languages
  - Official: Bengali, English
- Time zone: UTC+5:30 (IST)
- ISO 3166 code: IN-WB
- Vehicle registration: WB
- Coastline: 0 kilometres (0 mi)
- Website: wb.gov.in

Bahirgachi is a village in the Ranaghat II CD block in the Ranaghat subdivision of the Nadia district of West Bengal, India. It is known for the railway station (halt) which connects Gede, Ranaghat and Sealdah in Kolkata Suburban Railway system in Eastern Railway.

== Geography ==
It is located at 23°16′14″N 88°37′58″E.

Bahirgachi is 84 km north of Kolkata (Calcutta). It is connected to Aranghata, Bhaina, Bagula by road and rail.

Bahirgachi is a typical Bengali village with all basic amenities. The Bahirgachi Gram Panchayat includes a high school, a playground, a post office, a Grameen Bank, a telephone exchange, two Haat (local market), a railway station, and several primary schools.

== Administration ==
Krishnanagar is the district headquarters for Bahirgachi gram panchayat.

Ranaghat is sub-division, where the SDO is administrative head of the region.

The nearest police station is at Dhantala.

== Demographics ==
According to the 2011 Census of India, Bahirgachi had a total population of 9,785, of which 4,985 (51%) were males and 4,800 (49%) were females. Population in the age range 0–6 years was 801. The total number of literate persons in Bahirgachi was 7,245 (80.64% of the population over 6 years).

== Gallery ==
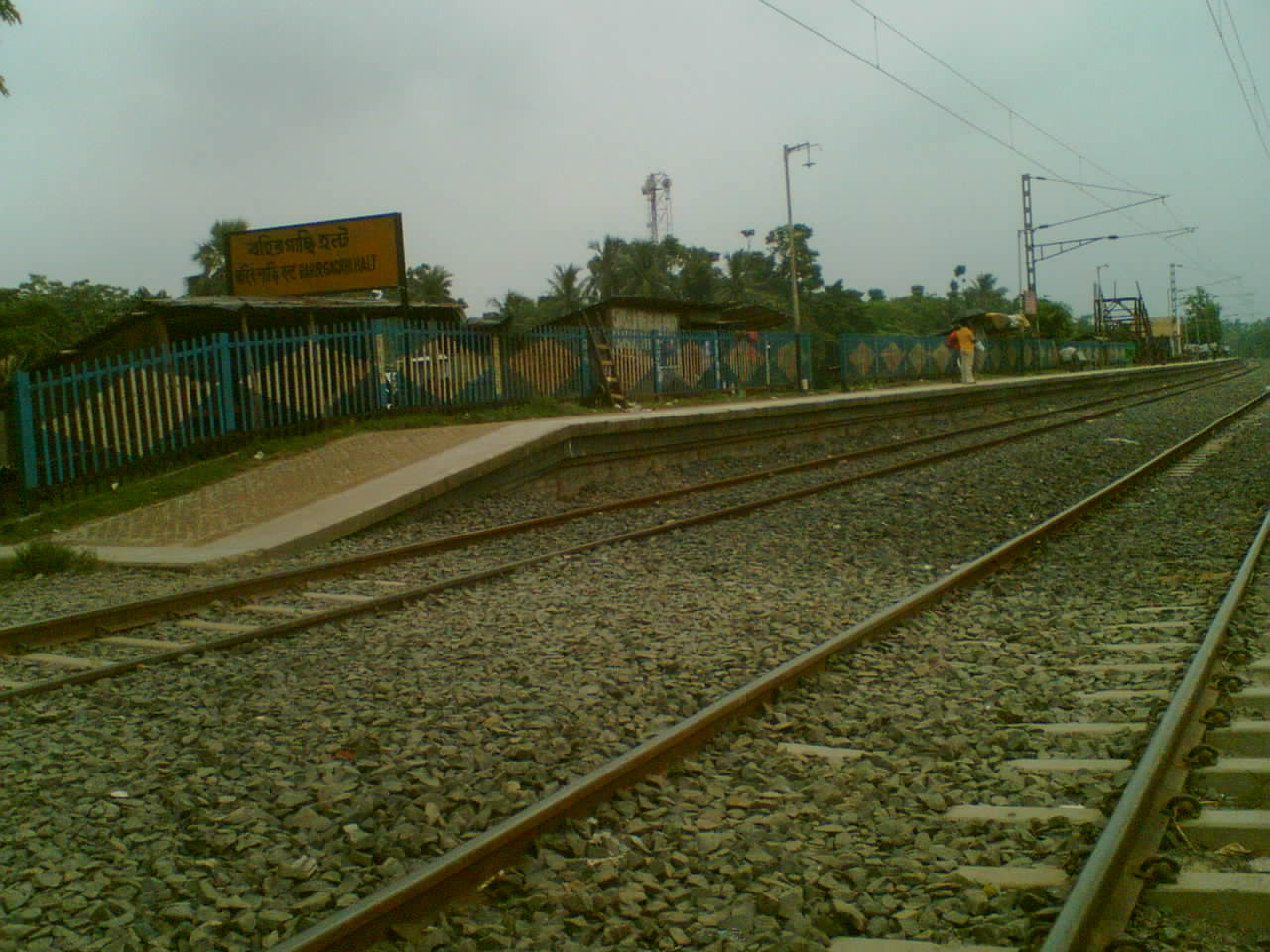
Bahirgachi Halt

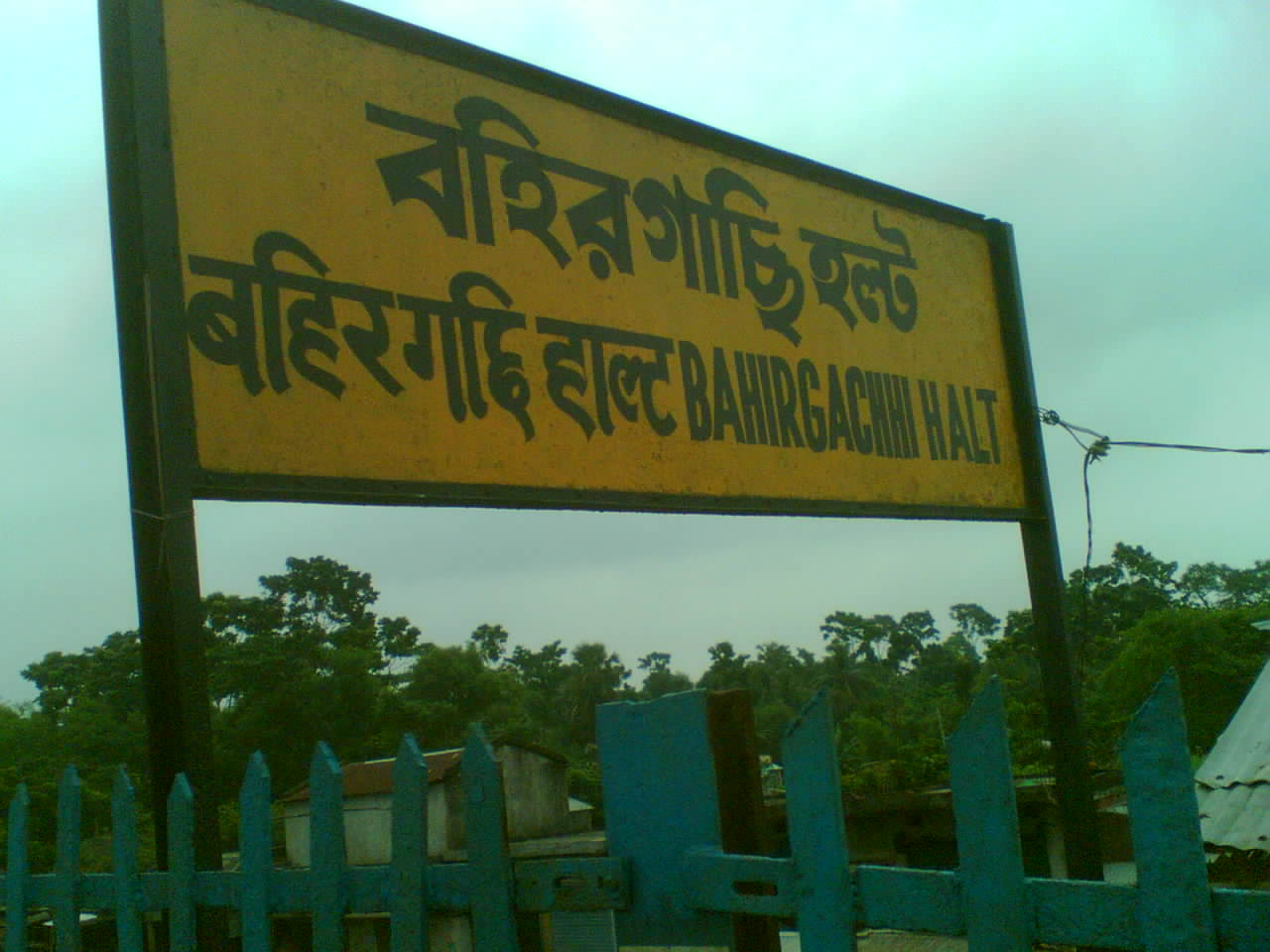
Bahirgachi Halt (Close View)

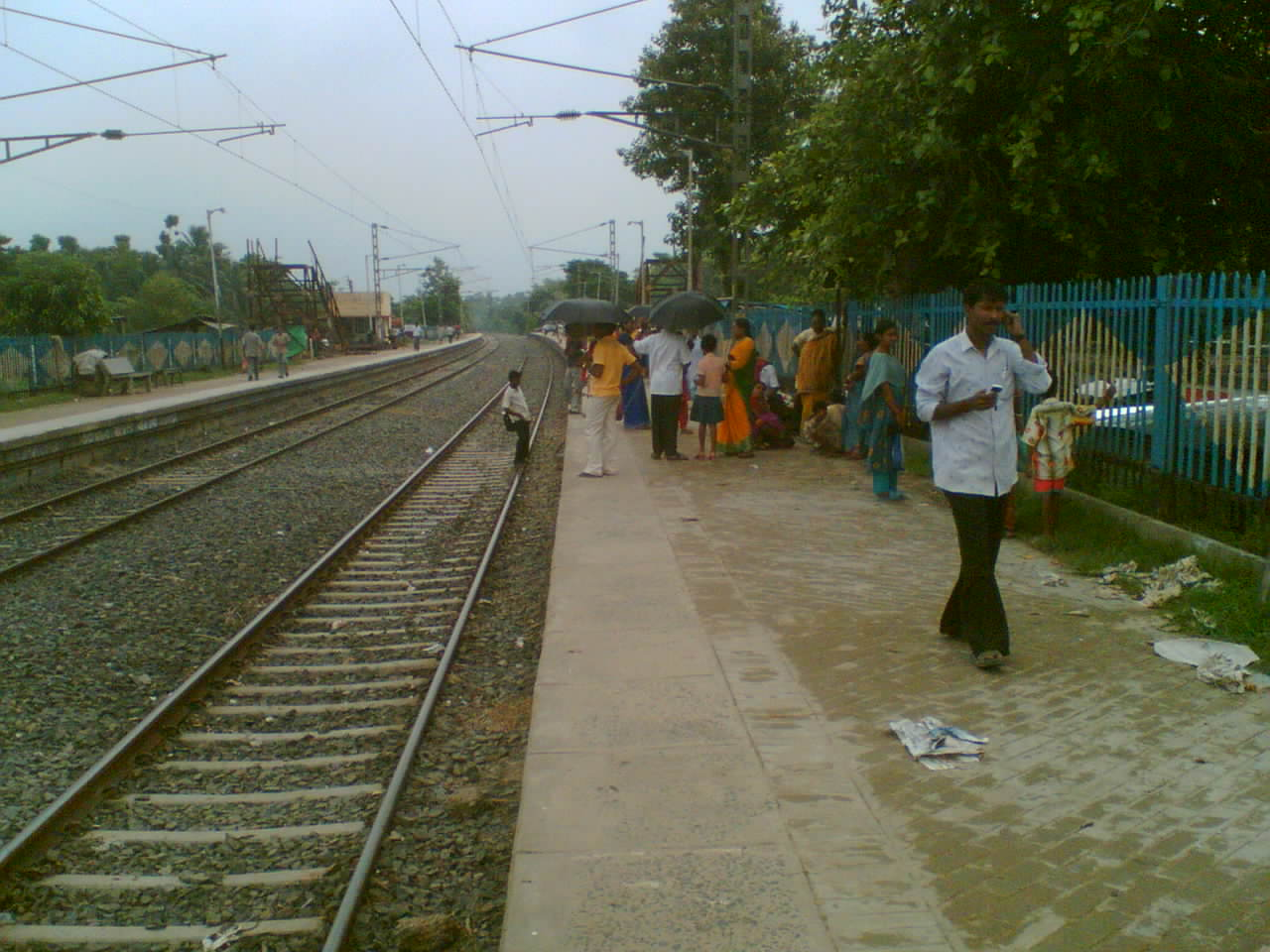
Bahirgachi Railway Station (Broad View)
