= Hanskhali rape case =

2022 child rape case in India

Hanskhali Rape Case
- Date: April 4, 2022
- Venue: Hanskhali, West Bengal, India
- Type: Crime against women, Gang rape
- Deaths: 1 (victim)
- Arrests: 3 (up to 17 April 2022)
- Suspects: Brojogopali Gayali (alias Sohail Gayali); Prabhakar Poddar
- Charges: Alleged gang-rape, destruction of evidence, conspiracy and aggravated sex (under IPC and Pocso Act)

On 4 April 2022, a 14-year-old girl was raped in Hanskhali, located in the Nadia district, West Bengal, India. The main parties accused are Brojogopali Gayali and his friends. Notably, they are associated with TMC.

== Incident and allegations ==
On 4 April 2022 at 4:00 pm Indian Standard Time (UTC+5:30), a 14-year-old girl, who was a student of class 9, went to a birthday party at the house of Brojogopal Gayali (alias Sohail Gayali), who is the son of AITC leader Samarendra Gayali. There, it is alleged that she was gang-raped by Sohail. With the help of two unknown men and a woman who self-identified to News18 as Polly Biswas, she reached home at 7:30 pm expressing that she had a headache. Her father stated that the two unknown men threatened to set their house on fire if they took the girl to the hospital. She died the next morning. Her mother alleged that within 30 minutes of her daughter's death, Sohail and other men attacked their home and again threatened to kill them, pointing a gun towards them. They then took away the body by wrapping it in a mat on which she was lying. Her mother stated, “They didn't allow us to touch the body. They set it on fire in front of my husband and threatened us with dire consequences if we raised our voice or informed others. We had no option but to mourn the death silently.” A villager who witnessed the young men trying to cremate the body said, “They were in a hurry to burn the body quickly but did not bring wood with them to set up a pyre. They frantically collected dry wood and dry leaves from a nearby bush. But as that was not enough to set up the pyre, they doused the body with kerosene to burn it.”

Her parents lodged the police complaint on 10 April.

== Reaction and role of the TMC Government ==
Mamata Banerjee, chief minister of West Bengal questioned the rape. She commented, "This story they are showing that a minor has died due to rape, Will you call it rape? Was she pregnant or had a love affair? I was told the girl had an affair with the boy.” She was heavily criticized for this comment from the intellectual society as well as public. National Commission for Women (NCW) chairperson Rekha Sharma and West Bengal Democratic Woman's Association leader Kaninika Bose slammed her for the comment. Even, Asha Devi, mother of Delhi rape victim Nirbhaya stated that she should not be CM if she had such mentality.

Multiple allegations were formed against the ruling TMC/AITC Government. Opposition leaders accused TMC for the broken law and order condition in state for which the rape case is proof. Also CPI(M) demanded answer on how the girl was cremated without any record.

== Investigation ==
Calcutta High Court has directed CBI to investigate the case. On 13 April, the West Bengal state agencies handed over the documents of the Hanskhali rape-murder case to a 3-member CBI team. The CBI is scheduled to submit the report to the Calcutta High Court on May 2. The CBI on 13 April filed an FIR for gang-rape, destruction of evidence, conspiracy and aggravated sex of IPC and Pocso Act. Sohail Gayali was arrested by the officials. Another one, who was present in the party a and is friend of the main suspect was also arrested. Responding to the accusation, additional superintendent of police, Ranaghat police district, Rupantar Sengupta, said: “We are trying to find out who intimidated the girl's parents as stated in a complaint. At the same time, the official status of the crematorium was being examined.”

According to Karuna, the incharge of the crematorium said no body was burnt there for many years. On 5 April, the body was taken there but before any introspection the body was burnt as they were in hurry and could not wait. The Police took Karuna to the additional chief judicial magistrate's court in Ranaghat where she recorded her statement.

CBI arrested the prime suspect Brojogopal Gayali under section 376 (3)/302/201/34 of IPC and 6 Pocso Act and took into custody of 14 days.

== Political and public response ==
The opposition parties like the Left parties and the BJP heavily criticized the incident and staged protests in different parts of the State. The CPIM state secretary Mohammed Salim said the incident as the "shadow of the Hathras rape" on Bengal.

West Bengal Governor, Jagdeep Dhankhar met Chief Secretary and Director General of West Bengal Police at the Raj Bhawan on April 10. He urged the Police "to take steps to curb the rising crimes against women; improve the worrisome law and order situation, and respond to pending issues”.

Bharatiya Janata Party created a five-member central team to enquire into the incident, which consisted Sreerupa Mitra Chaudhury, BJP MLA from English Bazar, MP Rekha Verma and Uttar Pradesh minister Baby Rani Maurya. TMC accused it as an attempt "to influence the CBI probe".

== Aftermath ==
On 15 April, on which day the rituals were to be done, the priests in the village did not came. Observers claimed that they were being stigmatised by some sections of society because she was allegedly raped. Local CPIM leaders arranged for a priest who finally performed the rituals in the evening. The priest Ashok Banerjee claimed he was also afraid due to TMC.
