= Asim Duttaroy =

Indian American medical scientist

Asim Kanti Duttaroy
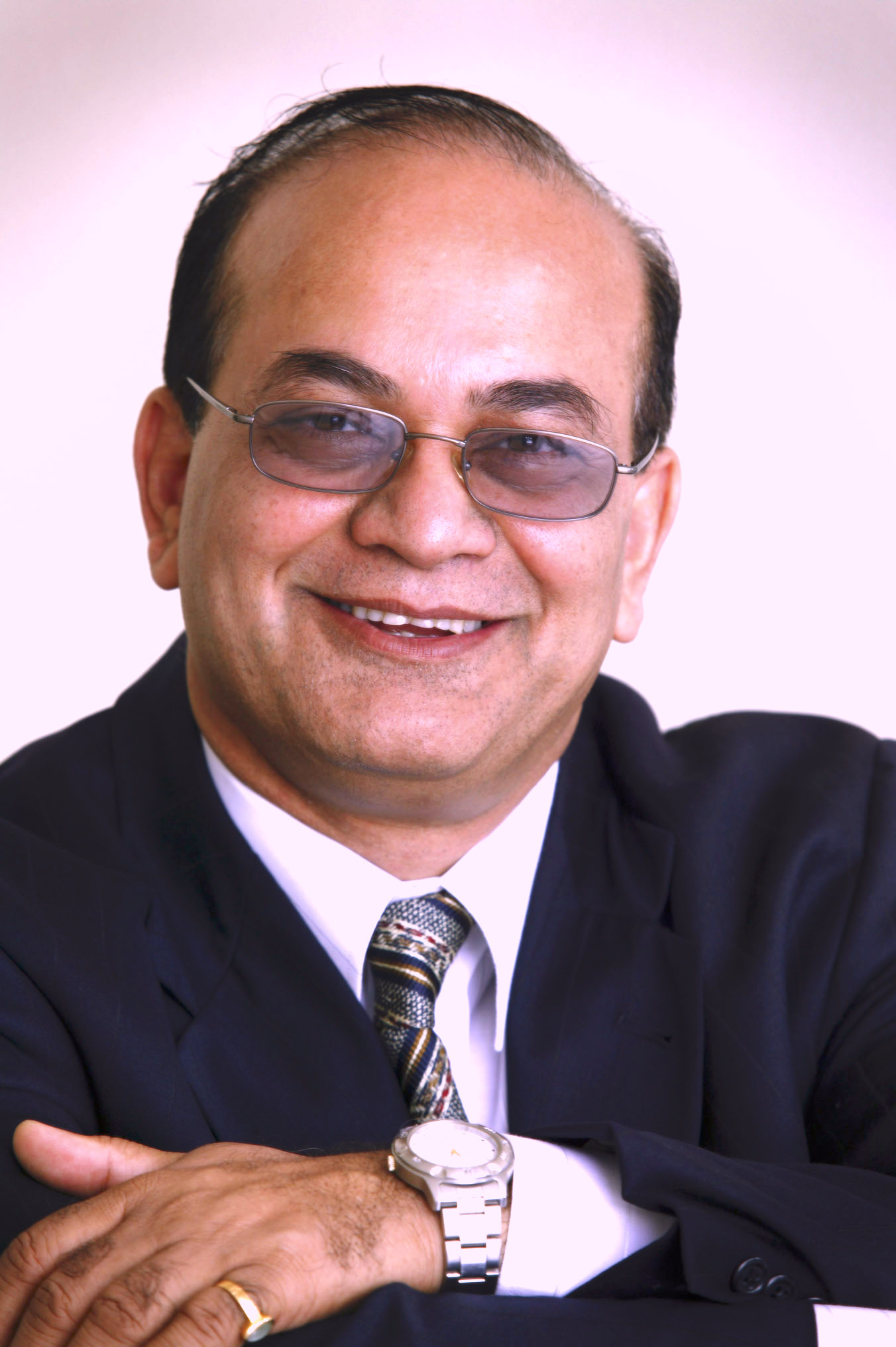
- Born: July 8, 1955 (age 71); Gangnapur, West Bengal, India
- Website: www.asimduttaroy.com

Asim K. Duttaroy is an Indian-born American medical scientist who, since 2001, has worked as a Professor at the Faculty of Medicine, University of Oslo, Norway. He was born in Gopinagar (Gangnapur), Nadia district, West Bengal, India.

Professor Duttaroy’s career represents a broad and sustained contribution to the study of nutrition, biology, and human health. His work spans platelet biology, vitamin E, fatty acid metabolism, maternal-fetal nutrition, placental transport, bioactive compounds in fruits, and the gut microbiome. Duttaroy is the author of over 550 research papers (h-index 70, i-10 index 246) and book chapters, has authored or edited several books, and holds several international patents. His research contributions have led to several industrial developments worldwide, such as Provexis. Duttaroy, while he worked as Professor (1990-2001) at the Rowett Research Institute at the University of Aberdeen, Scotland, United Kingdom, discovered that an extract from tomato had a positive effect in the prevention of blood platelet aggregation. Hyperactive platelets are important mediators of atherogenesis. In addition to their roles in thrombosis, antiplatelet drugs are not suitable for use where the risk of a cardiovascular event is relatively low. Therefore, it is essential to find alternative, safe antiplatelet inhibitors for the vulnerable population with hyperactive platelets in order to reduce the risk of cardiovascular disease. Potent antiplatelet factors were identified in water-soluble tomato extract (Fruitflow®), significantly inhibiting platelet aggregation. It became the first product in Europe to receive an approved health claim under Article 13(5) of the European Health Claims Regulation 1924/2006 and is now commercially available in over 75 countries.

Another area of his research has been the investigation of the fatty acid transport system in human placenta and its roles in the placental preferential transfer of critically important nutrients such as docosahexaenoic acid, 22:6n-3 (DHA) and arachidonic acid, 20:4n-6 (ARA) from the mother to the fetus. He demonstrated the presence of several plasma membrane-located transport/binding proteins, such as fatty acid translocase (FAT/CD36), plasma membrane fatty acid binding protein (FABPpm), fatty acid transport protein (FATP), and intracellular FABPs, in the human placenta. He identified that the placental-specific FABPpm is mainly responsible for the preferential placental transport of DHA and ARA from the mother to support fetal brain growth during the third trimester.

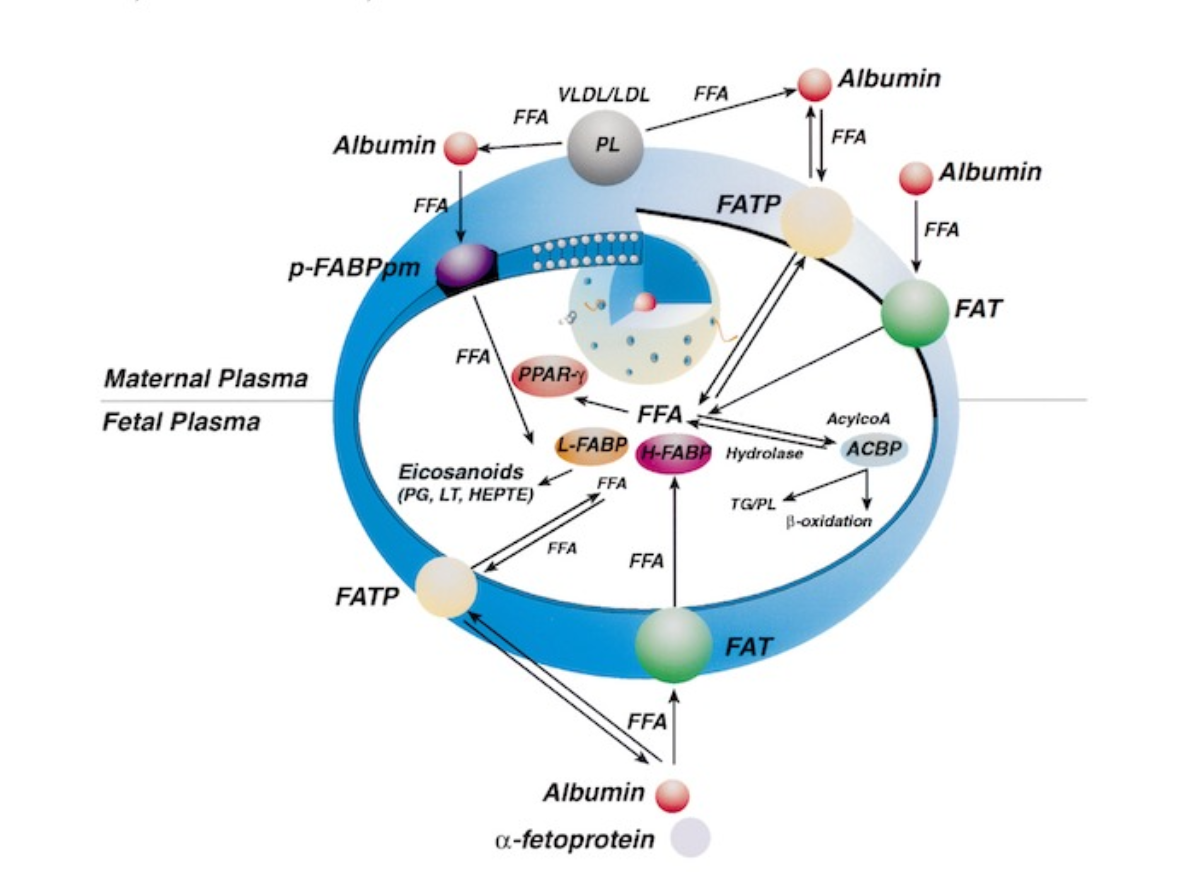
Schematic diagram of the putative roles of the placental plasma-membrane-associated and cytoplasmic FABPs in fatty acid uptake and metabolism in the placenta.

α-Tocopherol-Binding Protein: Vitamin E is transported in plasma mainly by lipoproteins, but little is known about how it is transported intracellularly. Duttaroy identified a new α-tocopherol-binding protein with a molecular mass of 14.2 kDa found in the cytosol of the heart and liver. This protein specifically binds α-tocopherol more than δ- and γ-homologues but does not bind oleate. The binding is quick, reversible, and saturable, indicating a specialized role in the intracellular transport and metabolism of α-tocopherol.^{1–4} The discovery of these binding proteins is vital for understanding how α-tocopherol is distributed within cells and tissues. Since α-tocopherol is a powerful antioxidant, proper localization is crucial for protecting cellular membranes from oxidative damage. Disruptions in the function of these binding proteins could weaken the protective effects of α-tocopherol, potentially leading to cellular problems and contributing to various diseases.

Duttaroy serves as Editor-In-Chief of the peer-reviewed journal Food & Nutrition Research, which has an Impact factor of 4.5 (2025). Duttaroy serves on the editorial boards of several other journals, including Prostaglandins Leukotrienes and Essential Fatty Acids, Nutrients, and European Journal of Lipid Science and Technology. Since 2022, Professor Duttaroy has been consistently ranked among the world's top 2% of scientists each year on Stanford/Elsevier's list.

In 2026, Duttaroy was included in Clarivate's Highly Cited Researchers list, which recognizes researchers whose publications have demonstrated significant influence in their respective fields. The selection is based on bibliometric analysis of publications indexed in the Web of Science Core Collection, complemented by qualitative assessment and expert evaluation.

== Legacy ==
Professor Duttaroy has made significant contributions to nutritional biochemistry, functional foods, the gut microbiome, and human health. His work focuses on identifying and characterizing bioactive compounds in natural foods and elucidating their mechanisms and potential health-promoting properties. His research focuses on how the placenta transports maternal plasma DHA and ARA to the fetus. The fetal brain development in utero is critically dependent on the maternal supply of these fatty acids in the utero. His studies have been documented through several articles. Besides, his articles have drawn many citations (Google Scholar PubMed). His other research area is cardioprotective factors in fruits and vegetables. He has discovered the anti-platelet factors from tomatoes. This discovery made by him is now widely known as Fruitflow. In 2009, Fruitflow® became the first product in Europe to obtain an approved, proprietary health claim under Article 13(5) of the European Health Claims Regulation 1924/2006 on nutrition and health claims made on foods. The EU Commission authorized the health claim "water-soluble tomato concentrate (WSTC) I and II help maintain normal platelet aggregation, which contributes to healthy blood flow." Fruitflow® is now widely available in different countries worldwide.

== Books ==
- Duttaroy, Asim K.; Spener, Friedrich (October 2003). Cellular Proteins and Their Fatty Acids in Health and Disease. Wiley-VCH, Germany. pp. 1–478. ISBN 978-3-527-60528-6.
- Duttaroy, Asim K.; Basak, Sanjay (October 2016). Human Placental Trophoblasts: Impact of Maternal Nutrition. CRC Press, USA. pp. 1–437. ISBN 978-1-4822-5428-0.
- Duttaroy, Asim K.; Basak, Sanjay (October 2017). Early Nutrition and Lifestyle Factors: Effects on First Trimester Placenta. Springer. pp. 1–159. doi:10.1007/978-3-319-38804-5. ISBN 978-3-319-38802-1.
- Duttaroy, Asim K. (June 2018). Nutraceuticals and Human Blood Platelet Function: Applications in Cardiovascular Health. Wiley. pp. 1–300. ISBN 978-1-119-37601-9.Duttaroy, Asim K. (July 2021). Evidence-Based Nutrition and Clinical Evidence of Bioactive Foods in Human Health and Disease. Elsevier. pp. 1–462. ISBN 978-0-128-22405-2.
- Duttaroy, Asim K. (July 2021). Maternal DHA Impact on Child Neurodevelopment. MPDI. pp. 1–115. ISBN 978-3-0365-1615-8.
- Pathak, Surajit; Banerjee, Antara; Duttaroy, Asim K. (July 2023). Evidence-based Functional Foods for Prevention of Age-related Diseases. Springer Singapore. pp. 1–371. doi:10.1007/978-981-99-0534-8. ISBN 978-981-99-0533-1.
- Duttaroy, Asim K.; Mallick, Rahul (July 2024). Cellular, Molecular, and Environmental Contribution in Cardiac Remodeling From Lab Bench to Clinical Perspective. Elsevier. pp. 1–500. ISBN 9780323995702.
- Duttaroy, Asim K. (October 2024). Fatty Acid-Binding Proteins and Their Roles in Human Health and Disease From Basic Science to Clinical Application. Elsevier. pp. 1–400. ISBN 9780323957007.
