= Shantinagar Halt railway station =

Railway station in West Bengal, India

Shantinagar Halt

General information
- Location: Shantinagar, Nadia, West Bengal; India
- Coordinates: 23°17′35″N 88°38′17″E
- Elevation: 13 metres (43 ft)
- System: Kolkata Suburban Railway station
- Owner: Indian Railways
- Operator: Eastern Railway
- Line: Ranaghat–Gede line of Kolkata Suburban Railway
- Platforms: 2
- Tracks: 2

Construction
- Structure type: At grade
- Parking: Not available
- Cycle facilities: Not available
- Accessible: Not available

Other information
- Status: Functional
- Station code: SNTN
- Zone(s): Eastern Railway
- Division(s): Sealdah

History
- Opened: 1862
- Electrified: 1965

Services
Preceding station	Kolkata Suburban Railway	Following station
Bahirgachhi Halt towards Sealdah	Eastern Line Gede line	Bhayna towards Gede
Route map
Location
- Location within West Bengal Location within India

Shantinagar Halt railway station is part of the Kolkata Suburban Railway system and operated by Eastern Railway. It is located on the Ranaghat–Gede line in Nadia in the Indian state of West Bengal.
