= Gazna, Nadia =

Gazna
- Village
- Location in West Bengal, India Gazna (India)
- Coordinates: 23.3726°N 88.7097°E
- Country: India
- State: West Bengal
- District: Nadia

Government
  - MP: Sucharu Ranjan Haldar
- Elevation: 7 m (23 ft)

Languages
  - Official: Bengali, English
- Time zone: UTC+5:30 (IST)
- PIN: 741507
- Telephone code: 91--xxxxx
- ISO 3166 code: IN-WB
- Vehicle registration: WB-52
- Lok Sabha constituency: Ranaghat

Gazna is a village located in Nadia District, West Bengal, India. The village and its bazaar are called "Gazna Bazaar".

== Education ==
There is a high school named Gazna High School and more than four primary schools. High school stream is 10 + 2 also known as higher secondary. Students come from Gazna and nearby villages such as Khantura, Chunari, and Bhjanghat.

== Transport ==
Gazna Bazar is connected to Bagula and Majhdia with bus service on Gazna Road. Taraknagar-Gazna Road connects Gazna with Taraknagar rail station. Buses, cars, and country vans operate on these routes.

== Culture and activities ==
Gazna hosts the week-long Rasjatra festival managed by the Gazna Bazaar Committee. Cricket, football tournaments and social drama are organised here.
