= Samir Kumar Poddar =

Indian politician

Member of the West Bengal Legislative Assembly
- In office 2011–2021
- Preceded by: Debendra Nath Biswas and Aloke Kumar Das
- Succeeded by: Ashim Biswas
- Constituency: Ranaghat Uttar Purba

Personal details
- Party: All India Trinamool Congress
- Occupation: Politician

Samir Kumar Poddar is an Indian Politician from the state of West Bengal. He is a two term member of the West Bengal Legislative Assembly.

== Constituency ==
He represented the Ranaghat Uttar Purba (Vidhan Sabha constituency) from 2011 to 2021.

== Political Party ==
He is from the All India Trinamool Congress.
