= Food & Nutrition Research =

- Discipline: Nutrition science
- Language: English
- Edited by: Asim Duttaroy

Publication details
- Former names: Näringsforskning, Scandinavian Journal of Nutrition, Scandinavian Journal of Food and Nutrition
- History: 1996-present
- Publisher: Swedish Nutrition Foundation
- Frequency: Annual
- Impact factor: 4.5 (2025)

Standard abbreviations
- ISO 4: Food Nutr. Res.

Indexing
- ISSN: 1654-6628 (print); 1654-661X (web)
- OCLC no.: 967809037

Links
- Journal homepage

Food & Nutrition Research is an annual peer-reviewed open access medical journal covering nutrition and food science. It was established in 1996 as Näringsforskning, and was renamed the Scandinavian Journal of Nutrition in 2002. In 2006, the journal was renamed again, this time to the Scandinavian Journal of Food and Nutrition; it obtained its current name in 2008. It is published by the Swedish Nutrition Foundation in cooperation with Open Academia, and the editor-in-chief is Asim Duttaroy (University of Oslo). According to the Journal Citation Reports, the journal has a 2025 impact factor of 4.5.

== See also ==
- Open access in Sweden
