= Gangnapur =

- Census town
- Location in West Bengal, India Gangnapur (India)
- Coordinates: 23.130861°N 88.641167°E
- Country: India
- State: West Bengal
- District: Nadia

Government
  - Type: Panchayet

Population (2011)
  - Total: 10,168

Languages
  - Official: Bengali, English
- Time zone: UTC+5:30 (IST)
- PIN: 741238
- Telephone/STD code: 03473
- Lok Sabha constituency: Ranaghat
- Vidhan Sabha constituency: Ranaghat Dakshin
- Website: nadia.gov.in

Gangnapur is a census town in the Ranaghat II CD block in the Ranaghat subdivision of the Nadia district in the state of West Bengal, India.

== Geography ==
Cities and towns in Ranaghat subdivision of Nadia district
M: municipal town/ city/notified area, CT: census town, R: rural/ urban centre.
Owing to space constraints in the small map, the actual locations in a larger map may vary slightly

=== Location ===
Gangnapur is located at 23.130861°N 88.641167°E

=== Area overview ===
NORTH 24 PGS district is mostly alluvial plains lying to the east of Hooghly River, locally known as Bhagirathi. The alluvial plains are cut across by such distributaries as Jalangi, Churni and Ichhamati. With these rivers getting silted up, floods are a recurring feature. The Ranaghat subdivision has the Bhagirathi on the west, with Purba Bardhaman and Hooghly districts lying across the river. Topographically, Ranaghat subdivision is spread across the Krishnanagar-Santipur Plain, which occupies the central part of the district, and the Ranaghat-Chakdaha Plain, the low-lying area found in the south-eastern part of the district. The Churni separates the two plains. A portion of the east forms the boundary with Bangladesh. The lower portion of the east is covered by a portion of the North 24 Parganas district. The subdivision has achieved reasonably high urbanisation. 41.68% of the population lives in urban areas and 58.32% lives in rural areas.

Note: The map alongside presents some of the notable locations in the subdivision. All places marked in the map are linked in the larger full screen map. All the four subdivisions are presented with maps on the same scale – the size of the maps vary as per the area of the subdivision.

== Demographics ==
According to the 2011 Census of India, Gangnapur had a total population of 10,168, of which 5,102 (50%) were males and 5,066 (50%) were females. Population in the age range 0–6 years was 876. The total number of literate persons in Gangnapur was 6,332 (85.87% of the population over 6 years). Some people says It was established by King Debol.

== Civic administration ==
=== Police station ===
Gangnapur police stations have jurisdiction over Cooper's Camp and Ranaghat II CD block. The total area covered by the Gangnapur police station is 102 km^{2} and the population covered is 299,411 (2001 census).

== Infrastructure ==
According to the District Census Handbook 2011, Nadia, Gangnapur covered an area of 3.3634 km^{2}. Among the civic amenities, it had 17 km roads with open drains, the protected water supply involved overhead tank, hand pump. It had 500 domestic electric connections, 120 road light points. Among the medical facilities, it had 1 dispensary/ health centre. Among the educational facilities it had 6 primary schools, 2 middle schools, 2 secondary schools, 2 senior secondary schools. It had 1 non-formal education centre (Sarva Siksha Abhiyan). Among the social, recreational and cultural facilities it had 1 auditorium/ community hall, 1 public library. Two important commodities it produced were mustard oil, gloves. It had branch office of 1 nationalised bank.

== Notable people ==
- Asim Duttaroy, a Medical Scientist
- Hiramay Sarkar, an Artist, Educator

== Transport ==
Gangnapur is on the Aismali-Chakdaha Road.

Gangnapur is a station on the Ranaghat-Bangaon line. It is around 10 km from Ranaghat.
