= Aranghata =

- Village
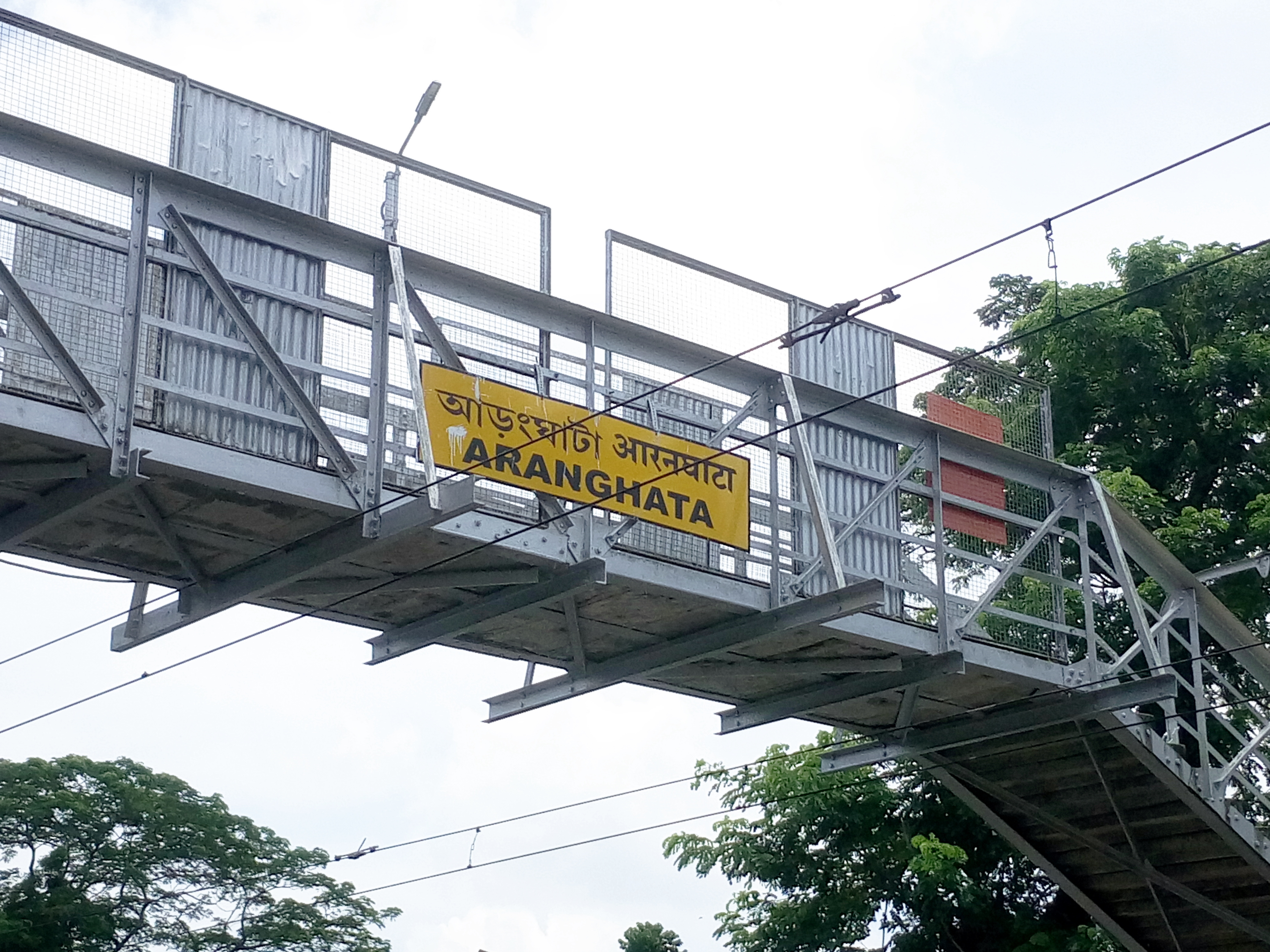
- Aranghata railway station
- Interactive map of Aranghata
- Coordinates: 23°14′34.03″N 88°36′27.87″E
- Country: India
- State: West Bengal
- District: Nadia

Area
  - Total: 17.525 km^{2} (6.766 sq mi)

Population
  - Total: 21,552
  - Density: 1,229.8/km^{2} (3,185.1/sq mi)

Languages
  - Official: Bengali, Hindi English
- Time zone: UTC+5:30 (IST)
- PIN: 741501

Aranghata is a village and a gram panchayat in the Ranaghat II CD block in the Ranaghat subdivision of the Nadia district, West Bengal, India. It is situated 78 km (48 mi) north of Calcutta and about 9 km (5.6 mi) north of Ranaghat town.

== Geography ==
Cities and towns in Ranaghat subdivision of Nadia district
M: municipal town/ city/notified area, CT: census town, R: rural/ urban centre.
Owing to space constraints in the small map, the actual locations in a larger map may vary slightly

=== Location ===
Aranghata is located at 23°14′34.03″N 88°36′27.87″E.

=== Area overview ===
Nadia district is mostly alluvial plains lying to the east of Hooghly River, locally known as Bhagirathi. The alluvial plains are cut across by such distributaries as Jalangi, Churni and Ichhamati. With these rivers getting silted up, floods are a recurring feature. The Ranaghat subdivision has the Bhagirathi on the west, with Purba Bardhaman and Hooghly districts lying across the river. Topographically, Ranaghat subdivision is spread across the Krishnanagar-Santipur Plain, which occupies the central part of the district, and the Ranaghat-Chakdaha Plain, the low-lying area found in the south-eastern part of the district. The Churni separates the two plains. A portion of the east forms the boundary with Bangladesh. The lower portion of the east is covered by a portion of the North 24 Parganas district. The subdivision has achieved reasonably high urbanisation. 41.68% of the population lives in urban areas and 58.32% lives in rural areas.

Note: The map alongside presents some of the notable locations in the subdivision. All places marked in the map are linked in the larger full screen map. All the four subdivisions are presented with maps on the same scale – the size of the maps vary as per the area of the subdivision.

== Demographics ==
According to the 2011 Census of India, Aranghata Narayanpur had a total population of 21,552, of which 11,064 (51%) were males and 10,448 (49%) were females. Population in the age range 0–6 years was 1,976. The total number of literate persons in Aranghata Narayanpur was 15,806 (80.74% of the population over 6 years).

== Transport ==
Aranghata is served by the Ranaghat railway station. Ranaghat Junction is a major station on the Sealdah-Gede railway section. Other than rail transport through Aranghata railway station in Sealdah - Gede branch line, the village also has bus route to Ranaghat, Nrishangopur Ghat, Mayapur, Boira (north 24 Paragans), Duttaphulia, and district sadar Krishnanagar. The Churni river connects to Hanshkhali, Mamjoan.

== Education ==
Pritilata Waddedar Mahavidyalaya was established at Panikhali in 2007. It was founded as a women's college but later became co-educational. It is a government aided general degree college.

== Culture ==
Aranghata is famous for its Jugol Kishore Mela on the bank of the Churni River and the Hindu festival Kali Puja. Maha Samsan Ghat (burning ghat) is also on the bank of the river. People of Bahirgachhi, Panchberia, Salua, Bankimnagar, Bhaina, Bahirgachi, Math narayanpur do trades in Aranghata Bazar. This place is known for country culture also.

== Healthcare ==
Aranghata Rural Hospital, with 30 beds at Aranghata, is the major government medical facility in the Ranaghat II CD block.
