= Ranaghat II =

- Community development block
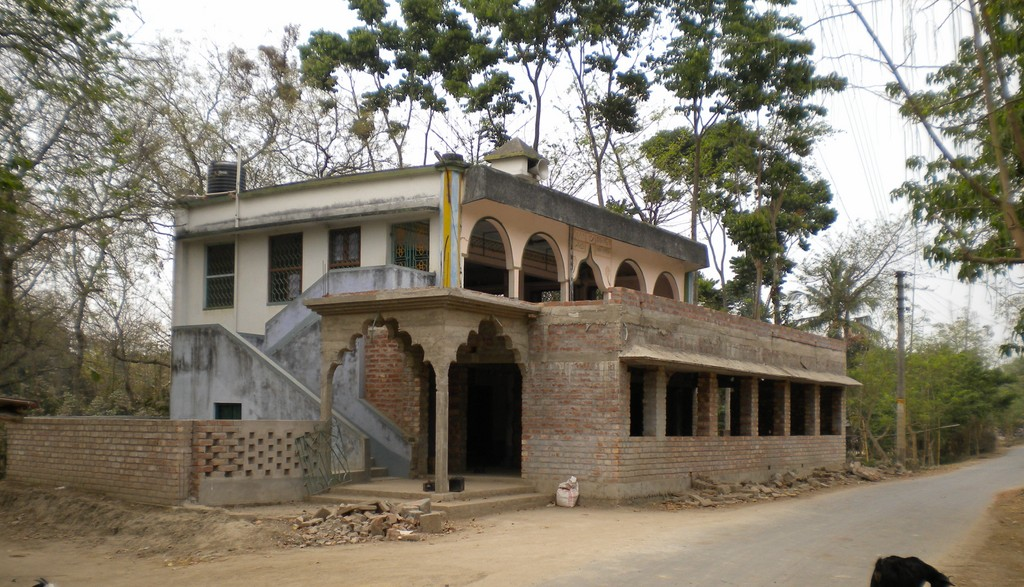
- Rakhalgachi Mosque, Ranaghat II

- Coordinates: 23.1827510°N 88.5948490°E
- Country: India
- State: West Bengal
- District: Nadia

Government
  - Type: Community development block

Area
  - Total: 279.03 km^{2} (107.73 sq mi)
- Elevation: 13 m (43 ft)

Population (2011)
  - Total: 368,681
  - Density: 1,321.3/km^{2} (3,422.1/sq mi)

Languages
  - Official: Bengali, English

Literacy (2011)
  - Total literates: 264,947 (79.38%)
- Time zone: UTC+5:30 (IST)
- PIN: 741253 (Aishmali); 741501 (Arangahta); 741202 (Nasra)
- Telephone/STD code: 03473
- Vehicle registration: WB-51, WB-52
- Lok Sabha constituency: Ranaghat
- Vidhan Sabha constituency: Ranaghat Dakshin, Ranaghat Uttar Purba
- Website: nadia.nic.in

Ranaghat II is a community development block that forms an administrative division in Ranaghat subdivision of Nadia district in the Indian state of West Bengal.

== Geography ==
Nokari is located at 23°10′58″N 88°35′41″E.

Ranaghat II CD Block is bounded by Hanskhali in the north, Jhikargachha Upazila in Jessore District of Bangladesh and Bagdah CD Block in North 24 Parganas district, in the east, Chakdaha CD Block in the south and Ranaghat I CD Block in the west.

Nadia district is mostly alluvial plains lying to the east of Hooghly River, locally known as the Bhagirathi. The alluvial plains are cut across by distributaries such as the Jalangi, Churni and Ichhamati. With these rivers getting silted up, floods are a recurring feature.

Ranaghat II CD Block has an area of 279.03 km^{2}. It has 1 panchayat samity, 14 gram panchayats, 285 gram sansads (village councils), 113 mouzas and 108 inhabited villages. Dhantala and Gangnapur police stations serve this block. Headquarters of this CD Block is at Nokari. It is located 30 km from Krishnanagar, the district headquarters.

Gram panchayats of Ranaghat II block/ panchayat samiti are: Anishmali, Aranghata, Bahirgachhi, Baidyapur I, Baidyapur II, Debagram, Duttapulia, Jugalkishore, Kamalpur, Majhergram, Nokari, Raghunathpur Hijuli I, Raghunathpur Hijuli II and Shyamnagar.

== Demographics ==
=== Population ===
As per the 2011 Census of India, Ranaghat II CD Block had a total population of 368,681, of which 314,519 were rural and 54,162 were urban. There were 189,706 (51%) males and 178,975 (49%) females. Population below 6 years was 34,931, Scheduled Castes numbered 174,717 (47.39%) and Scheduled Tribes numbered 16,185 (4.39%).

As per the 2001 census, Ranaghat II block had a total population 330,292, out of which 169,142 were males and 161,150 were females. Ranaghat II block registered a population growth of 15.32 per cent during the 1991-2001 decade. Decadal growth for the district was 19.51 per cent. Decadal growth in West Bengal was 17.84 per cent.

There are several census towns in Ranaghat II CD Block (2011 census figures in brackets): Halalpur Krishnapur (5,202), Hijuli (13,969), Ranaghat (CT) (3,982), Nasra (10,707), Gangnapur (10,168) and Belgharia (5,858).

There is one outgrowth in Ranaghat II CD Block (2011 census figure in brackets): Magurkhali (Ward No.13)(4,276).

Large villages (with 4,000+ population) in Ranaghat II CD Block are (2011 census figures in brackets): Debagram (7,060), Matikumra (8,077), Dayabari (6,500), Nokari (5,032), Raynagar (4,826), Gopinagar Baghadanga (5,616), Korabari (4,108), Arranghata Narayanpur (21,552), Sabdalpur (4,737), Daula (5,632), Dhantala (9,095), Sankarpur (4,716), Kamalpur (4,587), Duttapulia (13,562), Bahirgachi (9,785), Barabaria (9,356), Aismali (6,855), Chapra (4,014), Humnipota (4,081) and Gangsara (4,270).

Other villages in Ranaghat II CD Block include (2011 census figures in brackets): Baidyapur (3,044) and Raghunathpur (3,277).

=== Literacy ===
As per the 2011 census, the total number of literates in Ranaghat II CD Block was 264,947 (79.38% of the population over 6 years) out of which males numbered 143,773 (83.66% of the male population over 6 years) and females numbered 121,174 (74.85% of the female population over 6 years). The gender disparity (the difference between female and male literacy rates) was 8.81%.

See also – List of West Bengal districts ranked by literacy rate

Literacy in CD blocks of
Nadia district
Tehatta subdivision
Karimpur I – 67.70%
Karimpur II – 62.04%
Tehatta I – 70.72%
Tehatta II – 68.52%
Krishnanagar Sadar subdivision
Kaliganj – 65.89%
Nakashipara – 64.86%
Chapra – 68.25%
Krishnanagar I – 71.45%
Krishnanagar II – 68.52%
Nabadwip – 67.72%
Krishnaganj – 72.86%
Ranaghat subdivision
Hanskhali – 80.11%
Santipur – 73.10%
Ranaghat I – 77.61%
Ranaghat II – 79.38%
Kalyani subdivision
Chakdaha – 64.17%
Haringhata – 82.15%
Source: 2011 Census: CD Block Wise
Primary Census Abstract Data

=== Language and religion ===
Religion in Ranaghat II CD block (2011)
Hinduism	85.65%
Islam	12.59%
Christianity	1.64%
Other or not stated	0.12%

In the 2011 census, Hindus numbered 312,111 and formed 85.65% of the population in Ranaghat II CD Block. Muslims numbered 45,887 and formed 12.59% of the population. Christians numbered 5956 and formed 1.64% of the population. Others numbered 451 and formed 0.12% of the population.

In the 2001 census, Hindus numbered 480,008 and formed 89.28% of the combined population of Ranaghat I and Ranaghat II CD Blocks. Muslims numbered 50,640 and formed 9.42% of the combined population. In the 1991 census, Hindus numbered 438,924 and formed 93.50% of the combined population of Ranaghat I and Ranaghat II CD Blocks. Muslims numbered 24,349 and formed 5.19% of the combined population.

Bengali is the predominant language, spoken by 99.21% of the population.

== Rural poverty ==
The District Human Development Report for Nadia has provided a CD Block-wise data table for Modified Human Vulnerability Index of the district. Ranaghat II CD Block registered 29.02 on the MHPI scale. The CD Block-wise mean MHVI was estimated at 33.92. A total of 8 out of the 17 CD Blocks in Nadia district were found to be severely deprived when measured against the CD Block mean MHVI - Karimpur I and Karimpur II (under Tehatta subdivision), Kaliganj, Nakashipara, Chapra, Krishnanagar I and Nabadwip (under Krishnanagar Sadar subdivision) and Santipur (under Ranaghat subdivision) appear to be backward.

As per the Human Development Report 2004 for West Bengal, the rural poverty ratio in Nadia district was 28.35%. The estimate was based on Central Sample data of NSS 55th round 1999–2000.

== Economy ==
=== Livelihood ===
In Ranaghat II CD Block in 2011, amongst the class of total workers, cultivators formed 22.87%, agricultural labourers 31.06, household industry workers 5.57% and other workers 40.50%.

The southern part of Nadia district starting from Krishnanagar I down to Chakdaha and Haringhata has some urban pockets specialising in either manufacturing or service related economic activity and has reflected a comparatively higher concentration of population but the urban population has generally stagnated. Nadia district still has a large chunk of people living in the rural areas.

=== Infrastructure ===
There are 108 inhabited villages in Ranaghat II CD Block. 100% villages have power supply and drinking water supply. 24 Villages (22.22%) have post offices. 107 villages (99.07%) have telephones (including landlines, public call offices and mobile phones). 52 villages (48.15%) have a pucca approach road and 51 villages (47.22%) have transport communication (includes bus service, rail facility and navigable waterways). 12 villages (11.11%) have agricultural credit societies and 17 villages (15.74%) have banks. However, although 100% villages in Nadia district had power supply in 2011, a survey in 2007-08 revealed that less than 50% of households had electricity connection. In rural areas of the country, the tube well was for many years considered to be the provider of safe drinking water, but with arsenic contamination of ground water claiming public attention it is no longer so. Piped water supply is still a distant dream. In 2007–08, the availability of piped drinking water in Nadia district was as low as 8.6%, well below the state average of around 20%.

=== Agriculture ===
Persons engaged in agriculture
in Ranaghat II CD Block
1. Bargadars (3.30%)
2. Patta holders (8.61%)
3. Small farmers (7.00%)
4. Marginal farmers (35.5%)
5. Agricultural labourers (45.5%)

Although the Bargadari Act of 1950 recognised the rights of bargadars to a higher share of crops from the land that they tilled, it was not implemented fully. Large tracts, beyond the prescribed limit of land ceiling, remained with the rich landlords. From 1977 onwards major land reforms took place in West Bengal. Land in excess of land ceiling was acquired and distributed amongst the peasants. Following land reforms land ownership pattern has undergone transformation. In 2013–14, persons engaged in agriculture in Ranaghat II CD Block could be classified as follows: bargadars 3.30%, patta (document) holders 8.61%, small farmers (possessing land between 1 and 2 hectares) 7.00%, marginal farmers (possessing land up to 1 hectare) 35.55% and agricultural labourers 45.54%. As the proportion of agricultural labourers is very high, the real wage in the agricultural sector has been a matter of concern.

Ranaghat II CD Block had 196 fertiliser depots, 12 seed stores and 70 fair price shops in 2013–14.

In 2013–14, Ranaghat II CD Block produced 763 tonnes of Aman paddy, the main winter crop from 342 hectares, 27,145 tonnes of Boro paddy (spring crop) from 7,056 hectares, 9,945 tonnes of Aus paddy (summer crop) from 4,235 hectares, 5,052 tonnes of wheat from 1,388 hectares, 99,896 tonnes of jute from 5,438 hectares and 1,078 tonnes of potatoes from 44 hectares. It also produced pulses and oilseeds.

In 2013–14, the total area irrigated in Ranaghat II CD Block was 1,874 hectares, out of which 332 hectares were irrigated by river lift irrigation, 1,474 hectares by deep tube wells and 68 hectares by shallow tube wells.

=== Banking ===
In 2013–14, Ranaghat II CD Block had offices of 9 commercial banks and 5 gramin banks.

== Transport ==
Ranaghat II CD Block has 6 originating/ terminating bus services.

SH 11, running from Mahammad Bazar (in Birbhum district) to Ranaghat (in Nadia district) and SH 3, running from Krishnanagar (in Nadia district) to Gosaba (in South 24 Parganas district) pass through this CD Block.

The Ranaghat-Bangaon line passes through this block. There is a station at Gangnapur.

== Education ==
In 2013–14, Ranaghat II CD Block had 187 primary schools with 15,026 students, 13 middle schools with 1,473 students, 9 high schools with 3,492 students and 28 higher secondary schools with 37,580 students. Ranaghat II CD Block had 1 general college with 58 students and 608 institutions for special and non-formal education with 16,426 students

In Ranaghat II CD Block, amongst the 108 inhabited villages, 6 villages did not have any school, 63 had more than 1 primary school, 44 had at least 1 primary and one middle school and 31 had 1 middle school and 1 secondary school.

Pritilata Waddedar Mahavidyalaya was established at Panikhali in 2007. It was founded as a women's college but later became co-educational. It is a government-aided general degree college.

== Healthcare ==
In 2014, Ranaghat II CD Block had 1 block primary health centre, 4 primary health centres and 1 private nursing home with total 55 beds and 9 doctors (excluding private bodies). It had 31 family welfare subcentres. 3,238 patients were treated indoor and 303,533 patients were treated outdoor in the hospitals, health centres and subcentres of the CD Block.

Aranghata Rural Hospital, with 30 beds at Aranghata, is the major government medical facility in the Ranaghat II CD block. There are primary health centres at Duttapulia (with 10 beds), Gangnapur (with 4 beds), Kamalpur (with 4 beds) and Gangsara (with 4 beds).

Ranaghat II CD Block is one of the areas of Nadia district where ground water is affected by high level of arsenic contamination. The WHO guideline for arsenic in drinking water is 10 mg/ litre, and the Indian Standard value is 50 mg/ litre. All the 17 blocks of Nadia district have arsenic contamination above this level. The maximum concentration in Ranaghat II CD Block is 510 mg/litre.
