= Bagula railway station =

Railway station in West Bengal, India

Bagula
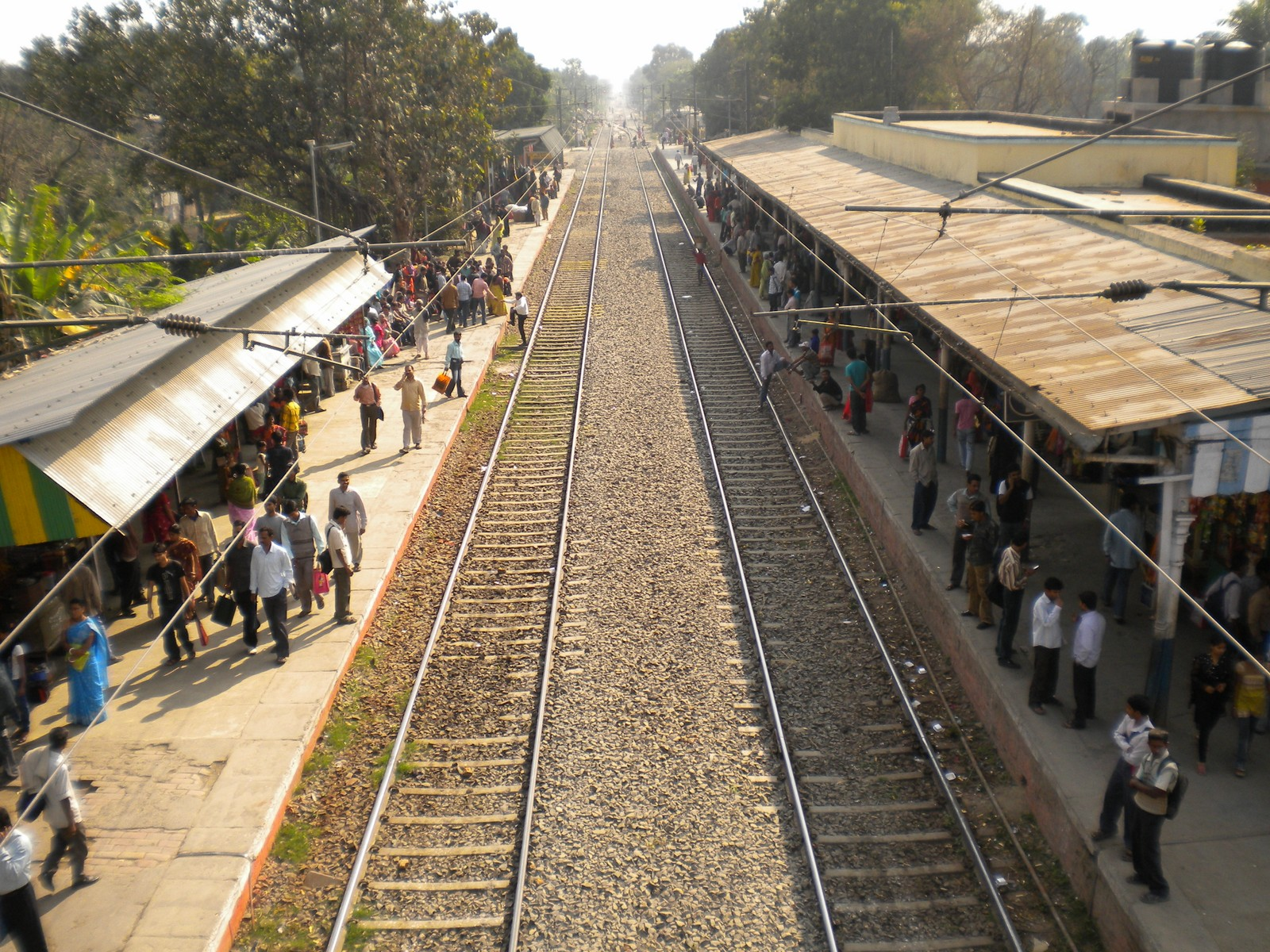
- Bagula railway station platforms

General information
- Location: Station Road, Bagula, Nadia, West Bengal; India
- Coordinates: 23°20′05″N 88°38′45″E
- Elevation: 15 m (49 ft)
- System: Kolkata Suburban Railway
- Owner: Indian Railways
- Operator: Eastern Railway
- Line: Ranaghat–Gede line of Kolkata Suburban Railway
- Platforms: 2
- Tracks: 2

Construction
- Structure type: Standard (on ground station)
- Parking: platform side paying garage no parking facility from railway
- Cycle facilities: Not available

Other information
- Status: Functioning
- Station code: BGL
- Zone(s): Eastern Railway
- Division(s): Sealdah

History
- Opened: 1862
- Electrified: 1997–98
- Former names: Eastern Bengal Railway

Passengers
- unlimited

Services
Preceding station	Kolkata Suburban Railway	Following station
Bhayna towards Sealdah	Eastern Line Gede line	Mayurhat towards Gede
Route map
Location
- Location within West Bengal Location within India

Bagula railway station is a railway station on the Ranaghat–Gede line of the Kolkata Suburban Railway system and operated by Eastern Railway. It is situated at Bagula of Nadia district in the Indian state of West Bengal. Total 48 local trains pass through the Bagula railway station and the distance from Sealdah to this railway station is approximately 93 km.

== History ==
The Ranaghat–Gede section was the part of the Eastern Bengal Railway which was opened in 1862 and extended to Kushtia, now in Bangladesh. This was the Calcutta–Siliguri Main Line but after Partition of India in 1947, this got truncated and what remained in India, was named the Gede branch line. The line including Bagula railway station was electrified in 1997–98.
