= Panikhali =

- Village
- Location in West Bengal, India Panikhali (India)
- Coordinates: 23.23168°N 88.660833°E
- Country: India
- State: West Bengal
- District: Nadia

Languages
  - Official: Bengali, English
- Time zone: UTC+5:30 (IST)
- PIN: 741501 (Aranghata)
- Telephone/STD code: 03454
- Lok Sabha constituency: Ranaghat
- Vidhan Sabha constituency: Ranaghat Uttar Purba
- Website: nadia.gov.in

Panikhali is a village in the Ranaghat II CD block in the Ranaghat subdivision of the Nadia district in the state of West Bengal, India.

== Geography ==
Cities and towns in Ranaghat subdivision of Nadia district
M: municipal town/ city/notified area, CT: census town, R: rural/ urban centre.
Owing to space constraints in the small map, the actual locations in a larger map may vary slightly

=== Location ===
Panikhali is located at 23.23168°N 88.660833°E.

=== Area overview ===
Nadia district is mostly alluvial plains lying to the east of Hooghly River, locally known as Bhagirathi. The alluvial plains are cut across by such distributaries as Jalangi, Churni and Ichhamati. With these rivers getting silted up, floods are a recurring feature. The Ranaghat subdivision has the Bhagirathi on the west, with Purba Bardhaman and Hooghly districts lying across the river. Topographically, Ranaghat subdivision is spread across the Krishnanagar-Santipur Plain, which occupies the central part of the district, and the Ranaghat-Chakdaha Plain, the low-lying area found in the south-eastern part of the district. The Churni separates the two plains. A portion of the east forms the boundary with Bangladesh. The lower portion of the east is covered by a portion of the North 24 Parganas district. The subdivision has achieved reasonably high urbanisation. 41.68% of the population lives in urban areas and 58.32% lives in rural areas.

== Transport ==
Panikhali village is situated on the Aranghata-Panikhali-Duttapulia Road.

== Education ==
Pritilata Waddedar Mahavidyalaya was established at Panikhali in 2007. It was founded as a women's college but later became co-educational. It is a government aided general degree college. The name commemorates the legacy of freedom fighter and revolutionary Pritilata Waddedar. It offers honours courses in Bengali, English, history and education.

== Healthcare ==
Aranghata Rural Hospital, with 30 beds at Aranghata, is the major government medical facility in the Ranaghat II CD block.
