= Ashim Biswas (politician) =

Indian politician

Member of the West Bengal Legislative Assembly
- In office 2 May 2021 – Incumbent
- Preceded by: Samir Kumar Poddar
- Constituency: Ranaghat Uttar Purba

Personal details
- Party: Bharatiya Janata Party
- Education: Bachelor of Arts, Honours in Political Science
- Alma mater: University of Calcutta
- Profession: Business

Ashim Biswas (born 1977) is an Indian politician from West Bengal. He is a two time member of the West Bengal Legislative Assembly from the Ranaghat Uttar Purba Assembly constituency which is reserved for Scheduled Caste community in Nadia district, representing the Bharatiya Janata Party.

== Early life and education ==
Biswas is from Ranaghat, Nadia district. He is the son of the late Rebati Ranjan Biswas. He completed his Bachelor of Arts (honours) in political science in 1995 at a college affiliated with the University of Calcutta. He runs his own business.

== Career ==
He was first elected winning the 2021 West Bengal Legislative Assembly election from Ranaghat Uttar Purba (constituency). He defeated Samir Kumar Poddar of All India Trinamool Congress by 15,515 votes. He retained the seat winning from the same seat in the 2026 West Bengal Legislative Assembly election representing the BJP. In 2026, he polled 1,26,235 votes and defeated his nearest rival Barnali Dey Roy of the Trinamool Congress by a margin of 51,743 votes.
