= Bagula =

Census Town in West Bengal, India

- Town
- Nickname: বগুলা
- Location in West Bengal, India Bagula (India)
- Coordinates: 23°20′06″N 88°38′38″E
- Country: India
- State: West Bengal
- District: Nadia

Area
  - Total: 5.6032 km^{2} (2.1634 sq mi)
- Elevation: 6 m (20 ft)

Population (2011)
  - Total: 22,649
  - Density: 4,042.2/km^{2} (10,469/sq mi)

Languages
  - Official: Bengali, English
- Time zone: UTC+5:30 (IST)
- PIN: 741502
- Telephone code: 03473
- Vehicle registration: WB
- Sex ratio: 1.06 ♂/♀

Bagula is a town in the Hanskhali CD block in the Ranaghat subdivision of the Nadia district in the state of West Bengal, India. And the founder of bagula is sumit and dipu

== Geography ==
Cities and towns in Ranaghat subdivision of Nadia district
M: municipal town/ city/notified area, CT: census town, R: rural/ urban centre.
Owing to space constraints in the small map, the actual locations in a larger map may vary slightly

=== Location ===
Bagula is located at 23.335°N 88.644°E. It has an average elevation of 6 metres (20 feet).

Bagula is known for Akanno (51) Pith Kali Pujar Mela, which is held in a famous cremation area situated beside the railway station. There are 4 high schools (e.g.Bagula High School, Bagula Purbapara High school, HCSCSK balika vidyapith also known as Bagula Girls' School, Bowanipur High school) and one college (Srikrishna College). This town also has a post office (Bagula Post Office) and a cultural hall (Guruchand Bhavan). The people of surrounding areas (e.g. Purbapara, Collegepara, Madhyapara, Sahapur, Asharpara, Ashrampara, Durgapur, Harindanga, Haritala, Kaikhali, Panditpur, Bara Chupria, Garapota, Bhawanipur, Kuthi Para, Gour Nagar, Mura Gacha, and Haldi para) are connected with Bagula for their daily needs, transport and banking.

=== Area overview ===
Nadia district is mostly alluvial plains lying to the east of Hooghly River, locally known as Bhagirathi. The alluvial plains are cut across by such distributaries as Jalangi, Churni and Ichhamati. With these rivers getting silted up, floods are a recurring feature. The Ranaghat subdivision has the Bhagirathi on the west, with Purba Bardhaman and Hooghly districts lying across the river. Topographically, Ranaghat subdivision is spread across the Krishnanagar-Santipur Plain, which occupies the central part of the district, and the Ranaghat-Chakdaha Plain, the low-lying area found in the south-eastern part of the district. The Churni separates the two plains. A portion of the east forms the boundary with Bangladesh. The lower portion of the east is covered by a portion of the North 24 Parganas district. The subdivision has achieved reasonably high urbanisation. 41.68% of the population lives in urban areas and 58.32% lives in rural areas.

Note: The map alongside presents some of the notable locations in the subdivision. All places marked in the map are linked in the larger full screen map. All the four subdivisions are presented with maps on the same scale – the size of the maps varies as per the area of the subdivision.

== Demographics ==
As per the 2011 Census of India, Bagula had a total population of 22,649, of which 11,631 (51%) were males and 11,018 (49%) were females. Population below 6 years was 1,972. The total number of literates in Bagula was 18,299 (88.50% of the population over 6 years). The Bagula Sub-Post Office (SO) serves as the main delivery hub for vast surrounding places. Local regional estimates place the overall population residing within the entire 741502 postal delivery circle at approximately 1,10,000 people.

== Civic administration ==
=== CD block HQ ===
The headquarters of block development office of Bagula is situated at Hanskhali.

== Infrastructure ==
According to the District Census Handbook 2011, Nadia, Bagula covered an area of 3.6032 km^{2}. Among the civic amenities, the protected water supply involved tap water from untreated sources, tube well, borewell. It had 2,702 domestic electric connections. Among the medical facilities it had 1 dispensary/ health centre, 10 medicine shops. Among the educational facilities it had were 18 primary schools, 3 secondary schools, 2 senior secondary schools. It had 2 recognised short-hand, typewriting and vocational training institutions. It had the branch offices of 7 nationalised banks, 1 cooperative bank, 1 agricultural credit society.

== Education ==
In between Bagula panchyat (I and II) there is a college, 8 high schools and 12 primary schools (up to class five) and in between these school all high school and 8 primary school are government sponsored. Srikrishna College is situated at Bagula. Other schools are Bagula Higher Secondary School, Bagula Purbapara Higher Secondary School, H.C.S.C. Srikrishna Balika Bidyapith. Ramnagar High School(H.S), Bhawanipur High School, Haritala Tarakdas Vidyapith (H.S.), Muragachha High School, Ulasi J.S.Vidyapith, Patikabari High School, Hanskhali Samabay Vidyapith (H.S.) Sagar Laura., Haldipara High School, Bhyana jashodamoni High School, Taraknagar Jamuna Sundari High School, Garapota High School, Gazna High School, etc. There are many primary schools. There is another school Dakshinpara RadhaSundari Pal Choudhury Vidyapith.

== Transport ==
Bagula had been an important meeting point for the cargo and human transport during the British era especially from the advent of rail connectivity (CE.1862). It was an important point of transportation towards Krishnanagar, the district headquarter until Krishnanagar received railway connectivity.

The name of the station is immortalized by the Bengali Bard Rabindranath Thakur in his famous novel 'Noukadubi'. Bagula is connected by road and railways. The local train connects Bagula railway station with Kolkata via Ranaghat. Although it connects to Gede at Indo Bangladesh Border through train via Maitri Express. Gede-Sealdah Route is the main route of Sealdah section. Bagula also connects Ranaghat and Krishnanagar by bus as well. The bus route to Kishnnagar is via Hanshkhali, which is known for Churni River. Now there is available road transport directly to Bagula from Ranaghat beside the train line. It takes maximum half an hour to travel to Bagula from Ranaghat by private car or motor bikes or small public transport (Trecker, Auto, Tata Magic, etc.).

== Healthcare ==
Bagula Rural Hospital, with 30 beds at Bagula, is the major government medical facility in the Hanskhali CD block.

There are two private nursing homes, "Sanjeevani" and "Shyamali" nursing home also servicing for the people of Bagula and near about locality. There is also an animal health centre in Bagula which is government sponsored.

== Bank in Bagula ==
In this town there are ten banks namely SBI, ICICI Bank, BOI, BOB, ALBK, central bank of India, central co-operative bank, UBI and Gramin Bank, Axis bank and co-operative bank. There are two sub-branches of SBI situated at Gazna and Haritala. In the year 2001 Bagula post office took first place in all of India for money transaction through "Western Union Money transfer" and Bagula SBI branch took the first place in West Bengal for their maximum business.

== Social activities and culture ==
Bagula is well known for its various social and cultural activities. Many clubs and organisations organize a variety of activities at different times throughout the whole year such as football cricket or tournaments. Those tournaments are popular in Bagula and the locality. Even players from outside of the Bengal come to take part in this tournament through the participating club. Except this many cultural programs are held in Bagula. Like "Puspo prodorshoni" (flower exhibition), Chatro Yuba Samiti's Program, etc. Famous folk singer Late Goshtho Gopal Das used to reside in Bagula at Puratan Para (Near Dhan Hata), and mesmerized person of Bengal through his melodious singing. Specially for the songs dedicated to Indira Gandhi and honored by Rajeev Gandhi.

== Politics ==
Bagula is divided into two Panchyat, Bagula I and II under Hanskhali community development block. It comes under Ranaghat North-East legislative Assembly and Ranaghat Loksabha. Bagula is also known for its history for "Indigo Revolution" in 1858. Bagula Kuthi Para was a center where Neel Kuthi of British people were there.

== Gallery ==
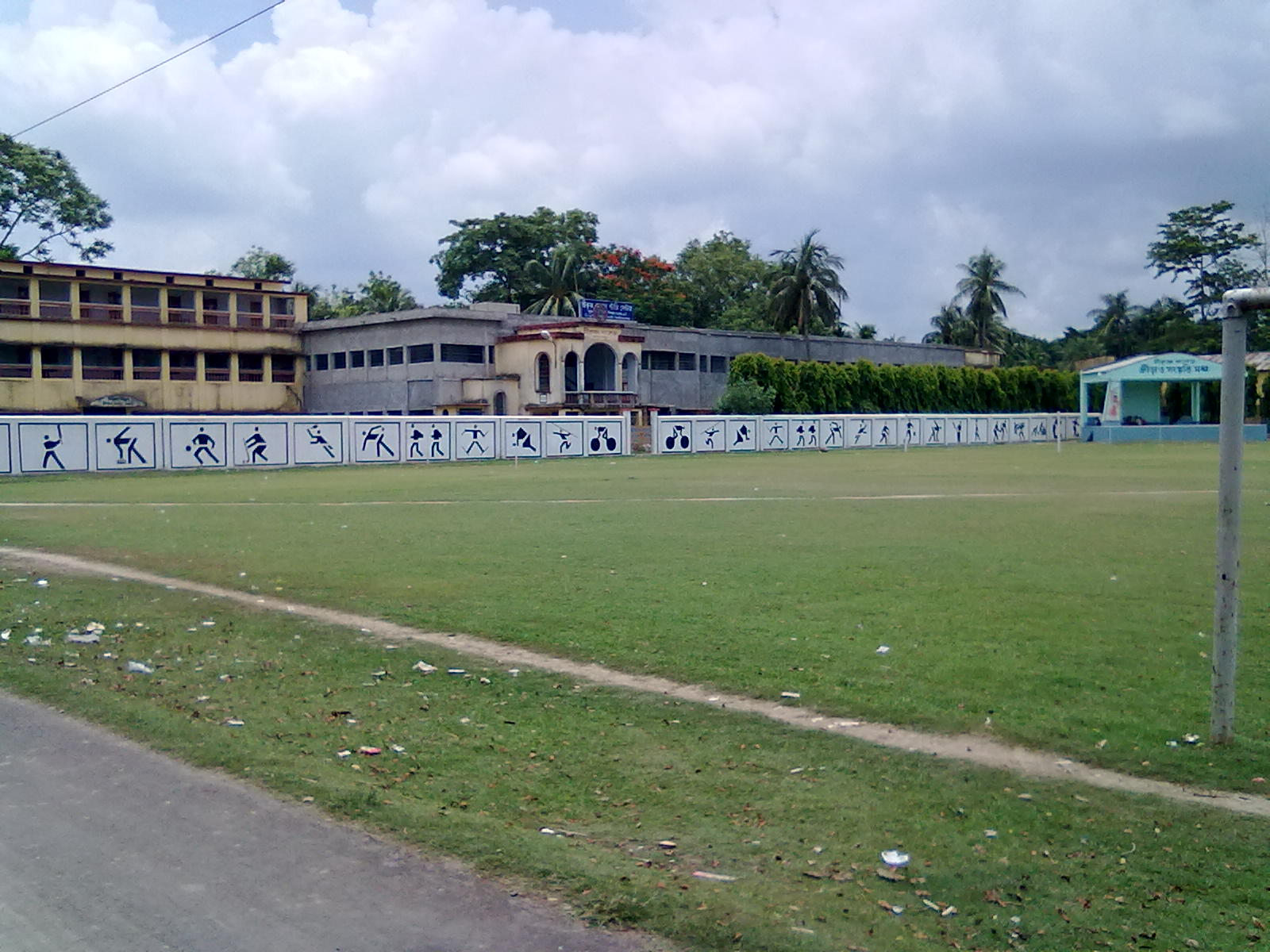
Bagula Shri Krishna College

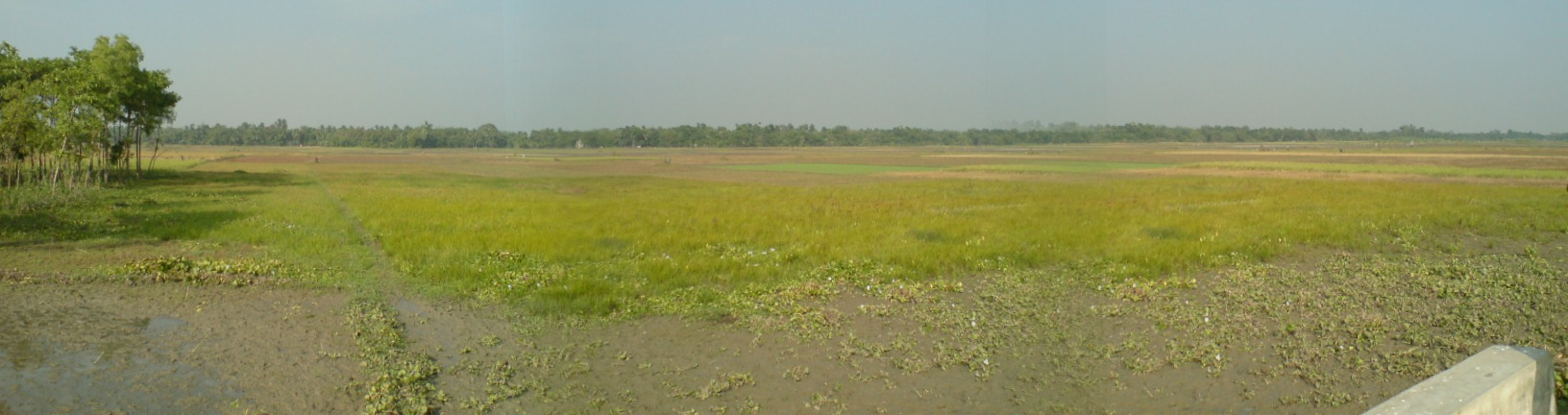
Panoramic view of crop field

Bagula Railway Station

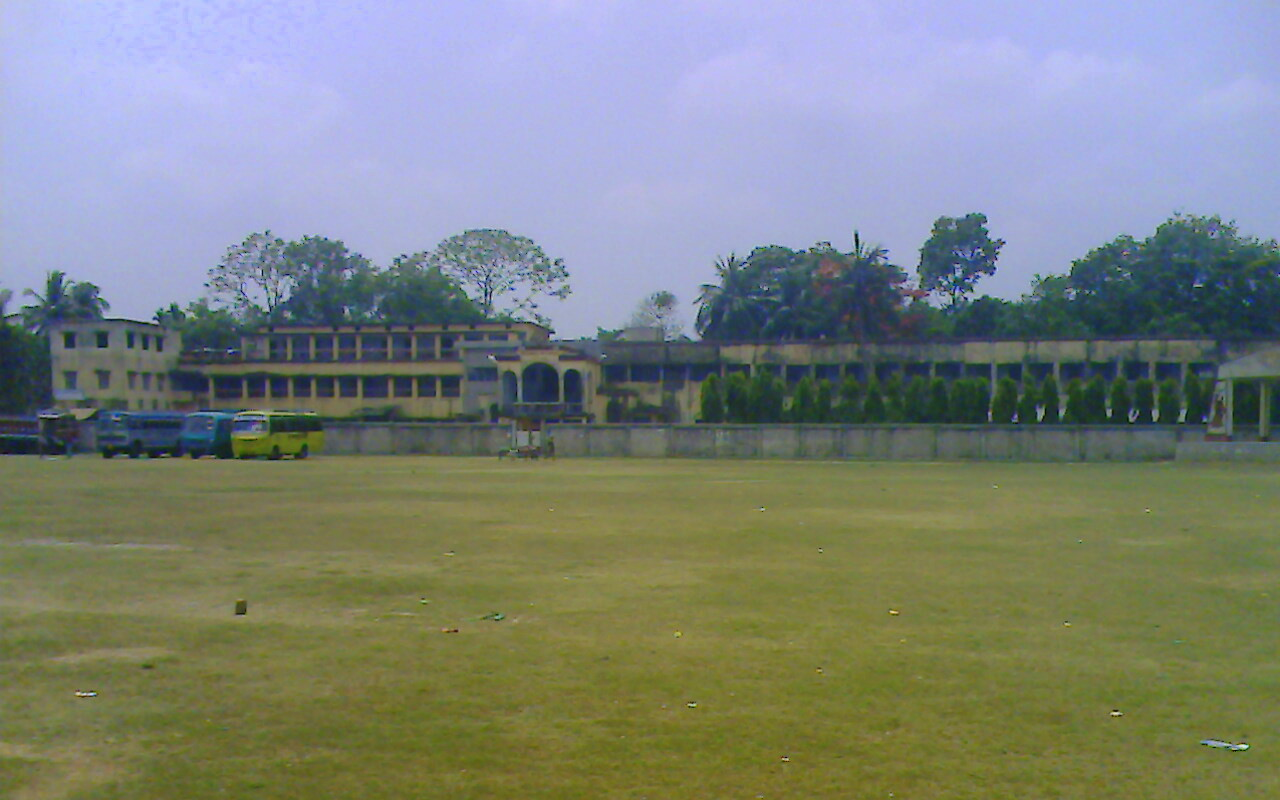
Bagula Shri Krishna College

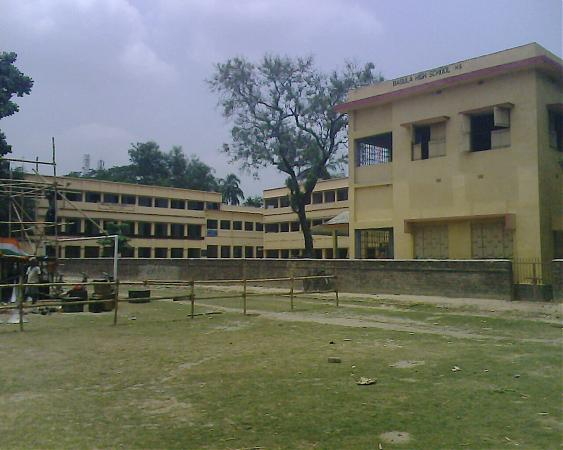
Bagula High School

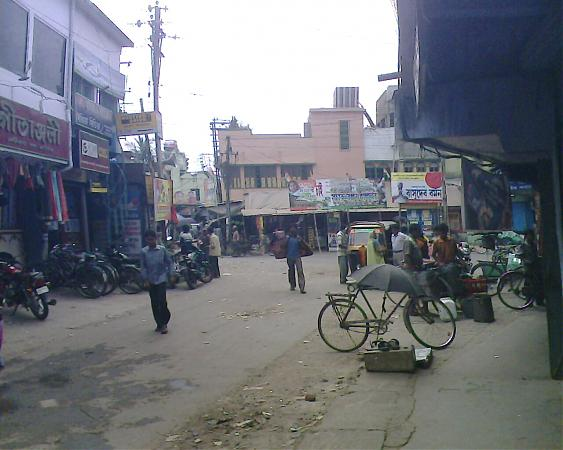
Bus stand

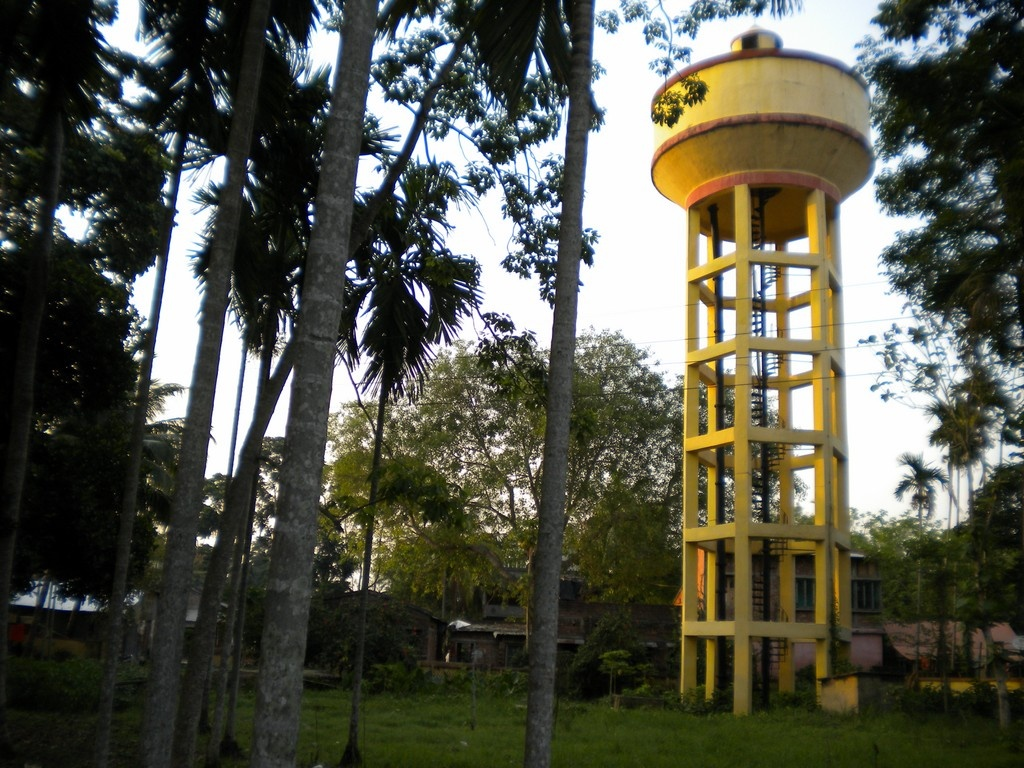
Naldurgi overhead tank
