= Hanshkhali =

Hanskhali
- Village
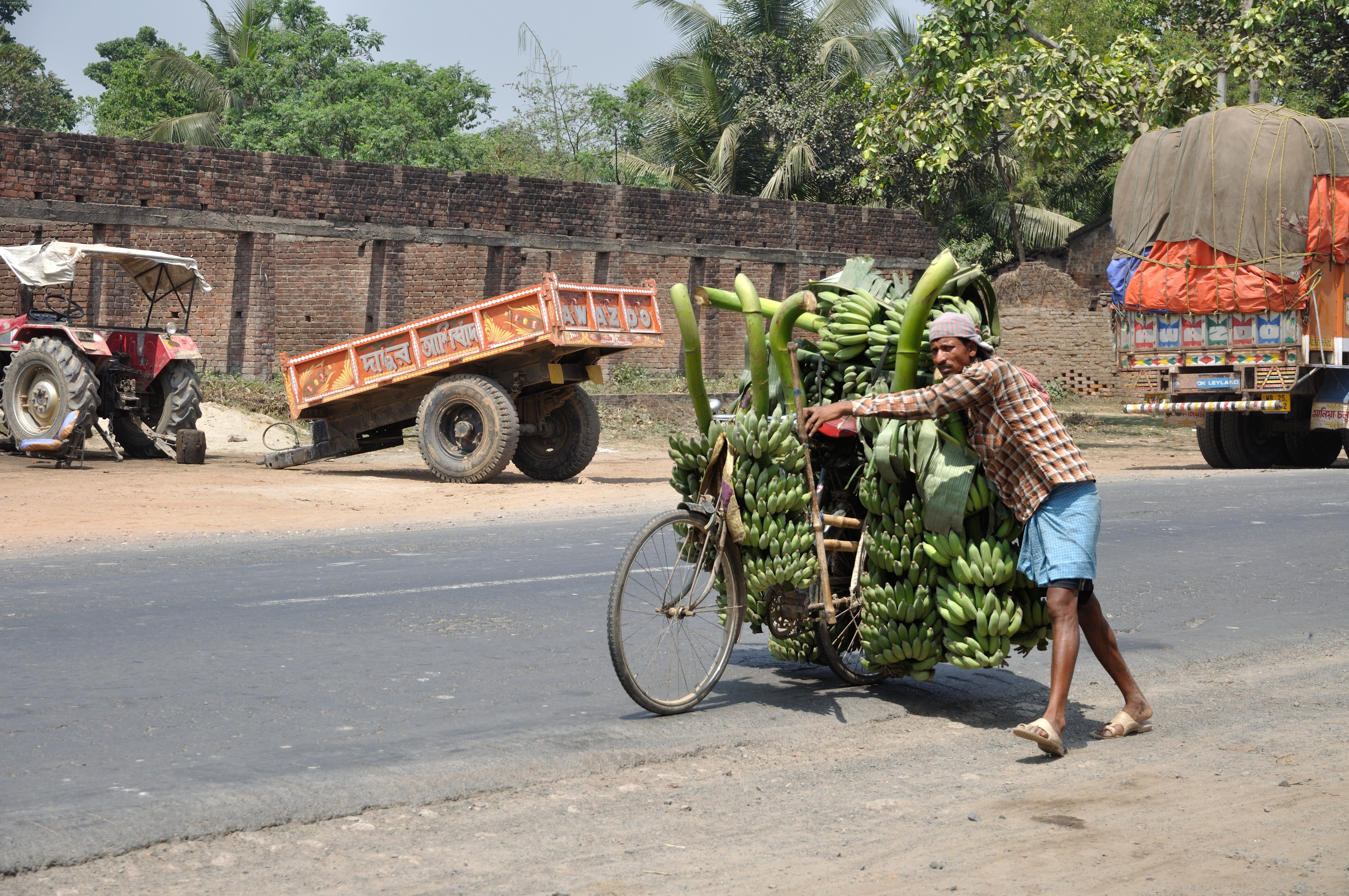
- Market-bound

- Location in West Bengal, India Hanskhali (India)
- Coordinates: 23.367747°N 88.601146°E
- Country: India
- State: West Bengal
- District: Nadia

Population (2011)
  - Total: 5,066 (according to census data)

Languages
  - Official: Bengali, English
- Time zone: UTC+5:30 (IST)
- PIN: 741505 (Hanskhali)
- Telephone/STD code: 03472
- Lok Sabha constituency: Ranaghat
- Vidhan Sabha constituency: Ranaghat Uttar Purba
- Website: nadia.gov.in

Hanskhali is a village in the Hanskhali CD block in the Ranaghat subdivision of the Nadia district in the state of West Bengal, India. Situated on the bank of the Churni River, Hanshkhali is known for an Administrative Registry Office and Police Station.

== Geography ==
Cities and towns in Ranaghat subdivision of Nadia district
M: municipal town/ city/notified area, CT: census town, R: rural/ urban centre.
Owing to space constraints in the small map, the actual locations in a larger map may vary slightly

=== Location ===
Hanskhali is located at 23.367747°N 88.601146°E.

=== Area overview ===
Nadia district is mostly alluvial plains lying to the east of Hooghly River, locally known as Bhagirathi. The alluvial plains are cut across by such distributaries as Jalangi, Churni and Ichhamati. With these rivers getting silted up, floods are a recurring feature. The Ranaghat subdivision has the Bhagirathi on the west, with Purba Bardhaman and Hooghly districts lying across the river. Topographically, Ranaghat subdivision is spread across the Krishnanagar-Santipur Plain, which occupies the central part of the district, and the Ranaghat-Chakdaha Plain, the low-lying area found in the south-eastern part of the district. The Churni separates the two plains. A portion of the east forms the boundary with Bangladesh. The lower portion of the east is covered by a portion of the North 24 Parganas district. The subdivision has achieved reasonably high urbanisation. 41.68% of the population lives in urban areas and 58.32% lives in rural areas.

Note: The map alongside presents some of the notable locations in the subdivision. All places marked in the map are linked in the larger full screen map. All the four subdivisions are presented with maps on the same scale – the size of the maps vary as per the area of the subdivision.

== Demographics ==
According to the 2011 Census of India, Hanskhali had a total population of 19,466, of which 10,045 (52%) were males and 9,421 (48%) were females. Population in the age range 0–6 years was 4,515. The total number of literate persons in Hanskhali was 17,912 (85.96% of the population over 6 years).

== Civic administration ==
=== Police station ===
Hanskhali police station has jurisdiction over Hanskhali CD block. The total area covered by the police station is 229 km^{2} and the population covered is 210,916 (2001 census). 25 km of Bangladesh-India border is part of the PS area.

== Transport ==
State Highway 3, running from Krishnanagar (in Nadia district) to Gosaba (in South 24 Parganas district) passes through Hanskhali.

== Education ==
=== High schools ===
- Hanskhali High School (HS)
- Hanskhali Samabay Vidyapith (HS)

=== College ===
- Srikrishna College, established at Bagula in 1952. Affiliated to the University of Kalyani.
