= Ranaghat Uttar Purba Assembly constituency =

Ranaghat Uttar Purba
- Constituency No. 89 for the West Bengal Legislative Assembly
- Interactive Map Outlining Ranaghat Uttar Purba Assembly Constituency

Constituency details
- Country: India
- Region: East India
- State: West Bengal
- District: Nadia
- Lok Sabha constituency: Ranaghat
- Established: 2011
- Total electors: 238,113
- Reservation: SC

Member of Legislative Assembly
- 18th West Bengal Legislative Assembly
- Incumbent Ashim Biswas
- Party: BJP
- Alliance: NDA
- Elected year: 2026

Ranaghat Uttar Purba Assembly constituency is an assembly constituency in Nadia district in the Indian state of West Bengal. It is reserved for scheduled castes.

== Overview ==
As per orders of the Delimitation Commission, No. 89 Ranaghat Uttar Purba Assembly constituency (SC) is composed of the following: Aranghata, Bahirgachhi, Duttapulia, Jugalkishore, Kamalpur and Raghunathpur Hijuli II gram panchayats of Ranaghat II community development block, and Bagula I, Bagula II, Mamjoan, Ramnagar Bara Chupria I and Ramnagar Bara Chupria II gram panchayats of Hanskhali community development block.

Ranaghat Uttar Purba Assembly constituency (SC) is part of No. 13 Ranaghat (Lok Sabha constituency) (SC). Ranaghat East and West were earlier part of Nabadwip (Lok Sabha constituency).

== Members of the Legislative Assembly ==
=== Ranaghat ===
Year	Name	Party
1951	Bijoy Krishna Sarkar	Indian National Congress
1951	Keshab Chandra Mitra	Indian National Congress
1957	Benoy Kumar Chatterjee	Indian National Congress
1962	Gour Chandra Kundu	Communist Party of India

=== Ranaghat East ===
Year	Name	Party
1967	Nitai Pada Sarkar	Communist Party of India
1969	Nitai Pada Sarkar	Communist Party of India
1971	Naresh Chandra Biswas	Communist Party of India
1972	Nitaipada Sarkar	Communist Party of India
1977	Satish Chandra Biswas	Communist Party of India
1982	Satish Chandra Biswas	Communist Party of India
1987	Binay Krishna Biswas	Communist Party of India
1991	Binay Krishna Biswas	Communist Party of India
1996	Binay Krishna Biswas	Communist Party of India
2001	Asim Bala	Communist Party of India
2006	Debendra Nath Biswas	Communist Party of India

=== Ranaghat West ===
Year	Name	Party
1967	Benoy Kumar Chatterjee	Indian National Congress
1969	Gour Chandra Kundu	Communist Party of India
1971	Gour Chandra Kundu	Communist Party of India
1972	Naresh Chandra Chaki	Indian National Congress
1977	Gour Chandra Kundu	Communist Party of India
1982	Gour Chandra Kundu	Communist Party of India
1987	Gour Chandra Kundu	Communist Party of India
1991	Subhaas Basu	Communist Party of India
1996	Shankar Singha	Indian National Congress
2001	Shankar Singha	Indian National Congress
2006	Aloke Kumar Das	Communist Party of India

=== Ranaghat Uttar Purba ===
Year	Name	Party
2011	Samir Kumar Poddar	All India Trinamool Congress
2016	Samir Kumar Poddar	All India Trinamool Congress
2021	Ashim Biswas	Bharatiya Janata Party
2026	Ashim Biswas	Bharatiya Janata Party

== Election results ==
=== 2026 ===
2026 West Bengal Legislative Assembly election: Ranaghat Uttar Purba
Party	Candidate	Votes	%	±%
BJP	Ashim Biswas	126,235	59.71	▲5.32
AITC	Barnali Dey Roy	74,492	35.24	▼4.35
CPI(M)	Mrinal Biswas	4,713	2.23	
NOTA	None of the above	1,779	0.84	▼0.26
Majority		51,743	24.47	▲9.67
Turnout		211,396	90.51	▲9.46
BJP hold		Swing		

=== 2021 ===
2021 West Bengal Legislative Assembly election: Ranaghat Uttar Purba
Party	Candidate	Votes	%	±%
BJP	Ashim Biswas	116,786	54.39	
AITC	Samir Kumar Poddar	85,004	39.59	
ISF	Dinesh Chandra Biswas	5,204	2.42	
BSP	Sanjit Kumar Mandal	2,117	0.99	
NOTA	None of the above	2,359	1.1	
Majority		31,782	14.8	
Turnout		214,736	81.05	
BJP gain from AITC		Swing		

=== 2016 ===
In the 2016 election, Samir Poddar of Trinamool Congress defeated his nearest rival, Babusona Sarkar of CPI(M).

West Bengal assembly elections, 2016: Ranaghat Uttar Purba (SC) constituency
Party	Candidate	Votes	%	±%
AITC	Samir Kumar Poddar	93,215	48.13	−6.90
CPI(M)	Babusona Sarkar	78,243	40.40	+3.66
BJP	Nikhil Ranjan Sarkar	15,467	7.99	+4.33
BSP	Pradip Kumar Sarkar	2,301	1.19	−1.49
NOTA	None of the above	1,642	0.85	+0.85
Turnout		1,93,678	81.10	−3.84
AITC hold		Swing		

=== 2011 ===
In the 2011 election, Samir Poddar of Trinamool Congress defeated his nearest rival Archana Biswas of CPI(M).

West Bengal assembly elections, 2011: Ranaghat Uttar Purba (SC) constituency
Party	Candidate	Votes	%	±%
AITC	Samir Kumar Poddar	93,836	55.03	+11.72
CPI(M)	Archana Biswas	62,644	36.74	−11.12
BJP	Basudev Majumdar	6,243	3.66	
BSP	Nanigopal Roy	4,578	2.68	
Independent	Subhas Chandra Sarkar	1,967		
Nirjatita Samaj Biplabi Party	Anuva Sikder (Mallick)	1,237		
Turnout		170,505	84.94	
AITC gain from CPI(M)		Swing	+22.84	

.# Swing calculated on Congress+Trinamool Congress vote percentages taken together, as well as the CPI(M) vote percentage, in 2006 for the now defunct Hanskhali seat.

=== 1962 ===
In 1962 and 1957, there was a single seat for Ranaghat. Gour Chandra Kundu of CPI won in 1962. Benoy Kumar Chatterjee of Congress won in 1957. In independent India's first election in 1951, Ranaghat was a joint seat. Bijoy Krishna Sarkar and Keshab Chandra Mitra won the Ranaghat seat.

=== 1972 ===
==== Ranaghat East ====
Nitaipada Sarkar of CPI won in 1972. Naresh Chandra Biswas of CPI(M) won in 1971. Nitai Pada Sarkar of CPI won in 1969 and 1967.

==== Ranaghat West ====
Naresh Chandra Chaki of Congress won in 1972. Gour Chandra Kundu of CPI(M) 1971 and 1969. Benoy Kumar Chatterjee of Congress won in 1967.
