= Habibpur, Nadia =

Habibpur
- Village
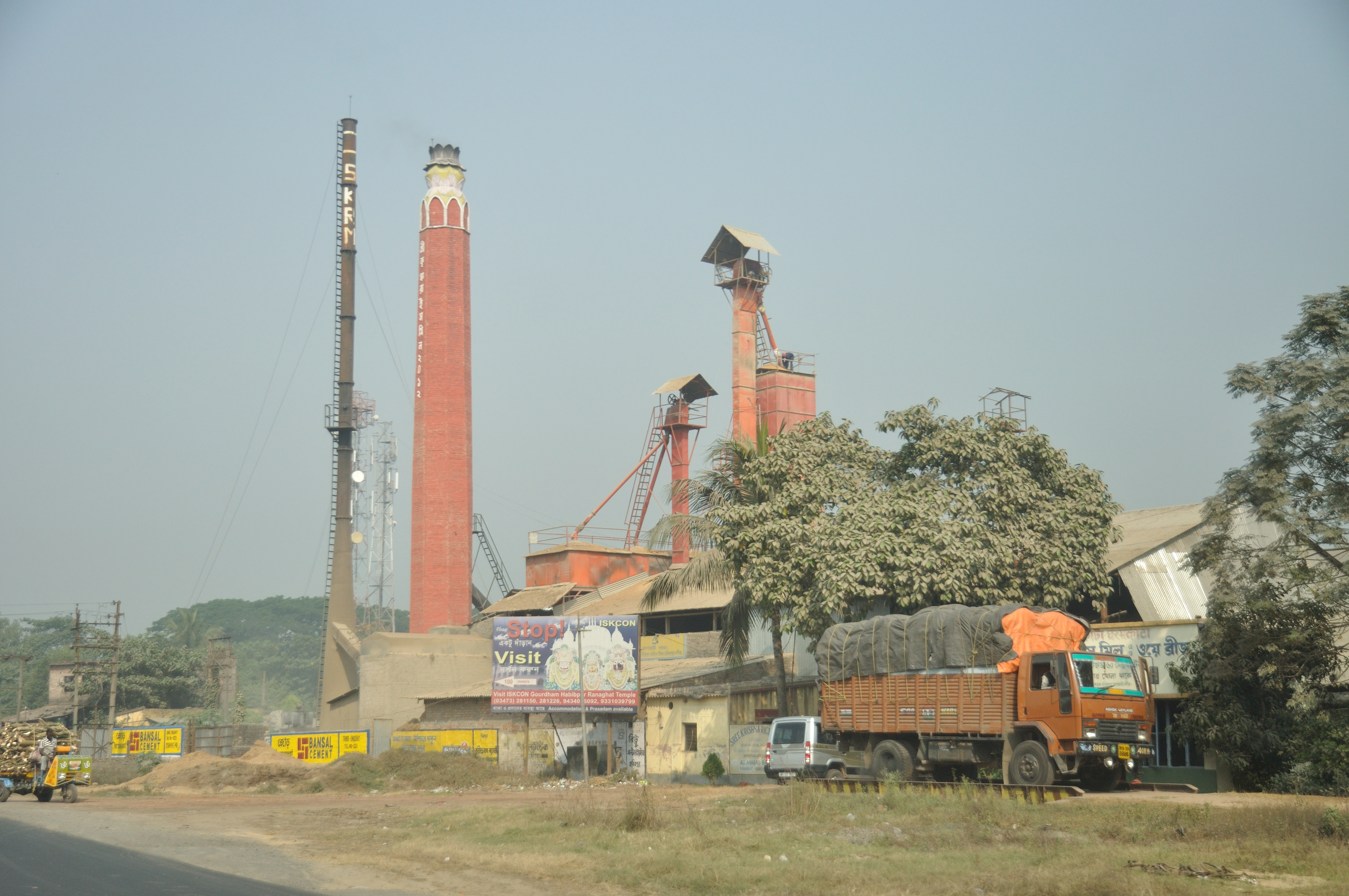
- A rice mill

- Location in West Bengal, India Habibpur (India)
- Coordinates: 23.176376°N 88.516123°E
- Country: India
- State: West Bengal
- District: Nadia

Population
  - Total: 13,383

Languages
  - Official: Bengali, English
- Time zone: UTC+5:30 (IST)
- Postal code: 741402
- Telephone code: 03473
- Vehicle registration: WB-
- Nearest city: Ranaghat
- Administration: BDO-Officer
- Climate: Tropical monsoon (Köppen)
- Avg. summer temperature: 35 °C (95 °F)
- Avg. winter temperature: 20 °C (68 °F)

Habibpur is a village in the Ranaghat I CD block in the Ranaghat subdivision of the Nadia district, west Bengal, India

== Geography ==
Cities and towns in Ranaghat subdivision of Nadia district
M: municipal town/ city/notified area, CT: census town, R: rural/ urban centre.
Owing to space constraints in the small map, the actual locations in a larger map may vary slightly

=== Location ===
Habibpur is located at 23.176376°N 88.516123°E.

The maps of Ranaghat I and Ranaghat II CD blocks, in the District Census Handbook 2011, Nadia, shows the census towns of Kamgachhi, Raghabpur, Panpara, Aistala, Satigachha, Anulia, Halalpur Krishnapur, Hijuli and Ranaghat (CT) forming a cluster around Ranaghat. Certain other localities such as Nokari, Nasra, Cooper's Camp, Birnagar, Habibpur, Gopalpur and Parbbatipur are also linked with this cluster.

=== Area overview ===
Nadia district is mostly alluvial plains lying to the east of Hooghly River, locally known as Bhagirathi. The alluvial plains are cut across by such distributaries as Jalangi, Churni and Ichhamati. With these rivers getting silted up, floods are a recurring feature. The Ranaghat subdivision has the Bhagirathi on the west, with Purba Bardhaman and Hooghly districts lying across the river. Topographically, Ranaghat subdivision is spread across the Krishnanagar-Santipur Plain, which occupies the central part of the district, and the Ranaghat-Chakdaha Plain, the low-lying area found in the south-eastern part of the district. The Churni separates the two plains. A portion of the east forms the boundary with Bangladesh. The lower portion of the east is covered by a portion of the North 24 Parganas district. The subdivision has achieved reasonably high urbanisation. 41.68% of the population lives in urban areas and 58.32% lives in rural areas.

Note: The map alongside presents some of the notable locations in the subdivision. All places marked in the map are linked in the larger full screen map. All the four subdivisions are presented with maps on the same scale – the size of the maps vary as per the area of the subdivision.

== Demographics ==
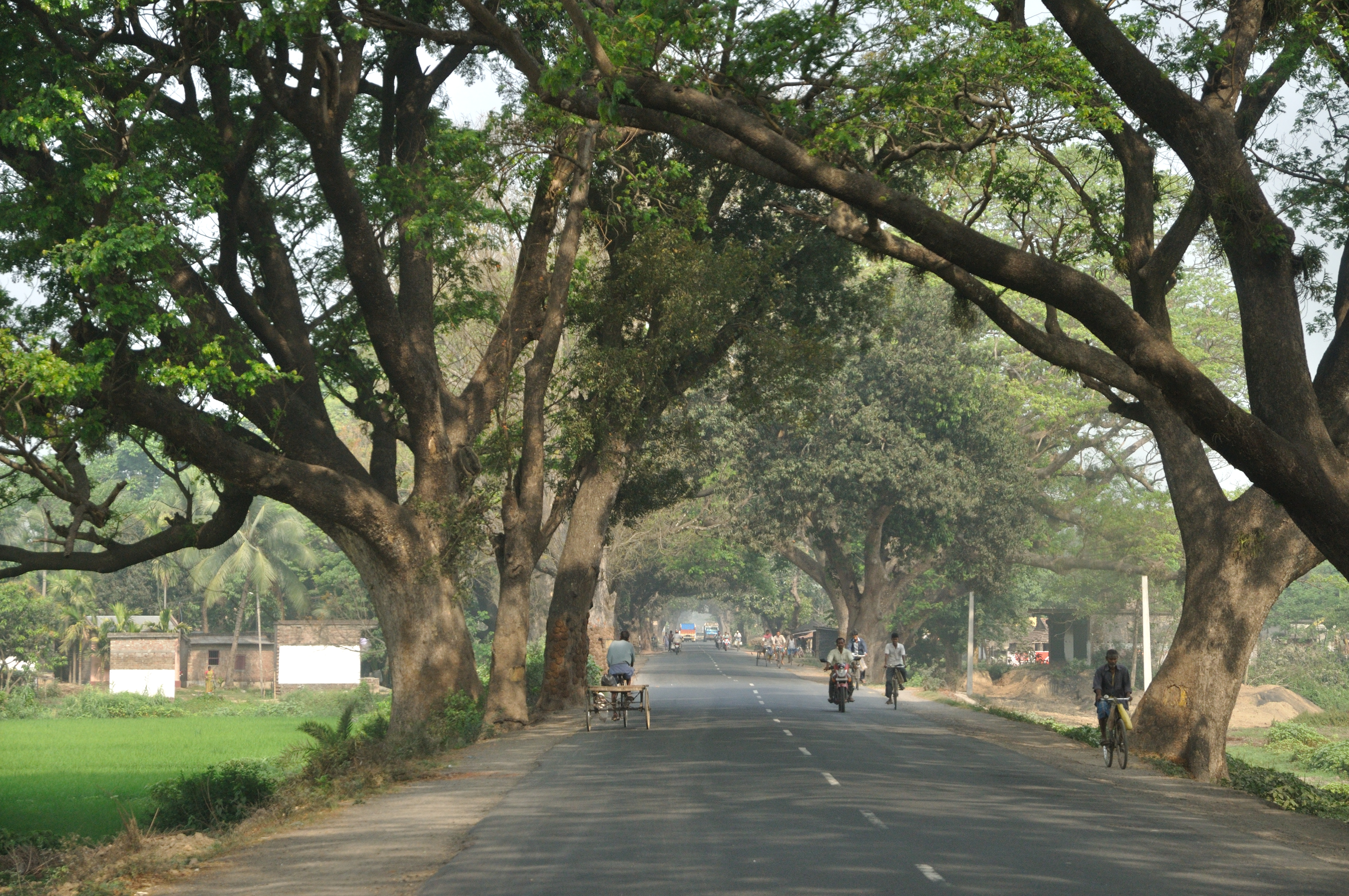
Indian National Highway 34, Habibpur, Nadia

According to the 2011 Census of India, Habibpur had a total population of 13,383, of which 6,924 (52%) were males and 6,459 (48%) were females. Population in the age range 0–6 years was 1,314. The total number of literate persons in Habibpur was 9,547 (79.10% of the population over 6 years).

== Civic administration ==
=== CD block HQ ===
Habibpur area is administered by BDO. The headquarters of Ranaghat I CD block are located at Habibpur.

== Transport ==
Habibpur railway station is situated on Ranaghat-Santipur branch line of Sealdah railway division.

== Healthcare ==
Habibpur (Jadav Dutta) Rural Hospital, with 30 beds at Habibpur, is the major government medical facility in the Ranaghat I CD block.
