= Ranaghat I =

- Community development block
- Coordinates: 23.2083762°N 88.5291195°E
- Country: India
- State: West Bengal
- District: Nadia

Government
  - Type: Community development block

Area
  - Total: 145.53 km^{2} (56.19 sq mi)
- Elevation: 16 m (52 ft)

Population (2011)
  - Total: 232,282
  - Density: 1,596.1/km^{2} (4,133.9/sq mi)

Languages
  - Official: Bengali, English

Literacy (2011)
  - Total literates: 163,429 (77.61%)
- Time zone: UTC+5:30 (IST)
- PIN: 741255 (Anulia); 741403 (Habibpur)
- Telephone/STD code: 03473
- Vehicle registration: WB-51, WB-52
- Lok Sabha constituency: Ranaghat
- Vidhan Sabha constituency: Ranaghat Dakshin, Ranaghat Uttar Paschim
- Website: www.ranaghat.gov.in/ranaghat-i-development-block.html/

Ranaghat I is a community development block that forms an administrative division in Ranaghat subdivision of Nadia district in the Indian state of West Bengal.

== Geography ==
Habibpur is located at 23°12′30″N 88°31′45″E.

Ranaghat I CD Block is bounded by Hanskhali CD Block in the north, Ranaghat II CD Block in the east, Chakdaha CD Block in the south and Santipur CD Block and Balagarh CD Block in Hooghly district across the Hooghly River in the west.

Nadia district is mostly alluvial plains lying to the east of Hooghly River, locally known as the Bhagirathi. The alluvial plains are cut across by such distributaries as the Jalangi, Churni and Ichhamati. With these rivers getting silted up, floods are a recurring feature.

Ranaghat I CD Block has an area of 145.53 km^{2}. It has 1 panchayat samity, 10 gram panchayats, 177 gram sansads (village councils), 64 mouzas and 55 inhabited villages. Ranaghat and Taherpur police stations serve this block. Headquarters of this CD Block is at Habibpur. It is located 22 km from Krishnanagar, the district headquarters.

Gram panchayats of Ranaghat I block/ panchayat samiti are: Anulia, Habibpur, Barasat, Kalinarayanpur, Paharpur, Khisma, Nawpara Masunda, Payradanga, Ramnagar I, Ramnagar II and Tarapur.

== Demographics ==
=== Population ===
As per the 2011 Census of India, Ranaghat I CD Block had a total population of 232,282, of which 120,847 were rural and 111,435 were urban. There were 119,444 (51%) males and 112,838 (49%) females. The population below six years of age was 21,717. Scheduled Castes numbered 84,911 (36.56%) and Scheduled Tribes numbered 4,438 (1.91%).

As per the 2001 census, Ranaghat I block had a total population 207,320, out of which 106,134 were males and 101,186 were females. Ranaghat I block registered a population growth of 13.28 per cent during the 1991-2001 decade. Decadal growth for the district was 19.51 per cent. Decadal growth in West Bengal was 17.84 per cent.

There are several census towns in Ranaghat I CD Block (2011 census figures in brackets) : Gangni (5,532), Kamgachhi (19,998), Raghabpur (10.280), Panpara (5,349), Aistala (20,662), Satigachha (9,847), Anulia (5,220), Gopalpur (7,818) and Parbbatipur (9,584).

Outgrowths in Ranaghat I CD Block (2011 census figures in brackets): Taherpur (Ward No. 14) (3,095), Barasat (Ward No, 15) (6,770), Bhaduri (Ward No. 16)(4,558) and Mahisdanga (Ward No. 17) (2,722).

Large villages (with 4,000+ population) in Ranaghat I CD Block (2011 census figures in brackets): Krishnapur Chak (4,493), Birnagar (P) (7,513), Habibpur (13,310), Paschim Noapara (5,030), Ukhil Nara (6,572) and Sundalpur Char (4,642).

Other villages in Ranaghat I CD Block include (2011 census figures in brackets): Khiima (2,944) and Mashunda (1,304).

=== Literacy ===
As per the 2011 census, the total number of literates in Ranaghat I CD Block was 163,429 (77.61% of the population over six years) out of which males numbered 88,861 (88.08% of the male population over six years) and females numbered 74,568 (72.89% of the female population over six years). The gender disparity (the difference between female and male literacy rates) was 9.19%.

See also – List of West Bengal districts ranked by literacy rate

Literacy in CD blocks of
Nadia district
Tehatta subdivision
Karimpur I – 67.70%
Karimpur II – 62.04%
Tehatta I – 70.72%
Tehatta II – 68.52%
Krishnanagar Sadar subdivision
Kaliganj – 65.89%
Nakashipara – 64.86%
Chapra – 68.25%
Krishnanagar I – 71.45%
Krishnanagar II – 68.52%
Nabadwip – 67.72%
Krishnaganj – 72.86%
Ranaghat subdivision
Hanskhali – 80.11%
Santipur – 73.10%
Ranaghat I – 77.61%
Ranaghat II – 79.38%
Kalyani subdivision
Chakdaha – 64.17%
Haringhata – 82.15%
Source: 2011 Census: CD Block Wise
Primary Census Abstract Data

=== Language and religion ===
Religion in Ranaghat I CD block (2011)
Hinduism	93.82%
Islam	5.67%
Other or not stated	0.51%

In the 2011 census, Hindus numbered 201,832 and formed 93.82% of the population in Ranaghat I CD Block. Muslims numbered 12,208 and formed 5.67% of the population. Christians numbered 837 and formed 0.39% of the population. Others numbered 260 and formed 0.12% of the population.

In the 2001 census, Hindus numbered 480,008 and formed 89.28% of the combined population of Ranaghat I and Ranaghat II CD Blocks. Muslims numbered 50,640 and formed 9.42% of the combined population. In the 1991 census, Hindus numbered 438,924 and formed 93.50% of the combined population of Ranaghat I and Ranaghat II CD Blocks. Muslims numbered 24,349 and formed 5.19% of the combined population.

Languages in Ranaghat I CD block (2011)
1. Bengali (98.7%)
2. Hindi (1.21%)
3. Others (0.13%)

At the time of the 2011 census, 98.66% of the population spoke Bengali and 1.21% Hindi as their first language.

== Rural poverty ==
The District Human Development Report for Nadia has provided a CD Block-wise data table for Modified Human Vulnerability Index of the district. Ranaghat I CD Block registered 34.08 on the MHPI scale. The CD Block-wise mean MHVI was estimated at 33.92. A total of 8 out of the 17 CD Blocks in Nadia district were found to be severely deprived when measured against the CD Block mean MHVI - Karimpur I and Karimpur II (under Tehatta subdivision), Kaliganj, Nakashipara, Chapra, Krishnanagar I and Nabadwip (under Krishnanagar Sadar subdivision) and Santipur (under Ranaghat subdivision) appear to be backward.

As per the Human Development Report 2004 for West Bengal, the rural poverty ratio in Nadia district was 28.35%. The estimate was based on Central Sample data of NSS 55th round 1999–2000.

== Economy ==
=== Livelihood ===
In Ranaghat I CD Block in 2011, amongst the class of total workers, cultivators formed 13.66%, agricultural labourers 20.99, household industry workers 10.34% and other workers 55.01%.

The southern part of Nadia district starting from Krishnanagar I down to Chakdaha and Haringhata has some urban pockets specialising in either manufacturing or service related economic activity and has reflected a comparatively higher concentration of population but the urban population has generally stagnated. Nadia district still has a large chunk of people living in the rural areas.

=== Infrastructure ===
There are 55 inhabited villages in Ranaghat I CD Block. 100% villages have power supply and drinking water supply. 9 Villages (16.36%) have post offices. 54 villages (98.18%) have telephones (including landlines, public call offices and mobile phones). 43 villages (78.18%) have a pucca approach road and 12 villages (21.82%) have transport communication (includes bus service, rail facility and navigable waterways). 9 villages (16.36%) have agricultural credit societies and 5 villages (9.09%) have banks. However, although 100% villages in Nadia district had power supply in 2011, a survey in 2007-08 revealed that less than 50% of households had electricity connection. In rural areas of the country, the tube well was for many years considered to be the provider of safe drinking water, but with arsenic contamination of ground water claiming public attention it is no longer so. Piped water supply is still a distant dream. In 2007–08, the availability of piped drinking water in Nadia district was as low as 8.6%, well below the state average of around 20%.

=== Agriculture ===
Persons engaged in agriculture
in Ranaghat I CD Block
1. Bargadars (4.18%)
2. Patta holders (13.6%)
3. Small farmers (5.04%)
4. Marginal farmers (37.1%)
5. Agricultural labourers (40.1%)

Although the Bargadari Act of 1950 recognised the rights of bargadars to a higher share of crops from the land that they tilled, it was not implemented fully. Large tracts, beyond the prescribed limit of land ceiling, remained with the rich landlords. From 1977 onwards major land reforms took place in West Bengal. Land in excess of land ceiling was acquired and distributed amongst the peasants. Following land reforms land ownership pattern has undergone transformation. In 2013–14, persons engaged in agriculture in Ranaghat II CD Block could be classified as follows: bargadars 3.30%, patta (document) holders 8.61%, small farmers (possessing land between 1 and 2 hectares) 7.00%, marginal farmers (possessing land up to 1 hectare) 35.55% and agricultural labourers 40.12%. As the proportion of agricultural labourers is very high, the real wage in the agricultural sector has been a matter of concern.

Ranaghat I CD Block had 189 fertiliser depots, 1 seed stores and 77 fair price shops in 2013–14.

In 2013–14, Ranaghat I CD Block produced 10,255 tonnes of Aman paddy, the main winter crop from 2,692 hectares, 12,416 tonnes of Boro paddy (spring crop) from 3,518 hectares, 11,159 tonnes of Aus paddy (summer crop) from 4,120 hectares, 252 tonnes of wheat from 93 hectares, 67,959 tonnes of jute from 3,230 hectares and 85 tonnes of potatoes from 3 hectares. It also produced pulses and oilseeds.

In 2013–14, the total area irrigated in Ranaghat I CD Block was 2,103 hectares, out of which 894 hectares were irrigated by river lift irrigation, 1,079 hectares by deep tube wells and 130 hectares by shallow tube wells.

=== Banking ===
In 2013–14, Ranaghat I CD Block had offices of 10 commercial banks and 1 gramin bank.

== Transport ==
Ranaghat I CD Block has 7 ferry service and 4 originating/ terminating bus services.

NH 12 (old number NH 34) passes through this block.

== Education ==
In 2013–14, Ranaghat I CD Block had 123 primary schools with 8,301 students, 9 middle schools with 535 students, 5 high schools with 2,106 students and 15 higher secondary schools with 20,171 students. Ranaghat I CD Block had 1 technical/ professional institution with 100 students and 435 institutions for special and non-formal education with 11,718 students

In Ranaghat I CD Block, amongst the 55 inhabited villages, 5 villages did not have any school, 24 had more than 1 primary school, 16 had at least 1 primary and 10 had 1 middle school and 1 secondary school.

== Healthcare ==
In 2014, Ranaghat I CD Block had 1 hospital, 1 block primary health cene, 3 primary health centres and 1 private nursing home with total 300 beds and 50 doctors (excluding private bodies). It had 21 family welfare subcentres. 32,559 patients were treated indoor and 373,260 patients were treated outdoor in the hospitals, health centres and subcentres of the CD Block.

Habibpur (Jadav Dutta) Rural Hospital, with 30 beds at Habibpur, is the major government medical facility in the Ranaghat I CD block. There are primary health centres at Paschim Noapara Bhabasundari (with 10 beds), Paharpur (with 6 beds) and Taherpur (with 6 beds).

Ranaghat I CD Block is one of the areas of Nadia district where ground water is affected by high level of arsenic contamination. The WHO guideline for arsenic in drinking water is 10 mg/ litre, and the Indian Standard value is 50 mg/ litre. All the 17 blocks of Nadia district have arsenic contamination above this level. The maximum concentration in Ranaghat I CD Block is 566 mg/litre.
