= Gopalpur, Nadia =

Gopalpur
- Census Town
- Location in West Bengal, India Gopalpur (India)
- Coordinates: 23.1357°N 88.5456°E
- Country: India
- State: West Bengal
- District: Nadia

Area
  - Total: 1.53 km^{2} (0.59 sq mi)
- Elevation: 7 m (23 ft)

Population (2011)
  - Total: 7,818
  - Density: 5,110/km^{2} (13,200/sq mi)

Languages
  - Official: Bengali, English
- Time zone: UTC+5:30 (IST)
- ISO 3166 code: IN-WB
- Vehicle registration: WB
- Website: wb.gov.in

Gopalpur is a census town in the Ranaghat I CD block in the Ranaghat subdivision of the Nadia district in the Indian state of West Bengal.

== Geography ==
Cities and towns in Ranaghat subdivision of Nadia district
M: municipal town/ city/notified area, CT: census town, R: rural/ urban centre.
Owing to space constraints in the small map, the actual locations in a larger map may vary slightly

=== Location ===
Gopalpur is located at 23.1357°N 88.5456°E.

The maps of Ranaghat I and Ranaghat II CD blocks, in the District Census Handbook 2011, Nadia, shows the census towns of Kamgachhi, Raghabpur, Panpara, Aistala, Satigachha, Anulia, Halalpur Krishnapur, Hijuli and Ranaghat (CT) forming a cluster around Ranaghat. Certain other localities such as Nokari, Nasra, Cooper's Camp, Birnagar, Habibpur, Gopalpur and Parbbatipur are also linked with this cluster.

Nadia district is mostly alluvial plains lying to the east of Hooghly River, locally known as Bhagirathi. The alluvial plains are cut across by such distributaries as Jalangi, Churni and Ichamati River. With these rivers getting silted up, floods are a recurring feature.

=== Area overview ===
Nadia district is mostly alluvial plains lying to the east of Hooghly River, locally known as Bhagirathi. The alluvial plains are cut across by such distributaries as Jalangi, Churni and Ichhamati. With these rivers getting silted up, floods are a recurring feature. The Ranaghat subdivision has the Bhagirathi on the west, with Purba Bardhaman and Hooghly districts lying across the river. Topographically, Ranaghat subdivision is spread across the Krishnanagar-Santipur Plain, which occupies the central part of the district, and the Ranaghat-Chakdaha Plain, the low-lying area found in the south-eastern part of the district. The Churni separates the two plains. A portion of the east forms the boundary with Bangladesh. The lower portion of the east is covered by a portion of the North 24 Parganas district. The subdivision has achieved reasonably high urbanisation. 41.68% of the population lives in urban areas and 58.32% lives in rural areas.

Note: The map alongside presents some of the notable locations in the subdivision. All places marked in the map are linked in the larger full screen map. All the four subdivisions are presented with maps on the same scale – the size of the maps vary as per the area of the subdivision.

== Demographics ==
According to the 2011 Census of India, Gopalpur had a total population of 7,818, of which 3,920 (50%) were males and 3,898 (50%) were females. Population in the age range 0–6 years was 588. The total number of literate persons in Gopalpur was 6,650 (91.98% of the population over 6 years).

The following municipality and census towns were part of Chakdaha Urban Agglomeration in 2011 census: Chakdaha (M), Parbbatipur (CT), Gopalpur (CT), Belgharia (CT), Punglia (CT) and Lalpur (P) (CT).

As of 2001 India census, Gopalpur had a population of 6,480. Males constitute 51% of the population and females 49%. Gopalpur has an average literacy rate of 81%, higher than the national average of 59.5%: male literacy is 85%, and female literacy is 77%. In Gopalpur, 9% of the population is under 6 years of age.

== Infrastructure ==
According to the District Census Handbook 2011, Nadia, Gopalpur covered an area of 1.53 km^{2}. Among the civic amenities, it had 15 km roads with open drains, the protected water supply involved BWT, hand pump, tubewell, borewell. It had 1,800 domestic electric connections, 350 road light points. Among the medical facilities it had 6 medicine shops. Among the educational facilities it had 4 primary schools, 1 middle school, 1 secondary school, 1 senior secondary school. It had 1 recognised short-hand typewriting and vocational training institute. Among the social, recreational and cultural facilities it had 1 cinema theatre, 1 public library, 1 reading room. It had branch office of 1 nationalised bank.

== Transport ==
Payradanga railway station, located nearby, is well connected by the local train transport system to the Sealdah-Ranaghat Line.

== Healthcare ==
Habibpur (Jadav Dutta) Rural Hospital, with 30 beds at Habibpur, is the major government medical facility in the Ranaghat I CD block.
