= Halalpur Krishnapur =

- Census Town
- Location in West Bengal, India Halalpur Krishnapur (India)
- Coordinates: 23.203505°N 88.588553°E
- Country: India
- State: West Bengal
- District: Nadia

Area
  - Total: 2.4912 km^{2} (0.9619 sq mi)

Population (2011)
  - Total: 5,202
  - Density: 2,088/km^{2} (5,408/sq mi)

Languages
  - Official: Bengali, English
- Time zone: UTC+5:30 (IST)
- PIN: 741202
- Telephone/STD code: 03454
- Lok Sabha constituency: Ranaghat
- Vidhan Sabha constituency: Ranaghat Uttar Paschim
- Website: nadia.gov.in

Halalpur Krishnapur is a census town in the Ranaghat II CD block in the Ranaghat subdivision of the Nadia district in the state of West Bengal, India.

== Geography ==
Cities and towns in Ranaghat subdivision of Nadia district
M: municipal town/ city/notified area, CT: census town, R: rural/ urban centre.
Owing to space constraints in the small map, the actual locations in a larger map may vary slightly

=== Location ===
Halalpur Krishnapur is located at 23.203505°N 88.588553°E.

The maps of Ranaghat I and Ranaghat II CD blocks, in the District Census Handbook 2011, Nadia, shows the census towns of Kamgachhi, Raghabpur, Panpara, Aistala, Satigachha, Anulia, Halalpur Krishnapur, Hijuli and Ranaghat (CT) forming a cluster around Ranaghat. Certain other localities such as Nokari, Nasra, Cooper's Camp, Birnagar, Habibpur, Gopalpur and Parbbatipur are also linked with this cluster.

=== Area overview ===
Nadia district is mostly alluvial plains lying to the east of Hooghly River, locally known as Bhagirathi. The alluvial plains are cut across by such distributaries as Jalangi, Churni and Ichhamati. With these rivers getting silted up, floods are a recurring feature. The Ranaghat subdivision has the Bhagirathi on the west, with Purba Bardhaman and Hooghly districts lying across the river. Topographically, Ranaghat subdivision is spread across the Krishnanagar-Santipur Plain, which occupies the central part of the district, and the Ranaghat-Chakdaha Plain, the low-lying area found in the south-eastern part of the district. The Churni separates the two plains. A portion of the east forms the boundary with Bangladesh. The lower portion of the east is covered by a portion of the North 24 Parganas district. The subdivision has achieved reasonably high urbanisation. 41.68% of the population lives in urban areas and 58.32% lives in rural areas.

Note: The map alongside presents some of the notable locations in the subdivision. All places marked in the map are linked in the larger full screen map. All the four subdivisions are presented with maps on the same scale – the size of the maps vary as per the area of the subdivision.

== Demographics ==
According to the 2011 Census of India, Halalpur Krishnapur had a total population of 5,202, of which 2,676 (51%) were males and 2,526 (49%) were females. Population in the age range 0–6 years was 432. The total number of literate persons in Halalpur Krishnapur was 3,904 (81.84% of the population over 6 years).

The following municipalities, notified area, outgrowths and census towns were part of Ranaghat Urban Agglomeration in 2011 census: Ranaghat (M), Birnagar (M), Cooper's Camp (NA), Magurkhali (OG), Ranaghat (CT) (CT), Hijuli (CT), Aistala (CT), Satigachha (CT), Nasra (CT), Panpara (CT), Raghabpur (CT), Kamgachhi (CT), Anulia (CT) and Halalpur Krishnapur (CT).

== Infrastructure ==
According to the District Census Handbook 2011, Nadia, Halalpur Krishnapur covered an area of 2.4912 km^{2}. Among the civic amenities, the protected water supply involved BWT, tubewell, borewell. It had 720 domestic electric connections, 45 road light points. Among the medical facilities, the nearest dispensary/ health centre was 6 km away. Among the educational facilities it had 1 primary school, other school facilities at Hijuli 2 km away. Three important commodities it produced were silver ornaments, carpentry items, powerloom products. It had branch offices of 2 nationalised banks, 2 private commercial banks, 2 cooperative banks, 1 agricultural credit society, 2 non-agricultural credit societies.

== Transport ==
Kalinarayanpur Junction railway station, located nearby, is on the Sealdah-Krishnanagar line of the Kolkata Suburban Railway system.

== Healthcare ==
Aranghata Rural Hospital, with 30 beds at Aranghata, is the major government medical facility in the Ranaghat II CD block.
