= Aistala =

Aistala Garer Bagan
- Census Town
- Location in West Bengal, India Aistala Garer Bagan (India)
- Coordinates: 23.1894°N 88.5589°E
- Country: India
- State: West Bengal
- District: Nadia

Area
  - Total: 2.94 km^{2} (1.14 sq mi)

Population (2011)
  - Total: 20,662
  - Density: 7,030/km^{2} (18,200/sq mi)

Languages
  - Official: Bengali, English
- Time zone: UTC+5:30 (IST)
- ISO 3166 code: IN-WB
- Vehicle registration: WB
- Website: nadia.nic.in

Aistala is a census town in the Ranaghat I CD block in the Ranaghat subdivision of the Nadia district in the Indian state of West Bengal.

== Geography ==
Cities and towns in Ranaghat subdivision of Nadia district
M: municipal town/ city/notified area, CT: census town, R: rural/ urban centre.
Owing to space constraints in the small map, the actual locations in a larger map may vary slightly

=== Location ===
Aistala is located at 23.1894°N 88.5589°E.

The maps of Ranaghat I and Ranaghat II CD blocks, in the District Census Handbook 2011, Nadia, shows the census towns of Kamgachhi, Raghabpur, Panpara, Aistala, Satigachha, Anulia, Halalpur Krishnapur, Hijuli and Ranaghat (CT) forming a cluster around Ranaghat. Certain other localities such as Nokari, Nasra, Cooper's Camp, Birnagar, Habibpur, Gopalpur and Parbbatipur are also linked with this cluster.

=== Area overview ===
Nadia district is mostly alluvial plains lying to the east of Hooghly River, locally known as Bhagirathi. The alluvial plains are cut across by such distributaries as Jalangi, Churni and Ichhamati. With these rivers getting silted up, floods are a recurring feature. The Ranaghat subdivision has the Bhagirathi on the west, with Purba Bardhaman and Hooghly districts lying across the river. Topographically, Ranaghat subdivision is spread across the Krishnanagar-Santipur Plain, which occupies the central part of the district, and the Ranaghat-Chakdaha Plain, the low-lying area found in the south-eastern part of the district. The Churni separates the two plains. A portion of the east forms the boundary with Bangladesh. The lower portion of the east is covered by a portion of the North 24 Parganas district. The subdivision has achieved reasonably high urbanisation. 41.68% of the population lives in urban areas and 58.32% lives in rural areas.

Note: The map alongside presents some of the notable locations in the subdivision. All places marked in the map are linked in the larger full screen map. All the four subdivisions are presented with maps on the same scale – the size of the maps vary as per the area of the subdivision.

== Demographics ==
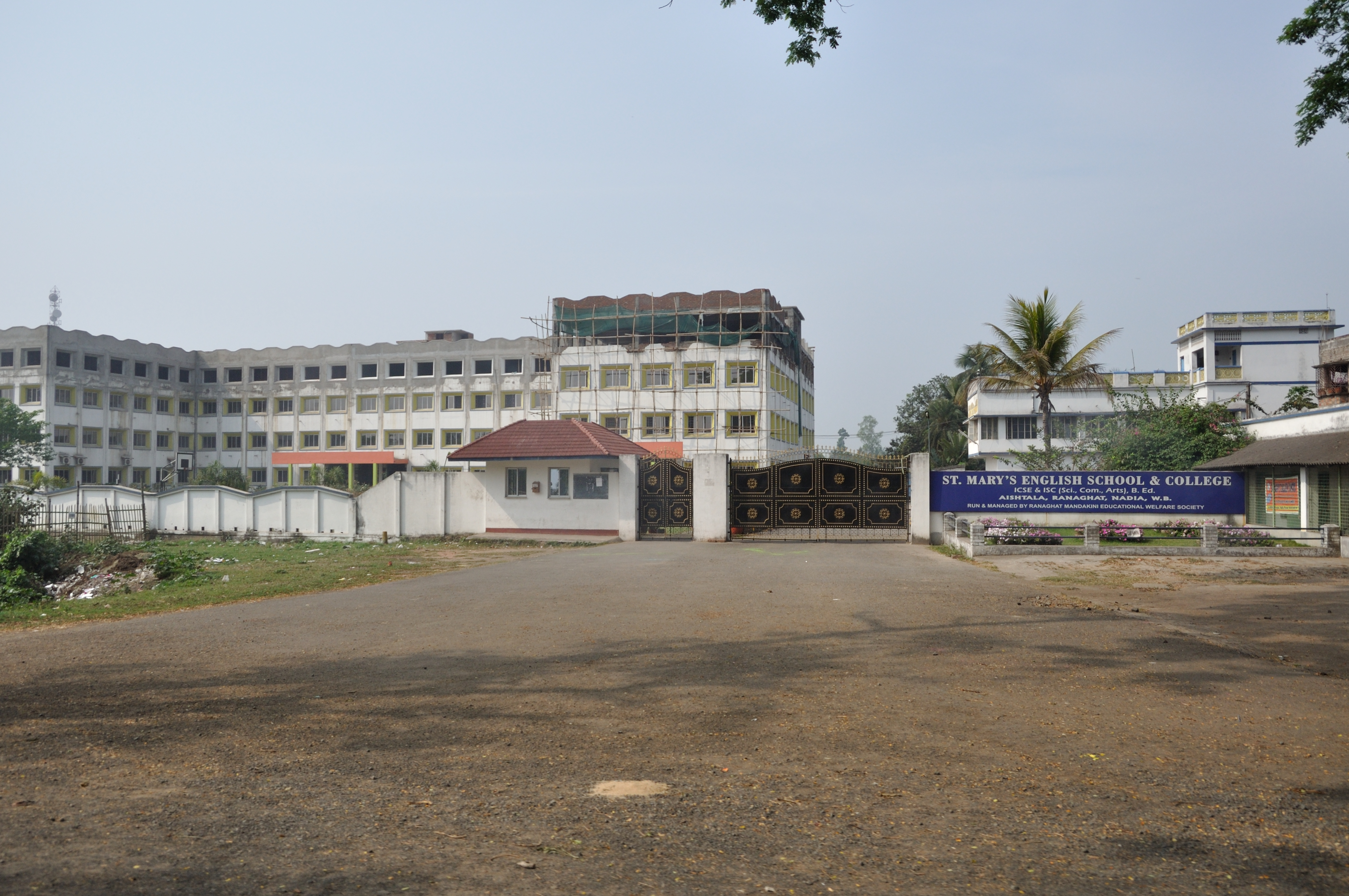
St Mary's English School & College, Aistala

According to the 2011 Census of India, Aistala had a total population of 20,662, of which 10,701 (52%) were males and 9,961 (48%) were females. Population in the age range 0–6 years was 1,816. The total number of literate persons in Aistala was 15,913 (84.44% of the population over 6 years).

The following municipalities, notified area, outgrowths and census towns were part of Ranaghat Urban Agglomeration in 2011 census: Ranaghat (M), Birnagar (M), Cooper's Camp (NA), Magurkhali (OG), Ranaghat (CT) (CT), Hijuli (CT), Aistala (CT), Satigachha (CT), Nasra (CT), Panpara (CT), Raghabpur (CT), Kamgachhi (CT), Anulia (CT) and Halalpur Krishnapur (CT).

As of 2001 India census, Aistala had a population of 19,425. Males constitute 51% of the population and females 49%. Aistala has an average literacy rate of 70%, higher than the national average of 59.5%; with 56% of the males and 44% of females literate. 10% of the population is under 6 years of age.

== Infrastructure ==
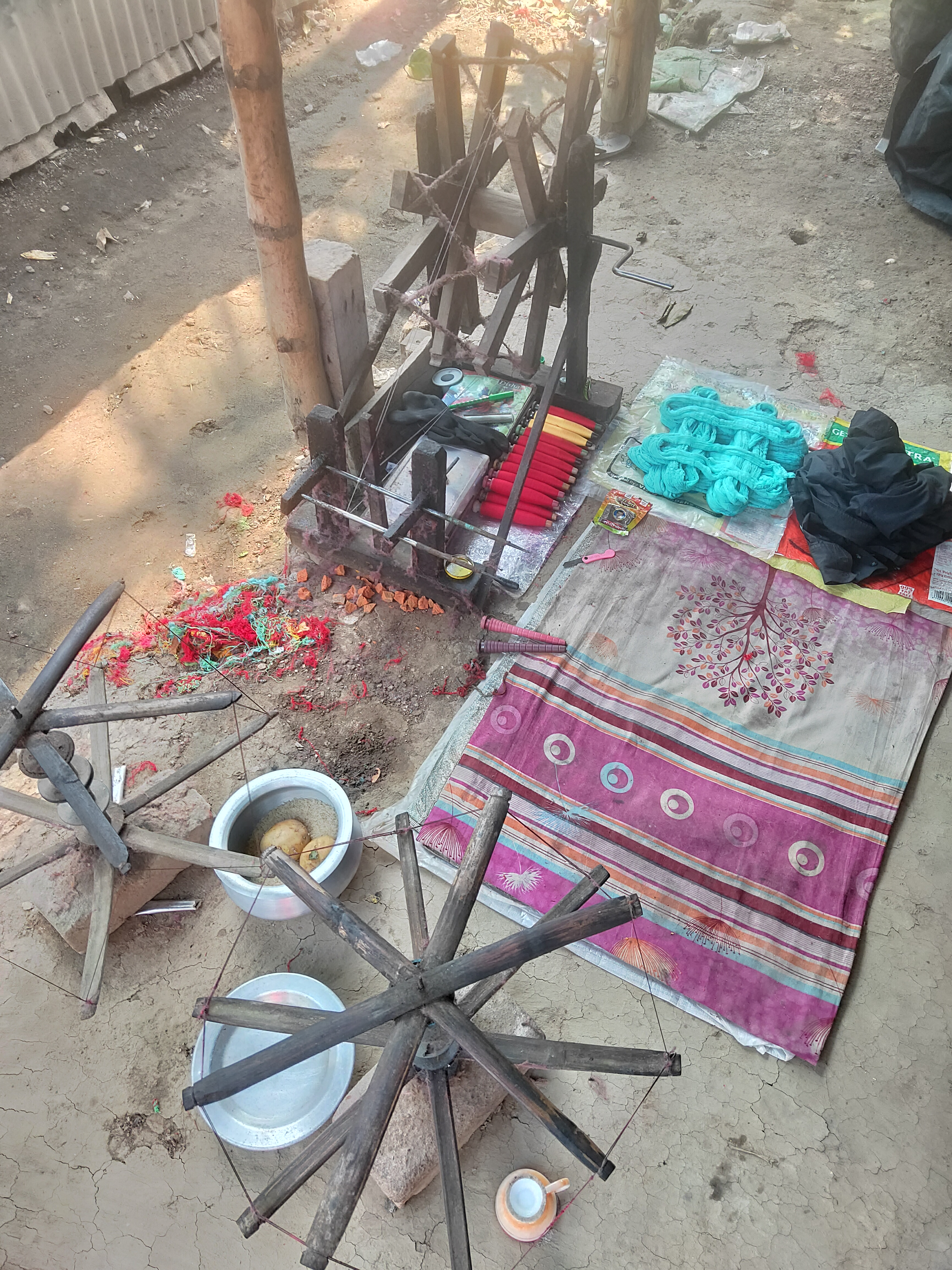
Sparkle or Spinning wheel or spinner (চরকা), the main supplier of threads to produce hand loom sari at Aistala

According to the District Census Handbook 2011, Nadia, Aistala covered an area of 2.94 km^{2}. Among the civic amenities, it had 6 km roads with open drains, the protected water supply involved tubewell, borewell. It had 11,000 domestic electric connections, 300 road light points. Among the medical facilities it had 1 hospital, 1 mobile health clinic, 11 medicine shops. Among the educational facilities it had 7 primary schools, 1 secondary school, 1 senior secondary school. Among the social, recreational and cultural facilities it had 1 public library. Three important commodities it produced were handloom sari, power loom products, plastic flowers. It had branch offices of 1 nationalised bank, 1 non-agricultural credit society.

== Transport ==
Ranaghat Junction railway station, located nearby, is on the Sealdah-Ranaghat line of the Kolkata Suburban Railway system.

== Healthcare ==
Habibpur (Jadav Dutta) Rural Hospital, with 30 beds at Habibpur, is the major government medical facility in the Ranaghat I CD block.
