= Nokari =

Village in West Bengal, Indiagh

- Village
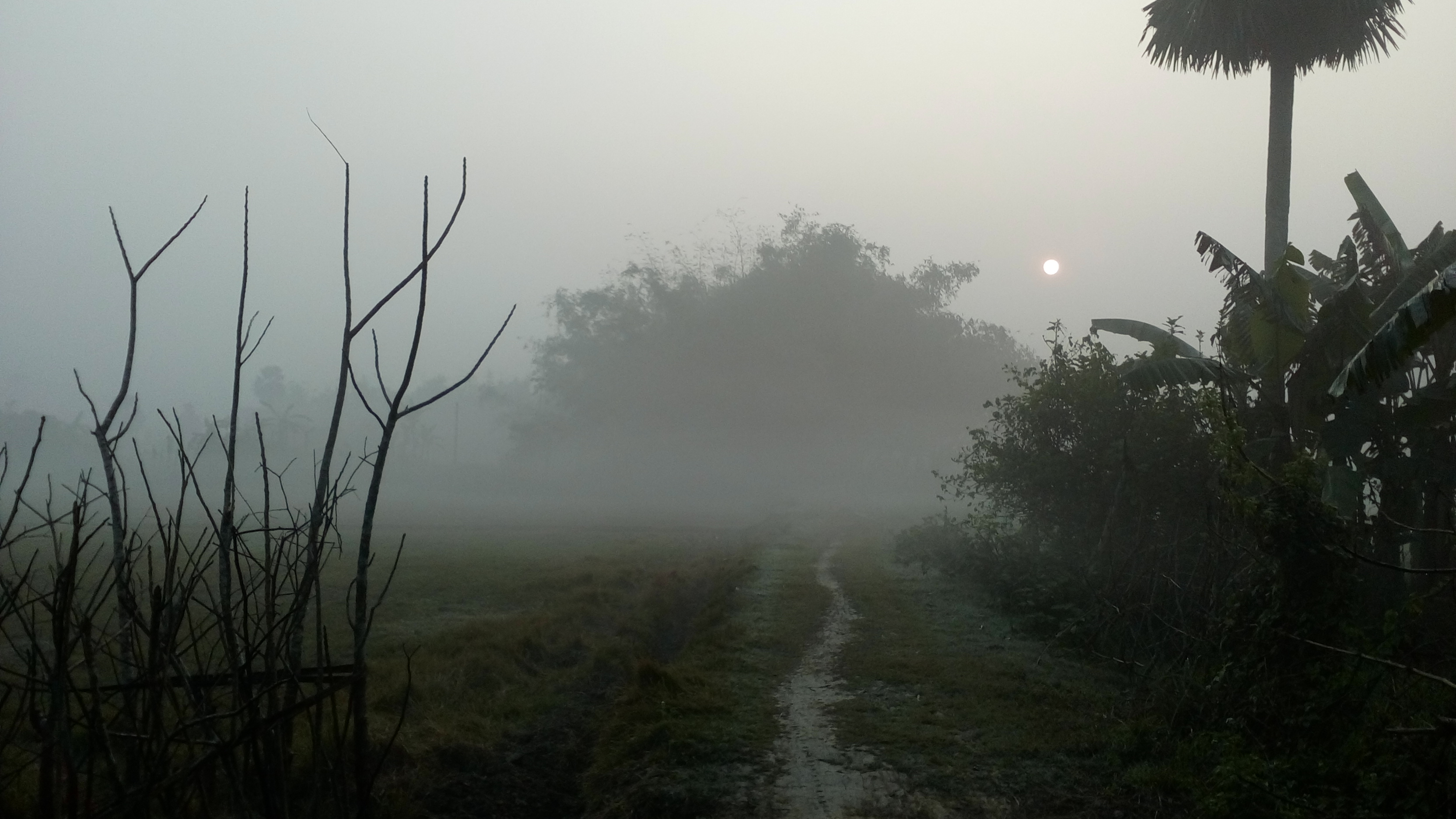
- Nokari in winter

- Location in West Bengal, India Nokari (India)
- Coordinates: 23.182751°N 88.596849°E
- Country: India
- State: West Bengal
- District: Nadia

Population (2011)
  - Total: 5,032

Languages
  - Official: Bengali, English
- Time zone: UTC+5:30 (IST)
- Telephone/STD code: 03454
- Lok Sabha constituency: Ranaghat
- Vidhan Sabha constituency: Ranaghat Dakshin
- Website: nadia.gov.in

Nokari is a village in the Ranaghat II CD block in the Ranaghat subdivision of the Nadia district in the state of West Bengal, India

== Geography ==
Cities and towns in Ranaghat subdivision of Nadia district
M: municipal town/ city/notified area, CT: census town, R: rural/ urban centre.
Owing to space constraints in the small map, the actual locations in a larger map may vary slightly

=== Location ===
Nokari is located at 23.182751°N 88.596849°E.

The maps of Ranaghat I and Ranaghat II CD blocks, in the District Census Handbook 2011, Nadia, shows the census towns of Kamgachhi, Raghabpur, Panpara, Aistala, Satigachha, Anulia, Halalpur Krishnapur, Hijuli and Ranaghat (CT) forming a cluster around Ranaghat. Certain other localities such as Nokari, Nasra, Cooper's Camp, Birnagar, Habibpur, Gopalpur and Parbbatipur are also linked with this cluster.

=== Area overview ===
Nadia district is mostly alluvial plains lying to the east of Hooghly River, locally known as Bhagirathi. The alluvial plains are cut across by such distributaries as Jalangi, Churni and Ichhamati. With these rivers getting silted up, floods are a recurring feature. The Ranaghat subdivision has the Bhagirathi on the west, with Purba Bardhaman and Hooghly districts lying across the river. Topographically, Ranaghat subdivision is spread across the Krishnanagar-Santipur Plain, which occupies the central part of the district, and the Ranaghat-Chakdaha Plain, the low-lying area found in the south-eastern part of the district. The Churni separates the two plains. A portion of the east forms the boundary with Bangladesh. The lower portion of the east is covered by a portion of the North 24 Parganas district. The subdivision has achieved reasonably high urbanisation. 41.68% of the population lives in urban areas and 58.32% lives in rural areas.

Note: The map alongside presents some of the notable locations in the subdivision. All places marked in the map are linked in the larger full screen map. All the four subdivisions are presented with maps on the same scale – the size of the maps vary as per the area of the subdivision.

== Demographics ==
According to the 2011 Census of India, Nokari had a total population of 5,032, of which 2,582 (51%) were males and 2,450 (49%) were females. Population in the age range 0–6 years was 443. The total number of literate persons in Nokari was 3,583 (78.08% of the population over 6 years).

== Civic administration ==
=== CD block HQ ===
The headquarters of Ranaghat II CD block are located at Nokari.

== Economy ==
There is a Bank of India branch in Nokari beside flower market and a Kisan CO-Operative Bank Near Nokari Gram Panchayat Office.

Nokari flower market provides a variety of flowers for decorations and other purposes.

== Education ==
Nokari GSFP Primary School is the only primary school of Nokari.

== Transport ==
A short stretch of Ranaghat-Duttapulia Road connects Nokari to Aistala, where National Highway 12 (India) meets State Highway 11 (West Bengal).

== Gallery ==
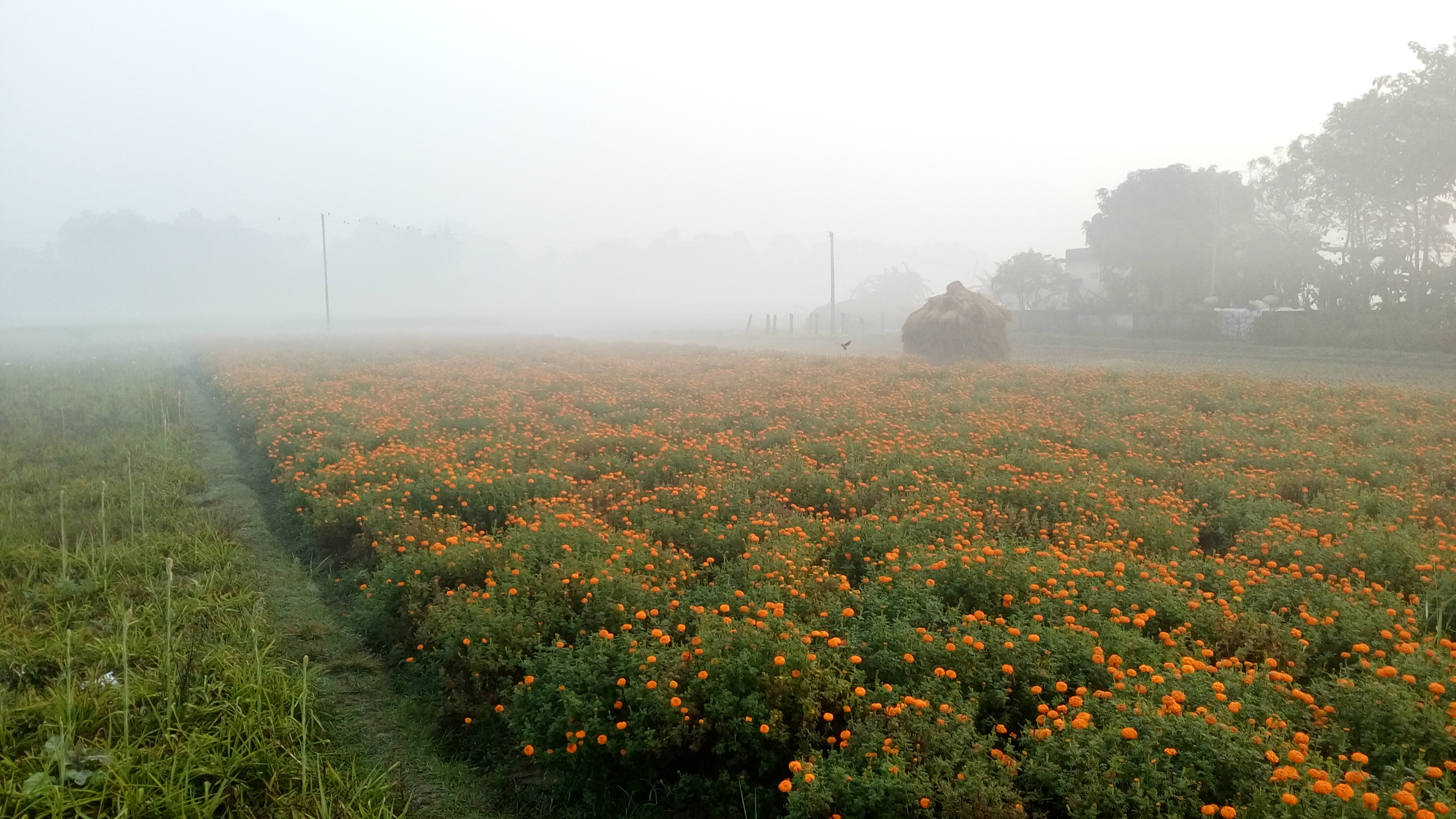
Marigold Field

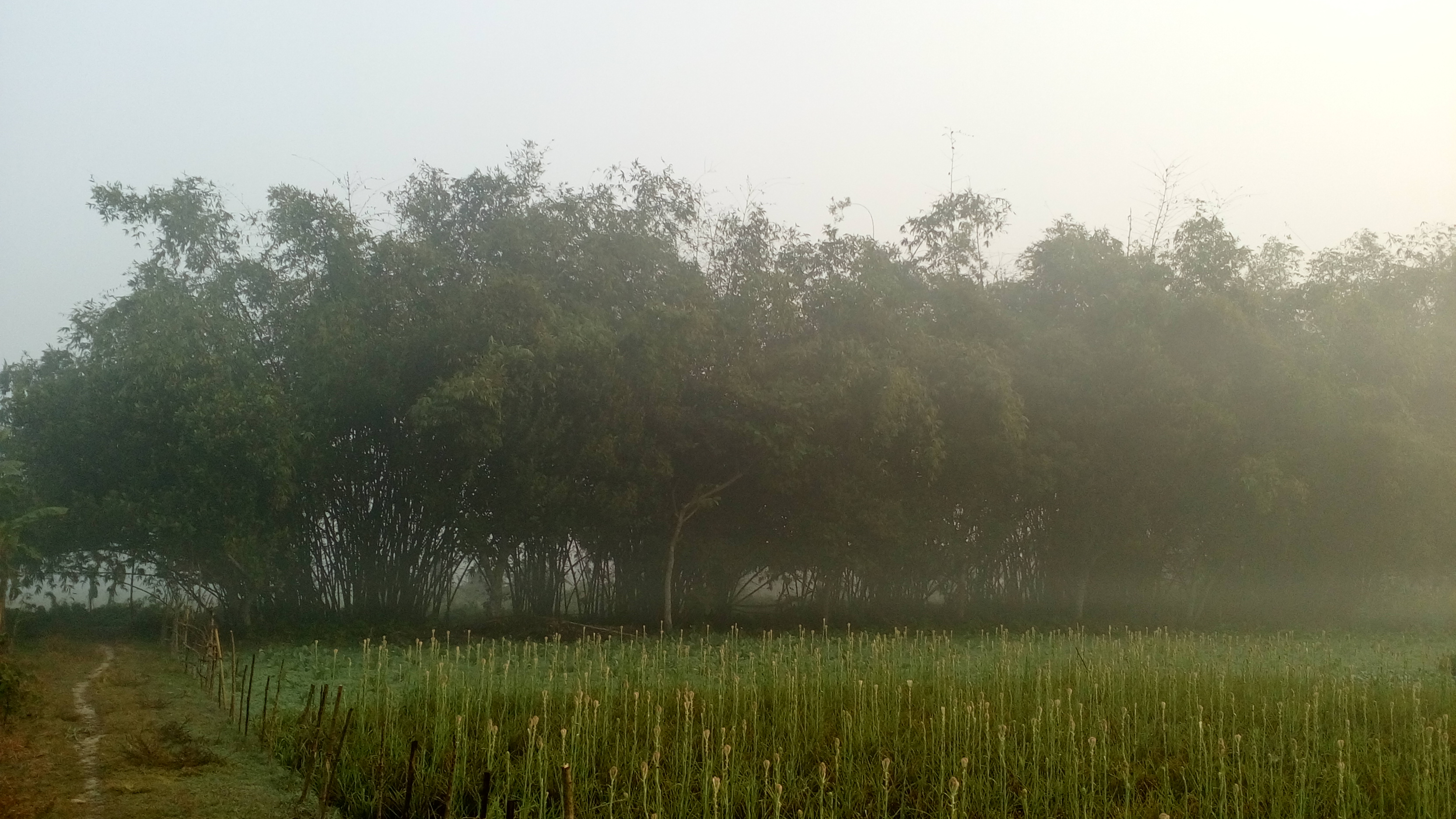
Nokari

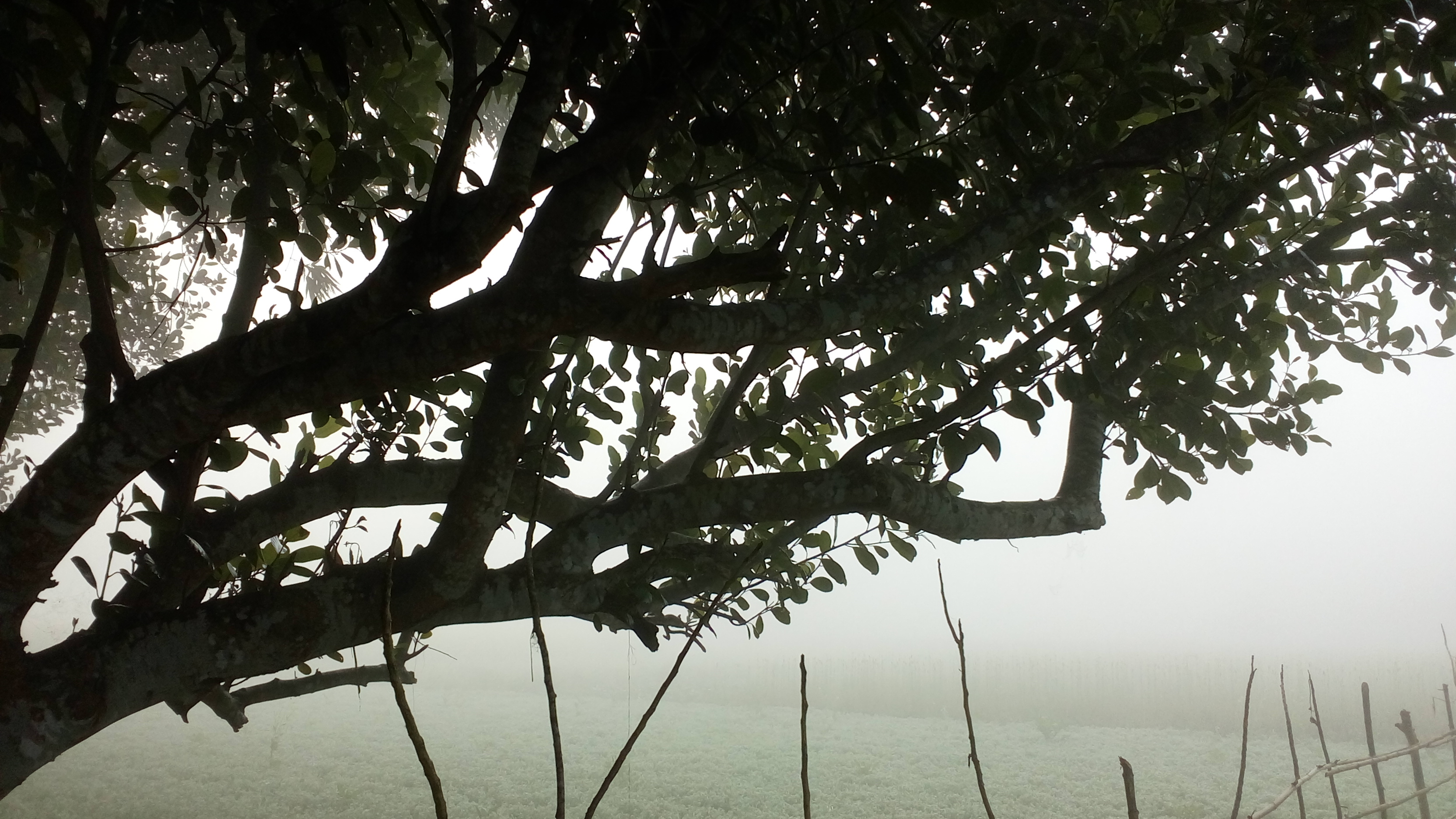
Nokari in Winter

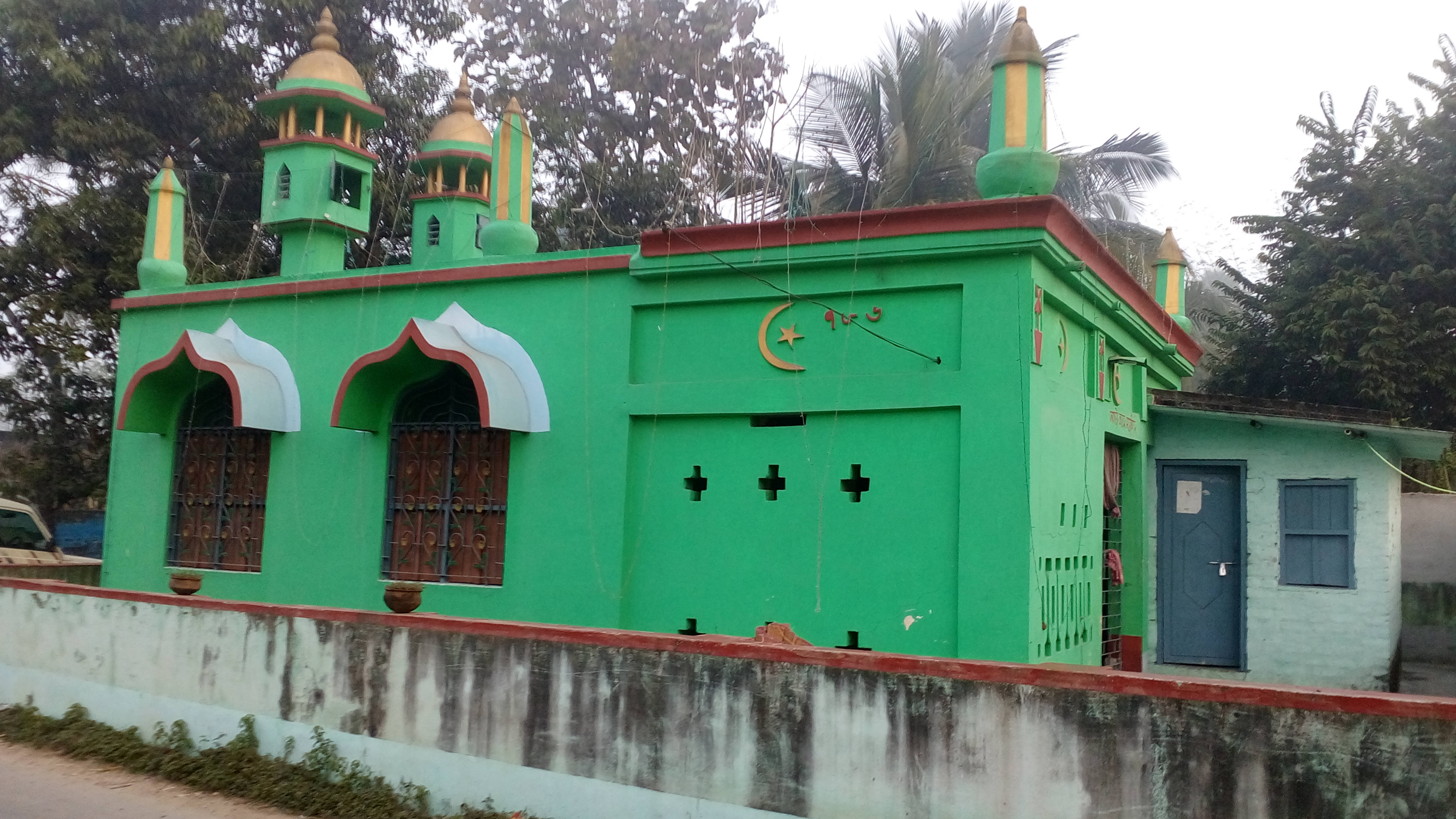
Nokari jame mosque

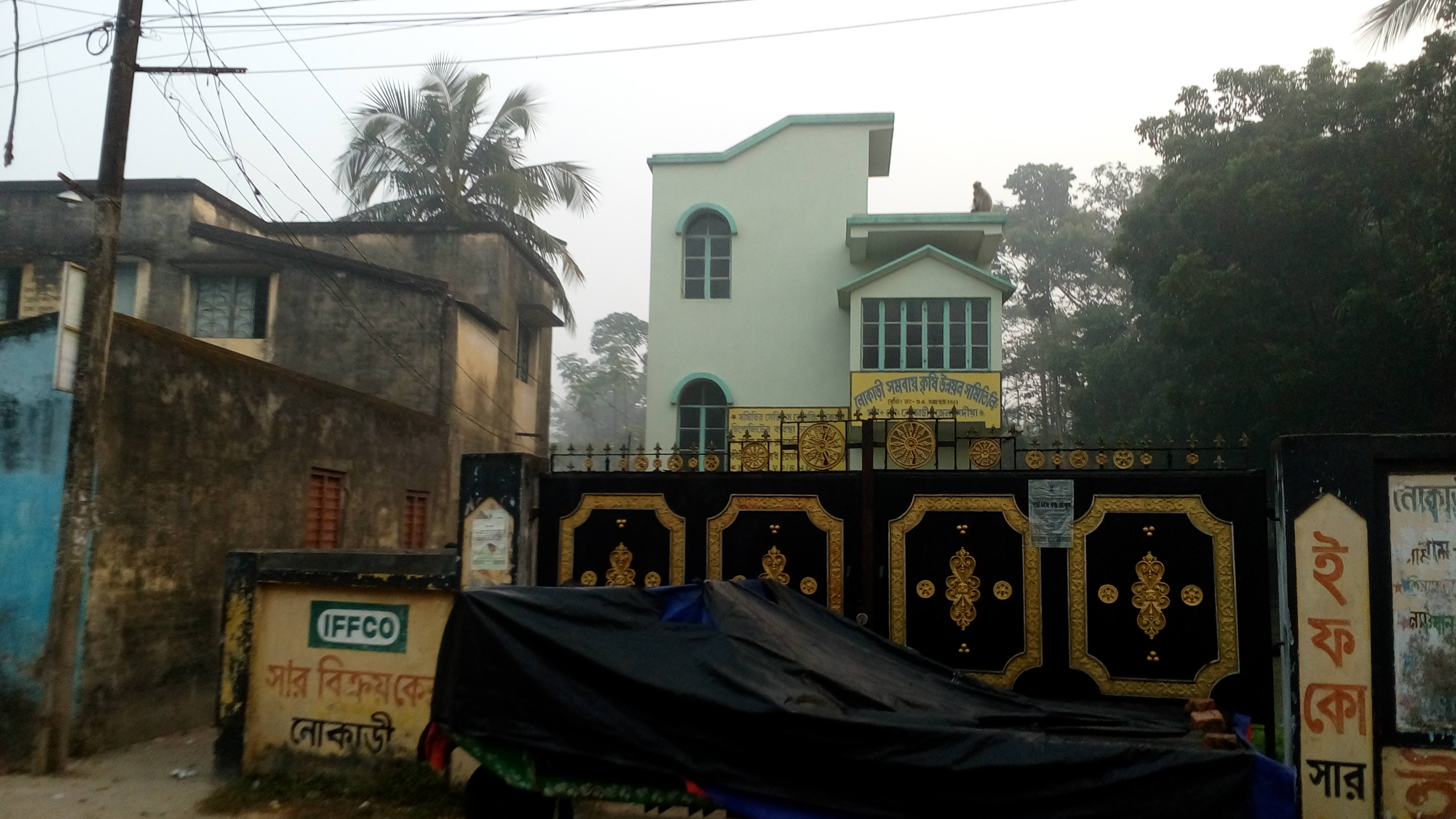
Kisan cooperative bank

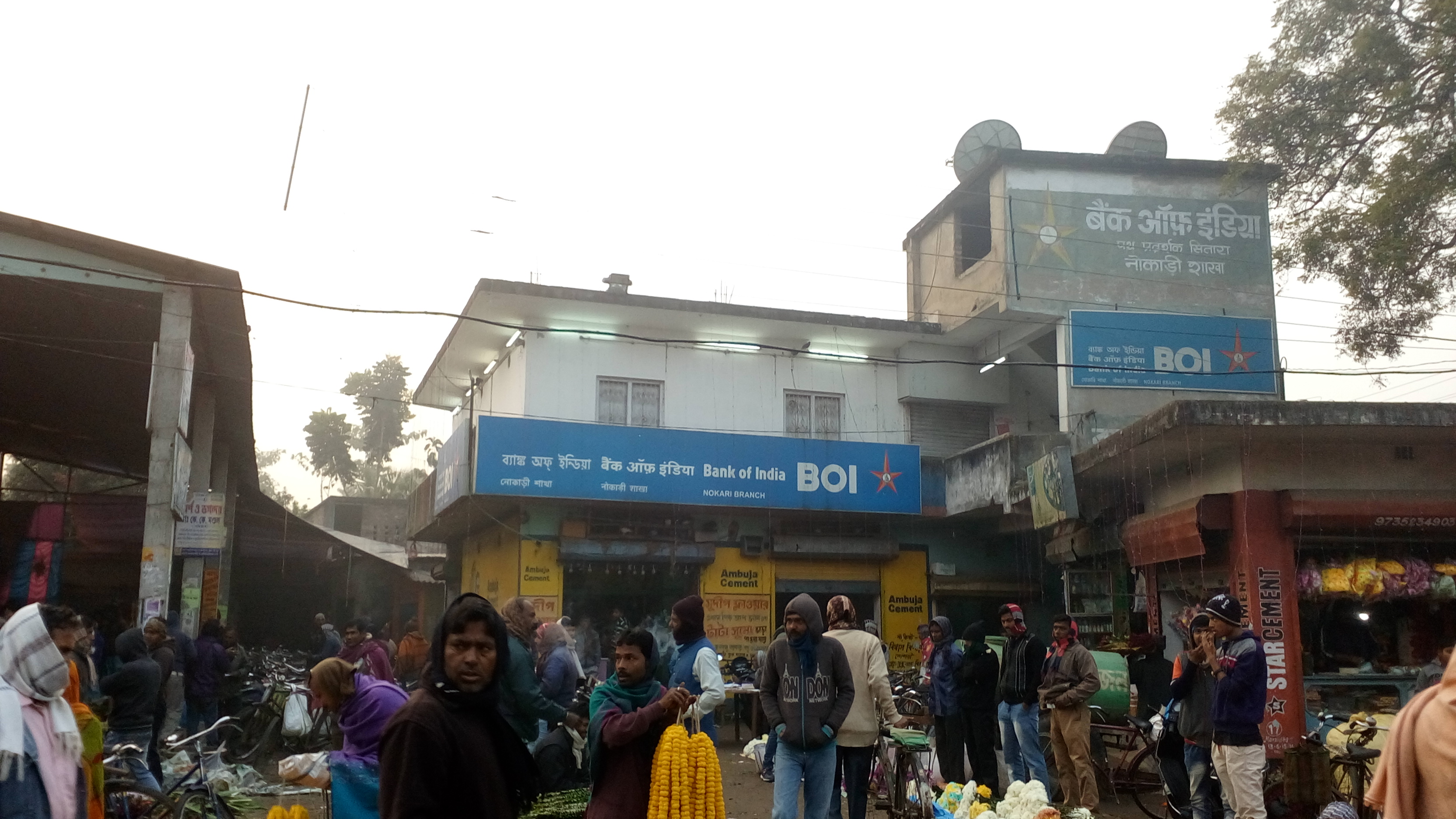
Bank of India branch in front flower market

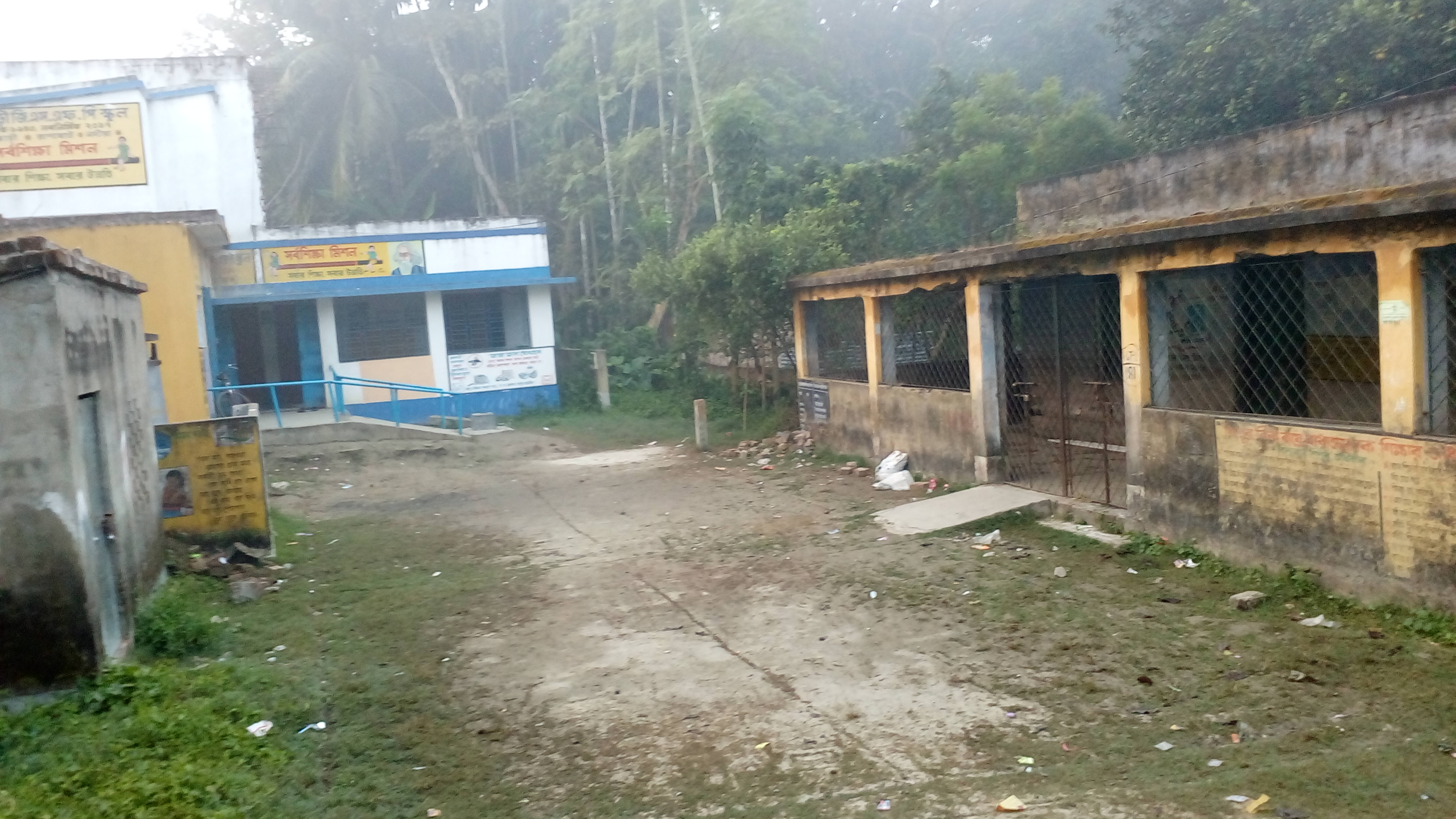
Nokari GSFP Primary School

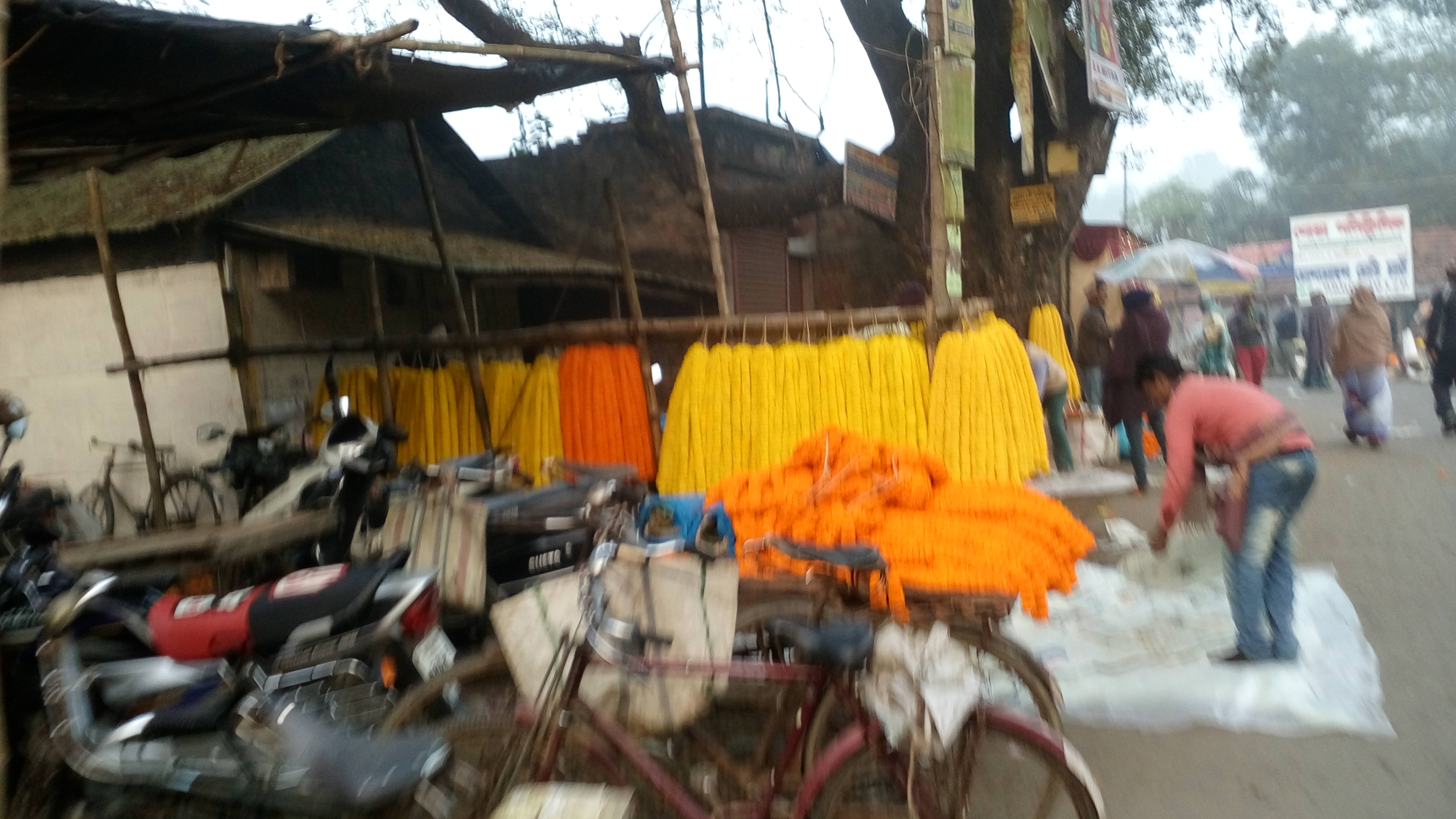
Nokari Flower Market

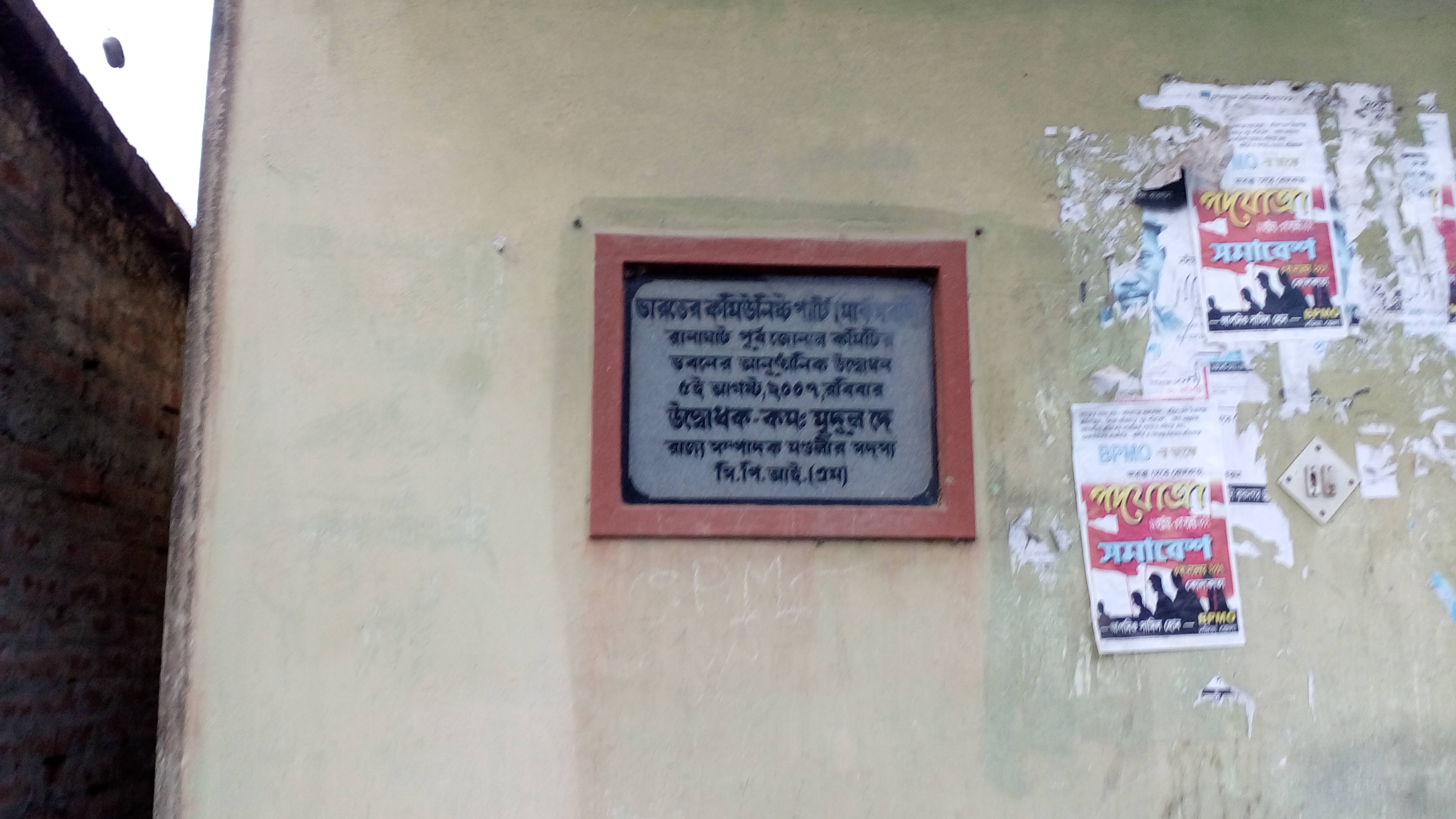
CPM office
