= Nasra, Ranaghat =

Nasra
- Census Town
- Location in West Bengal, India Nasra (India)
- Coordinates: 23°09′52″N 88°34′22″E
- Country: India
- State: West Bengal
- District: Nadia

Area
  - Total: 3.12 km^{2} (1.20 sq mi)

Population (2011)
  - Total: 10,707
  - Density: 3,430/km^{2} (8,890/sq mi)

Languages
  - Official: Bengali, English
- Time zone: UTC+5:30 (IST)
- Vehicle registration: WB
- Website: wb.gov.in

Nasra is a census town in the Ranaghat II CD block in the Ranaghat subdivision of the Nadia district in the Indian state of West Bengal.

== Geography ==
Cities and towns in Ranaghat subdivision of Nadia district
M: municipal town/ city/notified area, CT: census town, R: rural/ urban centre.
Owing to space constraints in the small map, the actual locations in a larger map may vary slightly

=== Location ===
The maps of Ranaghat I and Ranaghat II CD blocks, in the District Census Handbook 2011, Nadia, shows the census towns of Kamgachhi, Raghabpur, Panpara, Aistala, Satigachha, Anulia, Halalpur Krishnapur, Hijuli and Ranaghat (CT) forming a cluster around Ranaghat. Certain other localities such as Nokari, Nasra, Cooper's Camp, Birnagar, Habibpur, Gopalpur and Parbbatipur are also linked with this cluster.

Nadia district is mostly alluvial plains lying to the east of Hooghly River, locally known as Bhagirathi. The alluvial plains are cut across by such distributaries as Jalangi, Churni and Ichhamati. With these rivers getting silted up, floods are a recurring feature.

=== Area overview ===
Nadia district is mostly alluvial plains lying to the east of Hooghly River, locally known as Bhagirathi. The alluvial plains are cut across by such distributaries as Jalangi, Churni and Ichhamati. With these rivers getting silted up, floods are a recurring feature. The Ranaghat subdivision has the Bhagirathi on the west, with Purba Bardhaman and Hooghly districts lying across the river. Topographically, Ranaghat subdivision is spread across the Krishnanagar-Santipur Plain, which occupies the central part of the district, and the Ranaghat-Chakdaha Plain, the low-lying area found in the south-eastern part of the district. The Churni separates the two plains. A portion of the east forms the boundary with Bangladesh. The lower portion of the east is covered by a portion of the North 24 Parganas district. The subdivision has achieved reasonably high urbanisation. 41.68% of the population lives in urban areas and 58.32% lives in rural areas.

Note: The map alongside presents some of the notable locations in the subdivision. All places marked in the map are linked in the larger full screen map. All the four subdivisions are presented with maps on the same scale – the size of the maps vary as per the area of the subdivision.

== Demographics ==
According to the 2011 Census of India, Nasra had a total population of 10,707, of which 5,399 (50%) were males and 5,308 (50%) were females. Population in the age range 0–6 years was 847. The total number of literate persons in Nasra was 8,745 (88.69% of the population over 6 years).

The following municipalities, notified area, outgrowths and census towns were part of Ranaghat Urban Agglomeration in 2011 census: Ranaghat (M), Birnagar (M), Cooper's Camp (NA), Magurkhali (OG), Ranaghat (CT) (CT), Hijuli (CT), Aistala (CT), Satigachha (CT), Nasra (CT), Panpara (CT), Raghabpur (CT), Kamgachhi (CT), Anulia (CT) and Halalpur Krishnapur (CT).

As of 2001 India census, Nasra had a population of 10,560. Males constitute 50% of the population and females 50%. Nasra has an average literacy rate of 77%, higher than the national average of 59.5%: male literacy is 83%, and female literacy is 72%. In Nasra, 9% of the population is under 6 years of age.

== Infrastructure ==
According to the District Census Handbook 2011, Nadia, Nasra covered an area of 3.12 km^{2}. Among the civic amenities, it had 20 km roads with both open and closed drains, the protected water supply involved overhead tank, tap water from untreated sources, hand pump. It had 1,256 domestic electric connections, 82 road light points. Among the medical facilities, it had 1 dispensary/ health centre, 1 family welfare centre, 1 charitable hospital/ nursing home, 14 medicine shops. Among the educational facilities it had 8 primary schools, 2 middle schools, 2 secondary schools, the nearest senior secondary school at Ranaghat 4 km away. It had 1 non-formal education centre (Sarva Siksha Abhiyan). Three important commodities it produced were bakery products, garments, hand gloves. It had branch office of 1 nationalised bank.

== Transport ==
Ranaghat Junction railway station, located nearby, is on the Sealdah-Ranaghat line of the Kolkata Suburban Railway system.
