= Anulia =

- Census Town
- Location in West Bengal, India Anulia (India)
- Coordinates: 23.156505°N 88.551753°E
- Country: India
- State: West Bengal
- District: Nadia

Area
  - Total: 2.5373 km^{2} (0.9797 sq mi)

Population (2011)
  - Total: 5,220
  - Density: 2,060/km^{2} (5,330/sq mi)

Languages
  - Official: Bengali, English
- Time zone: UTC+5:30 (IST)
- PIN: 741255
- Telephone/STD code: 03454
- Lok Sabha constituency: Ranaghat
- Vidhan Sabha constituency: Ranaghat North West
- Website: nadia.gov.in

Anulia is a census town in the Ranaghat I CD block in the Ranaghat subdivision of the Nadia district in the state of West Bengal, India.

== Geography ==
Cities and towns in Ranaghat subdivision of Nadia district
M: municipal town/ city/notified area, CT: census town, R: rural/ urban centre.
Owing to space constraints in the small map, the actual locations in a larger map may vary slightly

=== Located ===
Anulia is located at 23.156505°N 88.551753°E.

The maps of Ranaghat I and Ranaghat II CD blocks, in the District Census Handbook 2011, Nadia, shows the census towns of Kamgachhi, Raghabpur, Panpara, Aistala, Satigachha, Anulia, Halalpur Krishnapur, Hijuli and Ranaghat (CT) forming a cluster around Ranaghat. Certain other localities such as Nokari, Nasra, Cooper's Camp, Birnagar, Habibpur, Gopalpur and Parbbatipur are also linked with this cluster.

=== Area overview ===
Nadia district is mostly alluvial plains lying to the east of Hooghly River, locally known as Bhagirathi. The alluvial plains are cut across by such distributaries as Jalangi, Churni and Ichhamati. With these rivers getting silted up, floods are a recurring feature. The Ranaghat subdivision has the Bhagirathi on the west, with Purba Bardhaman and Hooghly districts lying across the river. Topographically, Ranaghat subdivision is spread across the Krishnanagar-Santipur Plain, which occupies the central part of the district, and the Ranaghat-Chakdaha Plain, the low-lying area found in the south-eastern part of the district. The Churni separates the two plains. A portion of the east forms the boundary with Bangladesh. The lower portion of the east is covered by a portion of the North 24 Parganas district. The subdivision has achieved reasonably high urbanisation. 41.68% of the population lives in urban areas and 58.32% lives in rural areas.

Note: The map alongside presents some of the notable locations in the subdivision. All places marked in the map are linked in the larger full screen map. All the four subdivisions are presented with maps on the same scale – the size of the maps vary as per the area of the subdivision.

== Demographics ==
According to the 2011 Census of India, Anulia had a total population of 5,220, of which 2,650 (51%) were males and 2,570 (49%) were females. Population in the age range 0–6 years was 482. The total number of literate persons in Anulia was 3,924 (82.82% of the population over 6 years).

The following municipalities, notified area, outgrowths and census towns were part of Ranaghat Urban Agglomeration in 2011 census: Ranaghat (M), Birnagar (M), Cooper's Camp (NA), Magurkhali (OG), Ranaghat (CT) (CT), Hijuli (CT), Aistala (CT), Satigachha (CT), Nasra (CT), Panpara (CT), Raghabpur (CT), Kamgachhi (CT), Anulia (CT) and Halalpur Krishnapur (CT).

== Infrastructure ==
According to the District Census Handbook 2011, Nadia, Anulia covered an area of 2.5373 km^{2} (0.9797 sq mi). Among the civic amenities, it had 3.5 km (2.2 mi) roads with open drains, the protected water supply involved BWT, tap water from treated sources, hand pump. It had 850 domestic electric connections, 200 road light points. Among the medical facilities it had one nursing home and five medicine shops. Among the educational facilities it had three primary schools, one middle school, one secondary school and one senior secondary school. Among the social, recreational and cultural facilities it had one orphanage home, one public library and one reading room. Three important commodities it produced were fitkari, tolly, cloth. It had branch offices of one agricultural credit society and one non-agricultural credit society.

== Education ==
Anulia High School is a Bengali-medium coeducational institution established in 1883. The school has facilities for teaching from class V to class XII. It has a library with 1,065 books, 20 computers and a playground.

== Healthcare ==
Ranaghat Subdivisional Hospital at PO Anulia functions with 171 beds.
