= Cooper's Camp =

Cooper's Camp Satellite Town of Ranaghat
- Township
- Location in West Bengal, India Cooper's Camp (India)
- Coordinates: 23.1687°N 88.5892°E
- Country: India
- State: West Bengal
- District: Nadia

Government
  - Type: Notified Area
  - Body: Cooper's Camp Notified Area

Area
  - Total: 1.50 km^{2} (0.58 sq mi)

Population (2011)
  - Total: 23,119
  - Density: 15,400/km^{2} (39,900/sq mi)

Languages
  - Official: Bengali, English
- Time zone: UTC+5:30 (IST)

Cooper's Camp is a satellite township and a notified area in Nadia district under Ranaghat police station of Ranaghat subdivision in the state of West Bengal, India.

== Geography ==
Cities and towns in Ranaghat subdivision of Nadia district
M: municipal town/ city/notified area, CT: census town, R: rural/ urban centre.
Owing to space constraints in the small map, the actual locations in a larger map may vary slightly

=== Location ===
Cooper's Camp is located at 23.1687°N 88.5892°E.

The maps of Ranaghat I and Ranaghat II CD blocks, in the District Census Handbook 2011, Nadia, shows the census towns of Kamgachhi, Raghabpur, Panpara, Aistala, Satigachha, Anulia, Halalpur Krishnapur, Hijuli and Ranaghat (CT) forming a cluster around Ranaghat. Certain other localities such as Nokari, Nasra, Cooper's Camp, Birnagar, Habibpur, Gopalpur and Parbbatipur are also linked with this cluster.

Nadia district is mostly alluvial plains lying to the east of Hooghly River, locally known as Bhagirathi. The alluvial plains are cut across by such distributaries as Jalangi, Churni and Ichhamati. With these rivers getting silted up, floods are a recurring feature.

=== Area overview ===
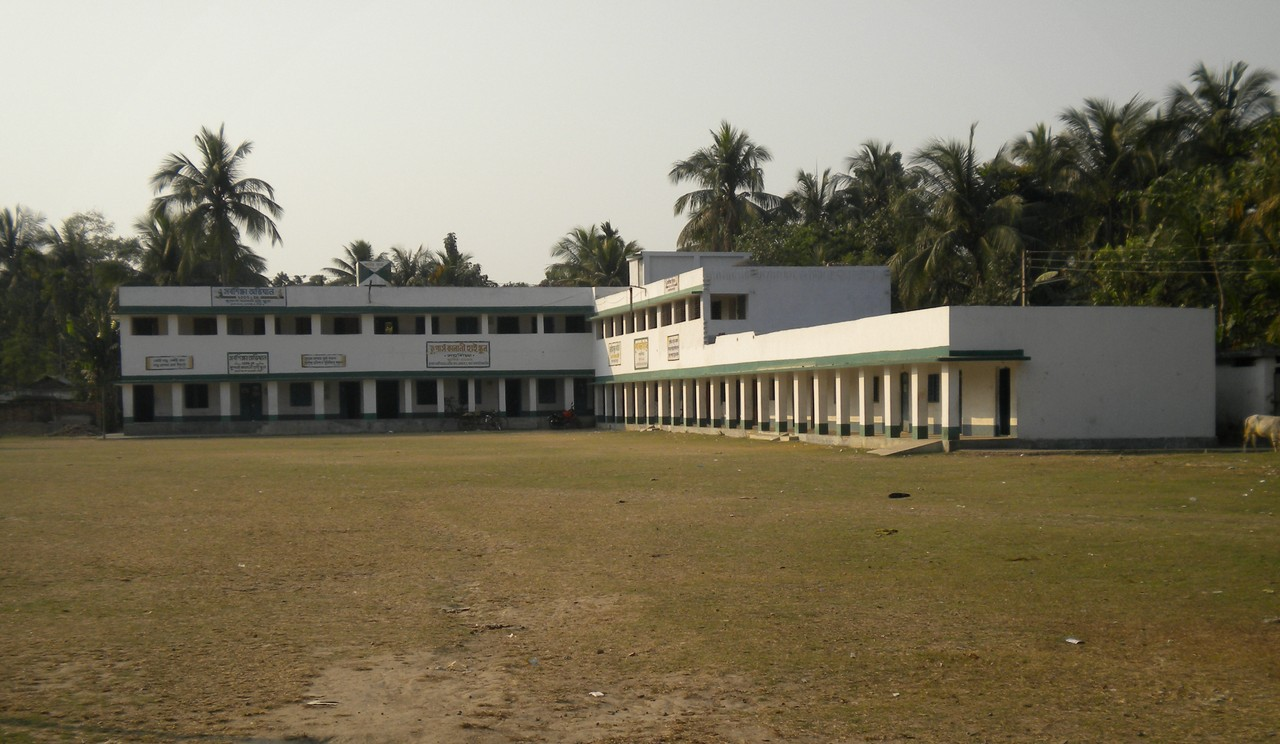
Cooper's Colony High School

Nadia district is mostly alluvial plains lying to the east of Hooghly River, locally known as Bhagirathi. The alluvial plains are cut across by such distributaries as Jalangi, Churni and Ichhamati. With these rivers getting silted up, floods are a recurring feature. The Ranaghat subdivision has the Bhagirathi on the west, with Purba Bardhaman and Hooghly districts lying across the river. Topographically, Ranaghat subdivision is spread across the Krishnanagar-Santipur Plain, which occupies the central part of the district, and the Ranaghat-Chakdaha Plain, the low-lying area found in the south-eastern part of the district. The Churni separates the two plains. A portion of the east forms the boundary with Bangladesh. The lower portion of the east is covered by a portion of the North 24 Parganas district. The subdivision has achieved reasonably high urbanisation. 41.68% of the population lives in urban areas and 58.32% lives in rural areas.

Note: The map alongside presents some of the notable locations in the subdivision. All places marked in the map are linked in the larger full screen map. All the four subdivisions are presented with maps on the same scale – the size of the maps vary as per the area of the subdivision.

== Demographics ==
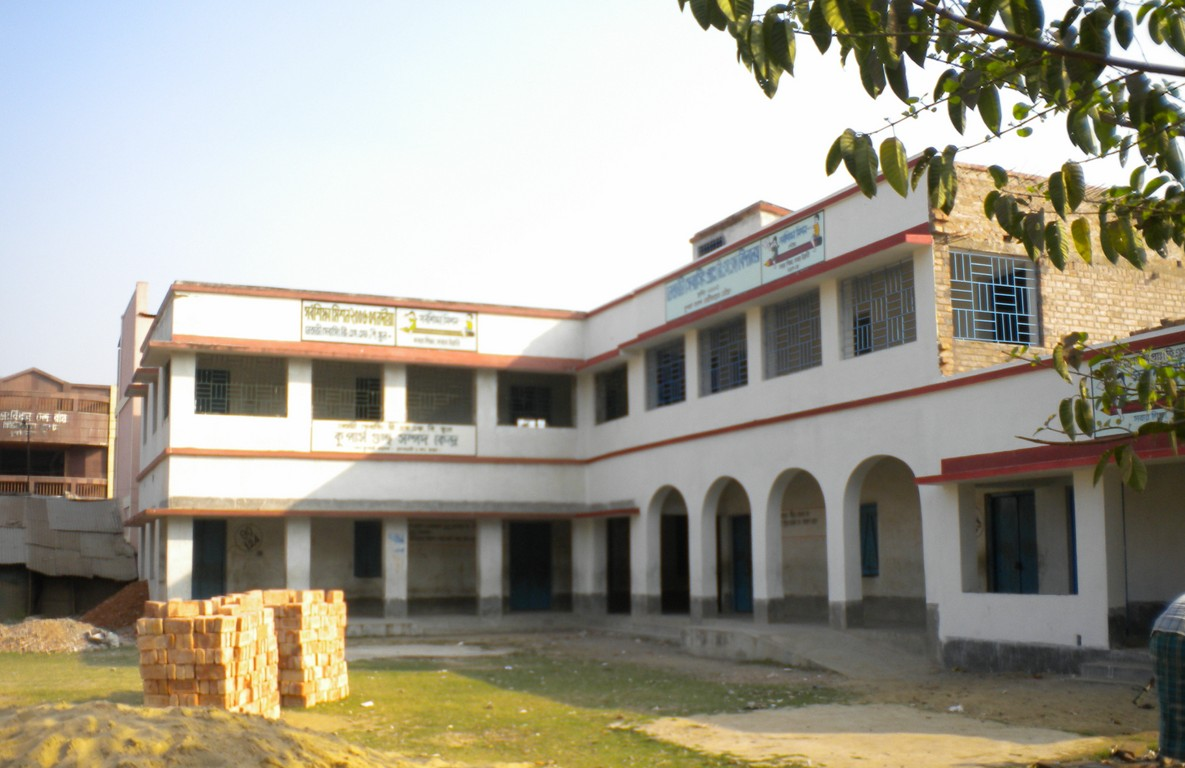
G.S.F. Primary School, Cooper's Camp

As per the 2011 Census of India, Cooper's Camp had a total population of 23,119, of which 11, 670 (50%) were males and 11,449 (50%) were females. Population below 6 years was 1,980. The total number of literates in Cooper's Camp was 18,220 (86.19% of the population over 6 years).

The following municipalities, notified area, outgrowths and census towns were part of Ranaghat Urban Agglomeration in 2011 census: Ranaghat (M), Birnagar (M), Cooper's Camp (NA), Magurkhali (OG), Ranaghat (CT) (CT), Hijuli (CT), Aistala (CT), Satigachha (CT), Nasra (CT), Panpara (CT), Raghabpur (CT), Kamgachhi (CT), Anulia (CT) and Halalpur Krishnapur (CT).

As of 2001 India census, Cooper's Camp had a population of 17,755. Males constitute 51% of the population and females 49%. Cooper's Camp has an average literacy rate of 65%, higher than the national average of 59.5%: male literacy is 73% and, female literacy is 58%. In Cooper's Camp, 11% of the population is under 6 years of age. In 1997 it became a notified area with 12 wards.
