= Ranaghat (CT) =

- Census Town
- Location in West Bengal, India Ranaghat (CT) (India)
- Coordinates: 23.177705°N 88.573553°E
- Country: India
- State: West Bengal
- District: Nadia

Area
  - Total: 2.94 km^{2} (1.14 sq mi)

Population (2011)
  - Total: 3,982
  - Density: 1,350/km^{2} (3,510/sq mi)

Languages
  - Official: Bengali, English
- Time zone: UTC+5:30 (IST)
- PIN: 741202
- Telephone/STD code: 03454
- Lok Sabha constituency: Ranaghat
- Vidhan Sabha constituency: Ranaghat Uttar Paschim
- Website: nadia.gov.in

Ranaghat (CT) is a census town in the Ranaghat II CD block in the Ranaghat subdivision of the Nadia district in the state of West Bengal, India.

== Geography ==
Cities and towns in Ranaghat subdivision of Nadia district
M: municipal town/ city/notified area, CT: census town, R: rural/ urban centre.
Owing to space constraints in the small map, the actual locations in a larger map may vary slightly

=== Location ===
Ranaghat (CT) is located at 23.177705°N 88.573553°E.

Ranaghat (CT) is not marked or identified in Google maps. The location is based on the Map of Ranaghat II CD block in the District Census Handbook 2011, Nadia.

The maps of Ranaghat I and Ranaghat II CD blocks, in the District Census Handbook 2011, Nadia, shows the census towns of Kamgachhi, Raghabpur, Panpara, Aistala, Satigachha, Anulia, Halalpur Krishnapur, Hijuli and Ranaghat (CT) forming a cluster around Ranaghat. Certain other localities such as Nokari, Nasra, Cooper's Camp, Birnagar, Habibpur, Gopalpur and Parbbatipur are also linked with this cluster.

=== Area overview ===
Nadia district is mostly alluvial plains lying to the east of Hooghly River, locally known as Bhagirathi. The alluvial plains are cut across by such distributaries as Jalangi, Churni and Ichhamati. With these rivers getting silted up, floods are a recurring feature. The Ranaghat subdivision has the Bhagirathi on the west, with Purba Bardhaman and Hooghly districts lying across the river. Topographically, Ranaghat subdivision is spread across the Krishnanagar-Santipur Plain, which occupies the central part of the district, and the Ranaghat-Chakdaha Plain, the low-lying area found in the south-eastern part of the district. The Churni separates the two plains. A portion of the east forms the boundary with Bangladesh. The lower portion of the east is covered by a portion of the North 24 Parganas district. The subdivision has achieved reasonably high urbanisation. 41.68% of the population lives in urban areas and 58.32% lives in rural areas.

Note: The map alongside presents some of the notable locations in the subdivision. All places marked in the map are linked in the larger full screen map. All the four subdivisions are presented with maps on the same scale – the size of the maps vary as per the area of the subdivision.

== Demographics ==
According to the 2011 Census of India, Ranaghat (CT) had a total population of 3,982, of which 1,985 (50%) were males and 1,997 (50%) were females. Population in the age range 0–6 years was 287. The total number of literate persons in Ranaghat (CT) was 3,273 (88.58% of the population over 6 years).

The following municipalities, notified area, outgrowths and census towns were part of Ranaghat Urban Agglomeration in 2011 census: Ranaghat (M), Birnagar (M), Cooper's Camp (NA), Magurkhali (OG), Ranaghat (CT) (CT), Hijuli (CT), Aistala (CT), Satigachha (CT), Nasra (CT), Panpara (CT), Raghabpur (CT), Kamgachhi (CT), Anulia (CT) and Halalpur Krishnapur (CT).

== Infrastructure ==
According to the District Census Handbook 2011, Nadia, Ranaghat (CT) covered an area of 2.94 km^{2}. Among the civic amenities, it had 18 km roads with both open and closed drains, the protected water supply involved overhead tank, tap water from untreated sources, hand pump. It had 1,315 domestic electric connections, 100 road light points. Among the medical facilities, it had 1 dispensary/ health centre, 3 medicine shops. Among the educational facilities it had 5 primary schools, 2 middle schools, 1 secondary school, the nearest senior secondary school at Ranaghat 3.5 km away. Three important commodities it produced were bakery products, garments, spinning mill products. It had branch office of 1 nationalised bank.

== Transport ==
Ranaghat Junction railway station, located nearby, is on the Sealdah-Ranaghat line of the Kolkata Suburban Railway system.
