= Parbbatipur =

- Census Town
- Location in West Bengal, India Parbbatipur (India)
- Coordinates: 23.1278°N 88.5441°E
- Country: India
- State: West Bengal
- District: Nadia
- Elevation: 1.93 m (6.3 ft)

Population (2011)
  - Total: 9,584

Languages
  - Official: Bengali, English
- Time zone: UTC+5:30 (IST)
- Vehicle registration: WB
- Website: wb.gov.in

Parbbatipur is a census town in Ranaghat I CD Block in Ranaghat subdivision of Nadia district in the Indian state of West Bengal.

== Geography ==
Cities and towns in Ranaghat subdivision of Nadia district
M: municipal town/ city/notified area, CT: census town, R: rural/ urban centre.
Owing to space constraints in the small map, the actual locations in a larger map may vary slightly

=== Location ===
Parbbatipur is not marked or identified in Google maps. The location shown here is based on the Map of Ranaghat I CD block in the District Census Handbook 2011, Nadia. Payradanga is not identified as a separate inhibited place in 2011 census. It is possibly spread across Ukhil Nara mouza and Parabbatipur census town.

The maps of Ranaghat I and Ranaghat II CD blocks, in the District Census Handbook 2011, Nadia, shows the census towns of Kamgachhi, Raghabpur, Panpara, Aistala, Satigachha, Anulia, Halalpur Krishnapur, Hijuli and Ranaghat (CT) forming a cluster around Ranaghat. Certain other localities such as Nokari, Nasra, Cooper's Camp, Birnagar, Habibpur, Gopalpur and Parbbatipur are also linked with this cluster.

Nadia district is mostly alluvial plains lying to the east of Hooghly River, locally known as Bhagirathi. The alluvial plains are cut across by such distributaries as Jalangi, Churni and Ichhamati. With these rivers getting silted up, floods are a recurring feature.

=== Area overview ===
Nadia district is mostly alluvial plains lying to the east of Hooghly River, locally known as Bhagirathi. The alluvial plains are cut across by such distributaries as Jalangi, Churni and Ichhamati. With these rivers getting silted up, floods are a recurring feature. The Ranaghat subdivision has the Bhagirathi on the west, with Purba Bardhaman and Hooghly districts lying across the river. Topographically, Ranaghat subdivision is spread across the Krishnanagar-Santipur Plain, which occupies the central part of the district, and the Ranaghat-Chakdaha Plain, the low-lying area found in the south-eastern part of the district. The Churni separates the two plains. A portion of the east forms the boundary with Bangladesh. The lower portion of the east is covered by a portion of the North 24 Parganas district. The subdivision has achieved reasonably high urbanisation. 41.68% of the population lives in urban areas and 58.32% lives in rural areas.

Note: The map alongside presents some of the notable locations in the subdivision. All places marked in the map are linked in the larger full screen map. All the four subdivisions are presented with maps on the same scale – the size of the maps vary as per the area of the subdivision.

== Demographics ==
As per the 2011 Census of India, Parbbatipur had a total population of 9,584, of which 4,855 (51%) were males and 4,729 (49%) were females. Population below 6 years was 699. The total number of literates in Parbattipur was 7,872 (88.60% of the population over 6 years).

The following municipality and census towns were part of Chakdaha Urban Agglomeration in 2011 census: Chakdaha (M), Parbbatipur (CT), Gopalpur (CT), Belgharia (CT), Punglia (CT) and Lalpur (P) (CT).

As of 2001 India census, Parbbatipur had a population of 7833. Males constitute 51% of the population and females 49%. Parbbatipur has an average literacy rate of 77%, higher than the national average of 59.5%: male literacy is 82%, and female literacy is 72%. In Parbbatipur, 9% of the population is under 6 years of age.

== Infrastructure ==
According to the District Census Handbook 2011, Nadia, Parbbatipur covered an area of 1.93 km^{2}. Among the civic amenities, it had 8.5 km roads with both open and closed drains, the protected water supply involved BWT, hand pump, tubewell, borewell. It had 2,206 domestic electric connections, 375 road light points. Among the medical facilities, the nearest dispensary/ health centre was 6 km away. Among the educational facilities it had 1 primary school, 1 middle school, 1 secondary school, 1 senior secondary school. It had 1 recognised short-hand typewriting and vocational training institute. Among the social, recreational and cultural facilities it had 2 public libraries, 2 reading rooms. It had branch office of 1 nationalised bank.

== Transport ==
Payradanga railway station, located in the area, is well connected by the local train transport system to the Sealdah-Ranaghat Line.

== Healthcare ==
Habibpur (Jadav Dutta) Rural Hospital, with 30 beds at Habibpur, is the major government medical facility in the Ranaghat I CD block.
