= Birnagar =

Town in West Bengal, India

- City
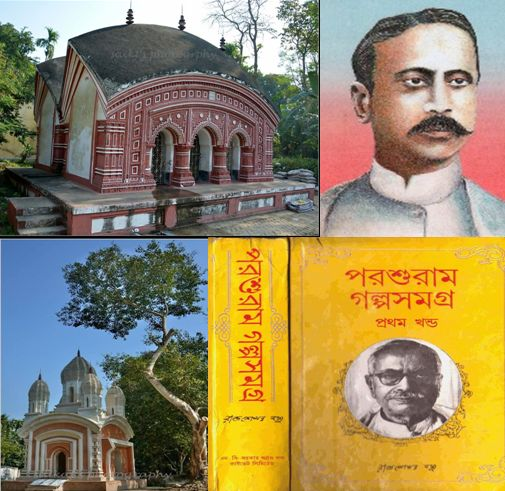
- Temples in Birnagar, Rajshekhar Basu (bottom right) & Nabin Chandra Sen (right)

- Location in West Bengal, India Birnagar (India)
- Coordinates: 23.2433°N 88.5582°E
- Country: India
- State: West Bengal
- District: Nadia

Government
  - Type: Municipality
  - Body: Birnagar Municipality

Area
  - Total: 6 km^{2} (2.3 sq mi)
- Elevation: 13 m (43 ft)

Population (2011)
  - Total: 32,799
  - Density: 5,500/km^{2} (14,000/sq mi)

Languages
  - Official: Bengali, English
- Time zone: UTC+5:30 (IST)
- Postal code: 741127
- Lok Sabha constituency: Ranaghat
- Vidhan Sabha constituency: Ranaghat Uttar Paschim
- Website: www.birnagarmunicipality.org

Birnagar (formerly known as Ula) is an island town situated in the Hooghly River, within the Ranaghat subdivision of Nadia district in West Bengal, India. It traces its origins back to the pre-colonial era when it was established. Prior to the British colonization of India, Birnagar was known as "Ula."

The Birnagar railway station is located 81 kilometers north of Kolkata within the Sealdah railway division.

Birnagar is the oldest municipality in Nadia district, consisting of 14 wards. The first chairman of Birnagar was the renowned poet Nabinchandra Sen.

== History ==
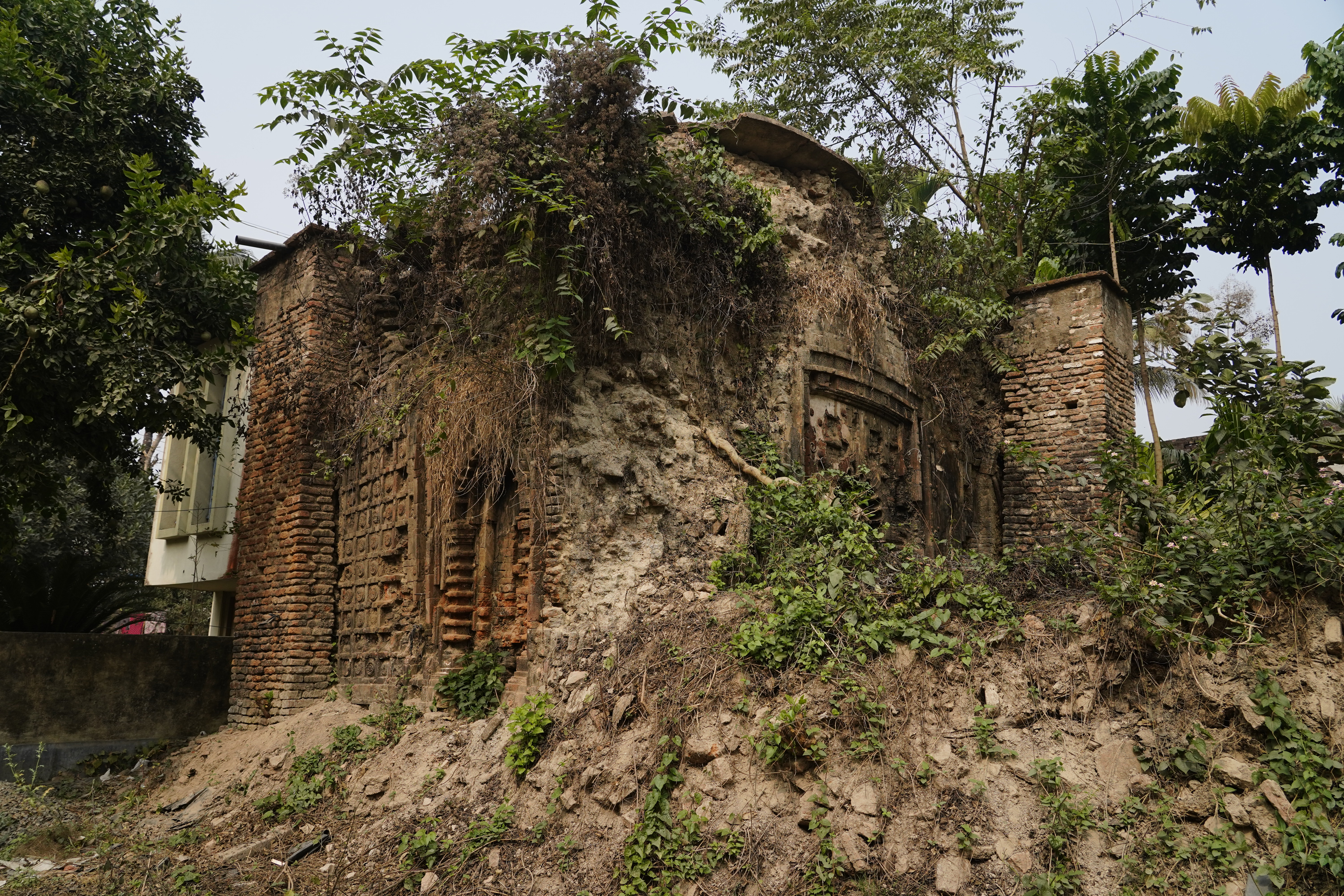
The oldest temple found at Ula is the Vishnu temple located to the north-east of the Mitra-Mustafi house.

According to historical records, Birnagar was initially an island in the Hoogly River, but its course shifted away from the then settlement of Ula around 1707. Before British colonization, the area was referred to as Ula or Ulo. The name "Ula" still persists in the titles of some local institutions, such as the library and hospital, and is also mentioned in Rabindranath Tagore's short story Post Master. The Birnagar Municipality has a history of around 150 years, with its inaugural chairman being Kabi Nabinchandra Sen. In the past, Birnagar was divided between two zamindars: the Mukherjees and the Mustafis.

== Geography ==
Cities and towns in Ranaghat subdivision of Nadia district
M: municipal town/ city/notified area, CT: census town, R: rural/ urban centre.
Owing to space constraints in the small map, the actual locations in a larger map may vary slightly

=== Location ===
Birnagar is situated at coordinates 23.2433°N 88.5582°E.

According to the maps in the District Census Handbook 2011 for Nadia, the census towns of Kamgachhi, Raghabpur, Panpara, Aistala, Satigachha, Anulia, Halalpur Krishnapur, Hijuli, and Ranaghat (CT) form a cluster around Ranaghat within the Ranaghat I and Ranaghat II CD blocks. Additionally, other localities such as Nokari, Nasra, Cooper's Camp, Birnagar, Habibpur, Gopalpur, and Parbbatipur are also associated with this cluster.

=== Area overview ===
Nadia district consists mainly of alluvial plains located to the east of the Hooghly River, locally known as Bhagirathi. These plains are intersected by distributaries such as Jalangi, Churni, and Ichhamati. Due to the siltation of these rivers, floods occur periodically. The Ranaghat subdivision is bordered by the Bhagirathi River to the west, with Purba Bardhaman and Hooghly districts situated on the opposite bank. Topographically, the Ranaghat subdivision encompasses the Krishnanagar-Santipur Plain, which occupies the central part of the district, and the Ranaghat-Chakdaha Plain, a low-lying area in the southeastern part. The Churni River separates these two plains. A portion of the eastern border forms the boundary with Bangladesh, while the lower section is part of the North 24 Parganas district. The subdivision has experienced significant urbanization, with 41.68% of the population residing in urban areas and 58.32% living in rural areas.

Note: The map alongside presents some of the notable locations in the subdivision. All places marked in the map are linked in the larger full screen map. All the four subdivisions are presented with maps on the same scale – the size of the maps vary as per the area of the subdivision.

== Demographics ==
Religion in Birnagar
Birnagar	Percent
Hindu	98.32%
Muslim	1.51%
Christian	0.09%
Buddhist	0.01%
Not stated	0.06%

According to the 2021 Indian census, Birnagar has a population of 41,200, comprising 16,658 males and 16,141 females, as reported by Census India in 2011.

In Birnagar (M), a significant portion of the population belongs to the Schedule Caste (SC), comprising 35.40%, while Schedule Tribe (ST) members constitute 0.65% of the total population. The child sex ratio in Birnagar is approximately 943, compared to the West Bengal state average of 956.

In the 2011 census, the following municipalities, notified areas, outgrowths, and census towns were part of the Ranaghat Urban Agglomeration:Ranaghat (M), Birnagar (M), Cooper's Camp (NA), Magurkhali (OG), Ranaghat (CT) (CT), Hijuli (CT), Aistala (CT), Satigachha (CT), Nasra (CT), Panpara (CT), Raghabpur (CT), Kamgachhi (CT), Anulia (CT) and Halalpur Krishnapur (CT).

== Education ==
The town features several primary and high schools, along with institutions offering higher education.

Higher-secondary schools

- Birnagar High School (Uttar Para)
- Shivkali Girls' High school (Library Para)

Primary schools

- Birnagar High Attached GSFP School

1 NCPL

Other schools

- Ramkrishna Ashramic primary (Bengali Medium) (Khan para)
- Gunedranath Public School (English medium) (Library Para)
- Chatterji Noble School (English Medium) (Kharda Para)

College

- Birnagar Kabinabin Chandra Sen Teachers Training Institute

Other institutions

- In addition to numerous computer centers, the town is home to various non-governmental organizations (NGOs). One such organization, YOURS (Ula Youth Organization For Reformation Service), organizes programs such as MDP, ESDP, and IMC focusing on various technical skills. Additionally, there are several dance and drawing schools available in the area.

Computer training institutes

- BCTI (Birnagar Computer Training Institute, W.B. Govt. Regd. Computer Training Institute, Estd: 2007) Birnagar, Hat, near Birnagar Municipality Market Complex
- Edutech Academy (Rashtriya Youth Computer Saksharata Mission # ISO 9001:2015 Certified # Govt. Of India Affiliated @ RYCSM) Palitpara Bazar, Birnagar, Nadia

The literacy rate of Birnagar city stands at 84.60%, surpassing the state average of 76.26%. In Birnagar, the male literacy rate is approximately 88.26%, while the female literacy rate is 80.82%.

== Library ==
Ula Sadharon Pathagar was founded in 1922, located in Library Para near Shivkali Girl's Higher Secondary School. Membership is open to individuals over 18 years of age, allowing them to borrow one book at a time for a duration of one month.

Library statistics

- Total books - 12000
- Magazines - 13
- Rare books - 63
- Registered members - 856

== Birnagar Municipality ==
Established over 200 years ago, Birnagar municipality holds the distinction of being the oldest municipality in the Nadia district. Notably, the first chairman of Birnagar municipality was the esteemed poet Nabinchandra Sen. The municipality comprises 14 wards. Birnagar Municipality oversees the administration of 6,702 households, providing essential services such as water and sewerage. Additionally, it possesses the authority to construct roads within the municipality's boundaries and levy taxes on properties falling within its jurisdiction.

== Notable people ==
- Bhaktivinoda Thakur (born Kedarnath Datta)
- Nabinchandra Sen
- Rajsekhar Bose or Parasuram
