= Alokesh Das =

Indian politician (born 1964)

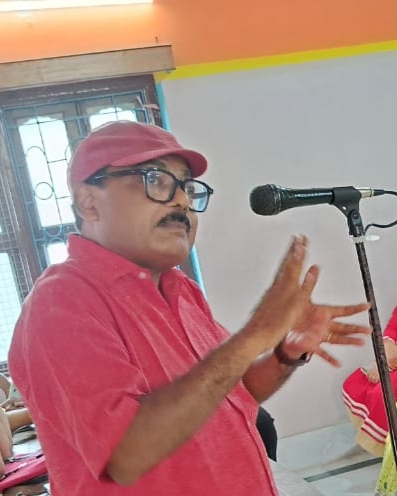

Member of the Indian Parliament for Nabadwip
- In office 2003–2009
- Preceded by: Ananda Mohan Biswas
- Succeeded by: constituency abolished

Personal details
- Born: 1 January 1964 (age 62) Nadia, West Bengal
- Party: CPI(M)
- Spouse: Sikta Joarder Das
- Children: 1 daughter Alakta Das
- Parent: Shyam Charan Das (father)
- As of 11 April, 2024

Alokesh Das (born 1 January 1964) was a member of the 14th Lok Sabha of India. He represented the Nabadwip constituency of West Bengal from 2003 to 2009 and is a member of the Communist Party of India (Marxist).

== Early life ==
Das was born in Ranaghat in 1964. His father's name was Shyam Chandra Das. He passed B.Sc. (Honours) from Kalyani University. Das worked as a school teacher prior to enter in politics.

== Political career ==
A by-election was held in 2003 when Nabadwip Lok Sabha MP Ananda Mohan Biswas died. Alokesh Das contested as a CPIM candidate in that by-election and defeated Trinamool candidate Abir Ranjan Biswas.

== Electoral history ==
=== General Election 2024 ===
2024 Indian general election: Ranaghat
Party	Candidate	Votes	%	±%
BJP	Jagannath Sarkar	782,396	50.78	▼2
AITC	Mukut Mani Adhikari	595,497	39.65	▲1.6
CPI(M)	Alakesh Das	123,810	8.04	▲1.45
SUCI(C)	Paresh Halder	8239	0.53	New
NOTA	None of the above			
Majority				
Turnout				
gain from		Swing		

=== 2021 ===
West Bengal assembly elections, 2021: Haringhata (SC) constituency
Party	Candidate	Votes	%	±%
BJP	Asim Kumar Sarkar	97,666	46.31	
AITC	Nilima Nag (Mallick)	82,466	39.11	
CPI(M)	Alakesh Das	24,800	11.76	
Turnout				
BJP gain from AITC		Swing		

=== 2019 ===
2019 Indian general election: Bangaon
Party	Candidate	Votes	%	±%
BJP	Shantanu Thakur	687,622	48.85	+24.68
AITC	Mamata Thakur	5,76,028	40.92	−2.35
CPI(M)	Alakesh Das	90,122	6.40	−19.9
INC	Sourav Prasad	22,618	1.61	−0.72
Independent	Animesh Chandra Halder	9,522	0.68	
BSP	Chandan Mallick	4,707	0.33	
SUCI(C)	Swapan Mondal	4,544	0.32	
PDS	Samaresh Biswas	1,913	0.14	
Independent	Swapan Kumar Roy	1,859	0.13	
BMP	Subrata Biswas	1,291	0.09	
NOTA	None of the above	7,512	0.53	
Majority		1,11,594	11.42	
Turnout		14,08,653	82.64	
Registered electors		17,04,632		
BJP gain from AITC		Swing		

=== 2004 ===
2004 Indian general elections: Nabadwip constituency
Party	Candidate	Votes	%	±%
CPI(M)	Alakesh Das	560,176	47.56	
AITC	Nilima Nag (Mallick)	550,185	46.71	
INC	Nripendra Nath Howladar	24,268	5.70	
BSP	Satish Biswas	15,719	0.92	
Independent	Basudeb Bacchar	11,139	0.83	
Independent	Parimal Dhali	8,318	0.54	
Independent	Gopal Biswas	3,710	0.54	
Independent	Paramesh Chandra Biswas	2,219	0.54	
Independent	Amitosh Biswas	2,037	0.54	
Majority		9,991	2.09	
Turnout		12,48,360	80.49	
CPI(M) hold		Swing		

=== Bye election 2003 ===
Indian Parliamentary bye election, 2003: Nabadwip constituency
Party	Candidate	Votes	%	±%
CPI(M)	Alakesh Das	520,630	48.13	
AITC	Abir Ranjan Biswas	421,830	39.29	
INC	Rajani Kanta Dolai	137,319	12.40	
Majority		98,800		
Turnout		11,07,919	81.6	
CPI(M) gain from AITC		Swing	{{{swing}}}	
