= Mukut Mani Adhikari =

Indian politician

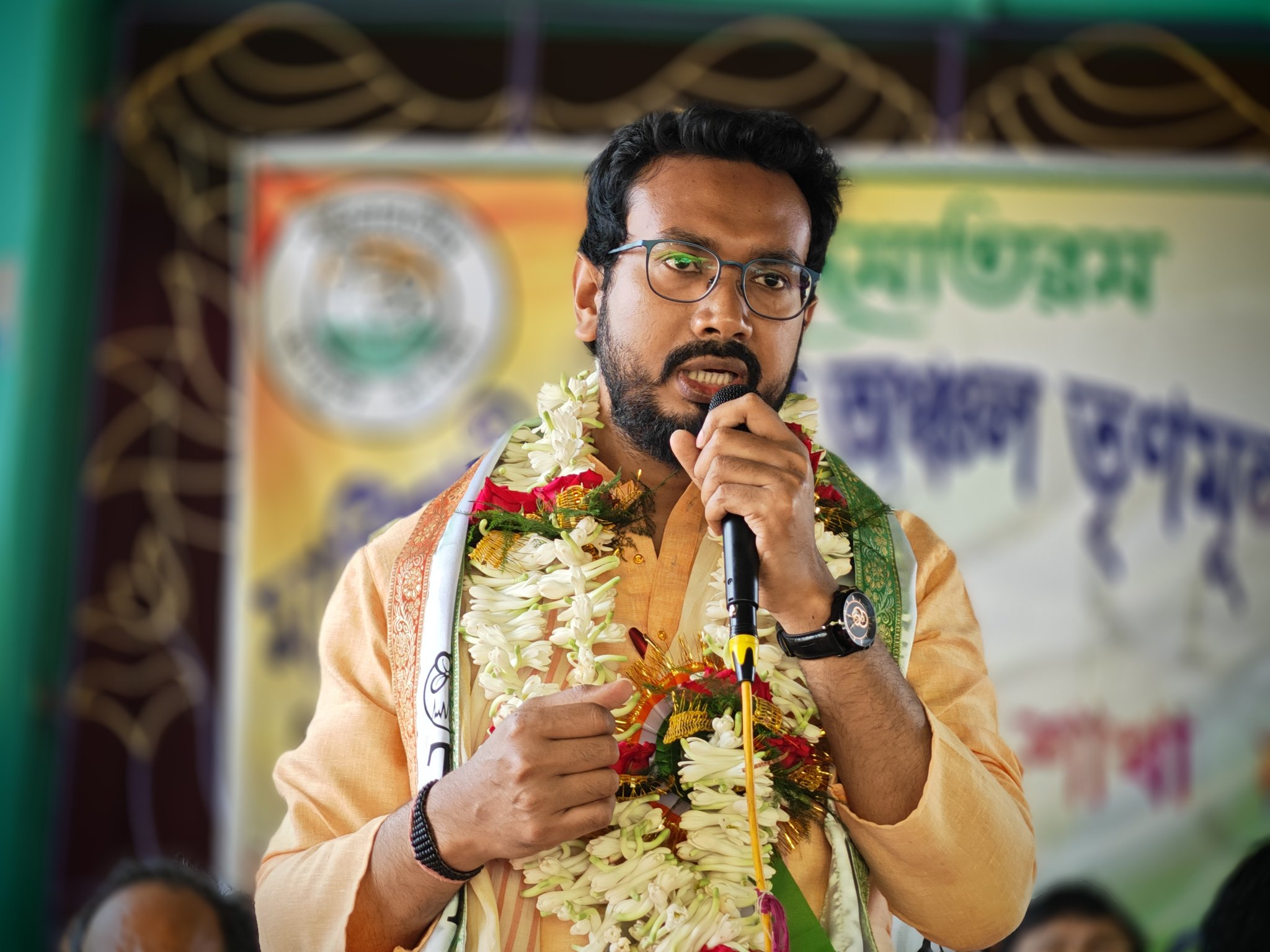
- Vote Campaign TMC candidate Mukut Mani Adhikari contesting Ranaghat Lok Sabha constituency 2024

Member of the West Bengal Legislative Assembly
- In office 2 May 2021 – 4 May 2026
- Preceded by: Rama Biswas
- Succeeded by: Ashim Kumar Biswas
- Constituency: Ranaghat Dakshin

Personal details
- Born: Majhdia, Krishnaganj, Nadia 741507
- Party: All India Trinamool Congress
- Other political affiliations: Bharatiya Janata Party
- Spouse: Not applicable
- Education: MBBS
- Alma mater: West Bengal University of Health Sciences
- Profession: Doctor, Social Worker and Politician

Mukut Mani Adhikari is an Indian politician. He is a poster boy of Matua Mahasangha. He was a MLA candidate for BJP at Ranaghat Dakshin contesting 2021 West Bengal Legislative Assembly election. In May 2021, he was elected as a member of the West Bengal Legislative Assembly from Ranaghat Dakshin (constituency). He defeated Barnali Dey Roy of All India Trinamool Congress by 16,515 votes in 2021 West Bengal Assembly election. He joined the TMC on 7 March 2024. He was again elected from the same constituency in the bypoll.
