= Asim Bala =

Indian politician

Member of Parliament, Lok Sabha
- In office 1989–1999
- Preceded by: Bibha Ghosh Goswami
- Succeeded by: Ananda Mohan Biswas
- Constituency: Nabadwip West Bengal

Member of West Bengal Legislative Assembly
- In office 2001–2006
- Preceded by: Binay Krishna Biswas
- Succeeded by: Debendra Nath Biswas
- Constituency: Ranaghat East

Personal details
- Born: 30 October 1941 (age 84) Calcutta, Bengal Presidency, British India
- Party: Communist Party of India (Marxist)

Asim Bala is an Indian politician. He was elected to the Lok Sabha, the lower house of the Parliament of India from the Nabadwip in West Bengal as a member of the Communist Party of India (Marxist).
