= Taraknagar =

- Village
- Interactive map of Taraknagar
- Coordinates: 23°22′47″N 88°40′47″E
- Country: India
- State: West Bengal
- District: Nadia

Area
  - Total: 3.39 km^{2} (1.31 sq mi)
- Elevation: 6 m (20 ft)

Languages
  - Official: Bengali, English
- Time zone: UTC+5:30 (IST)
- PIN: 741502
- Telephone code: 03473
- Vehicle registration: WB-52
- Coastline: 0 kilometres (0 mi)
- Nearest Town: Bagula
- Sex ratio: 1.07 ♂/♀
- Lok Sabha constituency: Ranaghat

Taraknagar is a village in the Krishnaganj CD block in the Krishnanagar Sadar subdivision of the Nadia district, West Bengal, India situated 99 km north of Kolkata. Taraknagar is well connected with the state capital Kolkata via Kolkata Suburban Railway.

== Location ==
Taraknagar is 99 km north of Kolkata (Calcutta) at 23.38°N 88.68°E. The village is located around less than 10 km from Bangladesh–India border.

== Education ==
Taraknagar has few primary schools and two Govt. sponsored high schools:

- Taraknagar Maa Maharani High School
- Taraknagar Jamuna Sundari High School.
- Sukantapally Primary School
- Raj palash High school

== Transport ==
Several local trains pass through the Taraknagar railway station situated in Ranaghat - Gede Branch line of Sealdah railway division.

== Politics ==
Taraknagar is situated under Krishnaganj (Vidhan Sabha constituency) and Ranaghat (Lok Sabha constituency). The village falls under Shibnivas Gram Panchayat.

== Administration ==
Krishnanagar is the district headquarter for Shibnivas Gram Panchayat. The Village is Under Krishnanagar Sadar subdivision of Nadia District.
