= Santipur (community development block) =

- Community development block
- Coordinates: 23.231°N 88.495°E
- Country: India
- State: West Bengal
- District: Nadia

Government
  - Type: Community development block

Area
  - Total: 171.41 km^{2} (66.18 sq mi)
- Elevation: 13 m (43 ft)

Population (2001)
  - Total: 355,524
  - Density: 2,074.1/km^{2} (5,371.9/sq mi)

Languages
  - Official: Bengali, English

Literacy (2011)
  - Total literates: 158,274 (73.10%)
- Time zone: UTC+5:30 (IST)
- PIN: 741402 (Fulia Colony); 741234 (Gayeshpur)
- Telephone/STD code: 03473
- Vehicle registration: WB-51, WB-52
- Lok Sabha constituency: Ranaghat
- Vidhan Sabha constituency: Santipur, Ranaghat Uttar Paschim
- Website: nadia.nic.in

Santipur is a community development block that forms an administrative division in Ranaghat subdivision of Nadia district in the Indian state of West Bengal.

== Geography ==
Santipur CD Block is bounded by Nabadwip and Krishnanagar I CD Blocks in the north, Ranaghat I CD Block in the east, Balagarh CD Block in Hooghly district, across the Hooghly River, in the south, and Kalna I and Kalna II CD Blocks in Bardhaman district, across the Hooghly River, in the west.

Nadia district is mostly alluvial plains lying to the east of Hooghly River, locally known as Bhagirathi. The alluvial plains are cut across by such distributaries as Jalangi, Churni and Ichhamati. With these rivers getting silted up, floods are a recurring feature.

Santipur CD Block has an area of 171.41 km^{2}. It has 1 panchayat samity, 10 gram panchayats, 172 gram sansads (village councils), 69 mouzas and 54 inhabited villages. Shantipur police station serves this block. Headquarters of this CD Block is at Phulia.

It is located 21 km from Krishnanagar, the district headquarters.

Gram panchayats of Santipur block/ panchayat samiti are: Arbandi I, Arbandi II, Babla, Baganchra, Belgoria I, Belgoria II, Fulia Township, Gayeshpur, Haripur and Nabla.

== Demographics ==
=== Population ===
As per the 2011 Census of India, Santipur CD Block had a total population of 241,080, of which 154,256 were rural and 86,824 were urban. There were 124,400 (52%) males and 116,680 (48%) females. The population below 6 years was 24,576. Scheduled Castes numbered 99,539 (41.29%) and Scheduled Tribes numbered 3,189 (1.32%).

As per the 2001 census, Santipur block had a total population of 217,289, out of which 111,707 were males and 105,582 were females. Santipur block registered a population growth of 29.42 per cent during the 1991-2001 decade. Decadal growth for the district was 19.51 per cent. Decadal growth in West Bengal was 17.84 per cent.

There are several census towns in Santipur CD Block (2011 census figures in brackets): Nrisinghapur (11,336), Harinadibhastsala (4,983), Ghoralia (5,268), Beharia (9,584) and Phulia (55,653).

Large villages (with 4,000+ population) in Santipur CD Block are (2011 census figures in brackets): Gayespur (5,247), Panpara (5,156), Saguna (7,874), Hijuli (4,146), Baganchara (8,524), Charharipur (5,882), Bankdebipur (P) (4,054), Haripur (4,227), Gobindapur (16,632), Bagdia (4,922), Chandra (5,287), Boalia (6,589) and Goalpur (4,958).

Other villages in Santipur CD Block include (2011 census figures in brackets): Arbandi (2,173) and Nabla (1,890).

=== Literacy ===
As per the 2011 census, the total number of literates in Santipur CD Block was 158,274 (73.10% of the population over 6 years) out of which males numbered 87,477 (78.23% of the male population over 6 years) and females numbered 70,797 (67.63% of the female population over 6 years). The gender disparity (the difference between female and male literacy rates) was 10.61%.

See also – List of West Bengal districts ranked by literacy rate

Literacy in CD blocks of
Nadia district
Tehatta subdivision
Karimpur I – 67.70%
Karimpur II – 62.04%
Tehatta I – 70.72%
Tehatta II – 68.52%
Krishnanagar Sadar subdivision
Kaliganj – 65.89%
Nakashipara – 64.86%
Chapra – 68.25%
Krishnanagar I – 71.45%
Krishnanagar II – 68.52%
Nabadwip – 67.72%
Krishnaganj – 72.86%
Ranaghat subdivision
Hanskhali – 80.11%
Santipur – 73.10%
Ranaghat I – 77.61%
Ranaghat II – 79.38%
Kalyani subdivision
Chakdaha – 64.17%
Haringhata – 82.15%
Source: 2011 Census: CD Block Wise
Primary Census Abstract Data

=== Language and religion ===
Religion in Santipur CD block (2011)
Hinduism	86.45%
Islam	11.85%
Tribal religion	1.34%
Other or not stated	0.36%

In the 2011 census, Hindus numbered 208,410 and formed 86.45% of the population in Santipur CD Block. Muslims numbered 28,573 and formed 11.85% of the population. Christians numbered 623 and formed 0.26% of the population. Others numbered 3,474 and formed 1.44% of the population.

In the 2001 census, Hindus numbered 193,062 and formed 88.84% of the population of Santipur CD Block. Muslims numbered 23,594 and formed 10.85% of the population. In the 1991 census, Hindus numbered 148,766 and formed 88.61% of the population of Santipur CD Block. Muslims numbered 18,608 and formed 11.08% of the population.

Languages in Santipur CD block (2011)
1. Bengali (97.7%)
2. Sadri (1.66%)
3. Others (0.65%)

At the time of the 2011 census, 97.69% of the population spoke Bengali and 1.66% Sadri as their first language.

== Rural poverty ==
The District Human Development Report for Nadia has provided a CD Block-wise data table for Modified Human Vulnerability Index of the district. Santipur CD Block registered 38.64 on the MHPI scale. The CD Block-wise mean MHVI was estimated at 33.92. A total of 8 out of the 17 CD Blocks in Nadia district were found to be severely deprived when measured against the CD Block mean MHVI - Karimpur I and Karimpur II (under Tehatta subdivision), Kaliganj, Nakashipara, Chapra, Krishnanagar I and Nabadwip (under Krishnanagar Sadar subdivision) and Santipur (under Ranaghat subdivision) appear to be backward.

As per the Human Development Report 2004 for West Bengal, the rural poverty ratio in Nadia district was 28.35%. The estimate was based on Central Sample data of NSS 55th round 1999–2000.

== Economy ==
=== Livelihood ===
In Santipur CD Block in 2011, amongst the class of total workers, cultivators formed 10.30%, agricultural labourers 21.22, household industry workers 34.95% and other workers 33.53%.

The southern part of Nadia district starting from Krishnanagar I down to Chakdaha and Haringhata has some urban pockets specialising in either manufacturing or service related economic activity and has reflected a comparatively higher concentration of population but the urban population has generally stagnated. Nadia district still has a large chunk of people living in the rural areas.

=== Infrastructure ===
There are 54 inhabited villages in Santipur CD Block. 100% villages have power supply and drinking water supply. 12 Villages (22.22%) have post offices. 51 villages (94.44%) have telephones (including landlines, public call offices and mobile phones). 27 villages (50.00%) have a pucca approach road and 17 villages (31.48%) have transport communication (includes bus service, rail facility and navigable waterways). 11 villages (20.37%) have agricultural credit societies and 9 villages (16.67%) have banks. Although 100% villages in Nadia district had power supply in 2011, a survey in 2007-08 revealed that less than 50% of households had electricity connection. In rural areas of the country, the tube well was for many years considered to be the provider of safe drinking water, but with arsenic contamination of ground water claiming public attention it is no longer so. Piped water supply is still a distant dream. In 2007–08, the availability of piped drinking water in Nadia district was as low as 8.6%, well below the state average of around 20%.

=== Agriculture ===
Persons engaged in agriculture
in Santipur CD Block
1. Bargadars (6.37%)
2. Patta holders (11.3%)
3. Small farmers (5.68%)
4. Marginal farmers (36.5%)
5. Agricultural labourers (40.2%)

Although the Bargadari Act of 1950 recognised the rights of bargadars to a higher share of crops from the land that they tilled, it was not implemented fully. Large tracts, beyond the prescribed limit of land ceiling, remained with the rich landlords. From 1977 onwards major land reforms took place in West Bengal. Land in excess of land ceiling was acquired and distributed amongst the peasants. Following land reforms land ownership pattern has undergone transformation. In 2013–14, persons engaged in agriculture in Santipur CD Block could be classified as follows: bargadars 6.37%, patta (document) holders 11.26%, small farmers (possessing land between 1 and 2 hectares) 5.68%, marginal farmers (possessing land up to 1 hectare) 36.50% and agricultural labourers 40.19%. As the proportion of agricultural labourers is very high, the real wage in the agricultural sector has been a matter of concern.

Santipur CD Block had 85 fertiliser depots, 3 seed stores and 79 fair price shops in 2013–14.

In 2013–14, Santipur CD Block produced 12,752 tonnes of Aman paddy, the main winter crop from 4,672 hectares, 13,004 tonnes of Boro paddy (spring crop) from 3,934 hectares, 7,272 tonnes of Aus paddy (summer crop) from 3,398 hectares, 4,481 tonnes of wheat from 1,435 hectares, 18 tonnes of maize from 7 hectares, 62,491 tonnes of jute from 3,913 hectares and 3,392 tonnes of potatoes from 106 hectares. It also produced pulses and oilseeds.

In 2013–14, the total area irrigated in Santipur CD Block was 1,755 hectares, out of which 255 hectares were irrigated by river lift irrigation, 1,390 hectares by deep tube wells and 110 hectares by shallow tube wells.

=== Weaving ===
With the partition of India many skilled weavers from Dhaka settled around Santipur in Nadia district and Ambika Kalna in Bardhaman district, both with long traditions in weaving and the entire weaving belt spread across Santipur, Phulia, Samudragarh, Dhatrigram and Ambika Kalna, produces quality handloom products in exotic designs and colours.

=== Banking ===
In 2013–14, Santipur CD Block had offices of 7 commercial banks and 5 gramin banks.

== Transport ==
Santipur CD Block has 4 ferry services and 10 originating/ terminating bus services.

There is an electrified broad gauge service between Ranaghat and Santipur and as of 2017, gauge conversion work is on in the Santipur-Nabadwip Dham sector from 2014.

The historic narrow gauge lines in the area have been closed down.

NH 12 (old number NH 34) passes through this block.

== Education ==
In 2013–14, Santipur CD Block had 117 primary schools with 10,542 students, 9 middle schools with 717 students, 5 high schools with 5,046 students and 9 higher secondary schools with 19,237 students. Santipur CD Block had 3 technical/ professional institutes with 226 students and 483 institutions for special and non-formal education with 17,694 students

In Santipur CD Block, amongst the 54 inhabited villages, 3 villages did not have any school, 30 had more than 1 primary school and 21 had at least 1 primary and 1 middle school and 9 had 1 middle and 1 secondary school.

== Healthcare ==
In 2014, Santipur CD Block had 4 primary health centres and 1 private nursing home with total 20 beds and 6 doctors (excluding private bodies). It had 24 family welfare subcentres. 676 patients were treated indoor and 158,858 patients were treated outdoor in the hospitals, health centres and subcentres of the CD Block.

Nabla (Fulia) Block Primary Health Centre, with 10 beds at Fulia Colony, is the major government medical facility in the Santipur CD block. There are primary health centres at Arbandhi (with 10 beds), Baganchora (with 10 beds) and Gayeshpur (with 10 beds).

Santipur State General Hospital at Santipur functions with 131 beds.

Santipur CD Block is one of the areas of Nadia district where ground water is affected by high level of arsenic contamination. The WHO guideline for arsenic in drinking water is 10 mg/ litre, and the Indian Standard value is 50 mg/ litre. All the 17 blocks of Nadia district have arsenic contamination above this level. The maximum concentration in Santipur CD Block is 524 mg/litre.

== Media ==
Nadiar Pratinidhi weekly newspaper in Bengali published from Fulia, edited by Bikash Biswas.
