= Nabadwip Lok Sabha constituency =

Former constituency of the Indian parliament in West Bengal

Coordinates: 23°25′N 88°22′E

Nabadwip
- Former Lok Sabha constituency

Constituency details
- Country: India
- Region: East India
- State: West Bengal
- Assembly constituencies: As of 2004: Nabadwip; Shantipur; Hanskhali (SC); Ranaghat East (SC); Ranaghat West; Chakdaha; Haringhata
- Established: 1951
- Abolished: 2009
- Reservation: SC

Nabadwip Lok Sabha constituency was one of the 543 parliamentary constituencies of India. This constituency was in the state of West Bengal. This constituency was reserved for Scheduled castes over certain periods.

== Assembly segments ==
In 2004, Nabadwip Lok Sabha constituency was composed of the following assembly segments:

- Nabadwip (assembly constituency no. 77)
- Shantipur (assembly constituency no. 78)
- Hanskhali (SC) (assembly constituency no. 79)
- Ranaghat East (SC) (assembly constituency no. 80)
- Ranaghat West (assembly constituency no. 81)
- Chakdaha (assembly constituency no. 82)
- Haringhata (assembly constituency no. 83)

As a consequence of the order of the Delimitation Commission in respect of the delimitation of constituencies in the West Bengal, Nabadwip parliamentary constituency ceased to exist from 2009; most of the assembly segments of this constituency are part of new Ranaghat Lok Sabha constituency.

== Members of Parliament ==
Lok Sabha	Duration	Constituency	Name of M.P.	Party affiliation
First	1952-57		Lakshmi Kanta Maitra	Indian National Congress
Second	1957-62		Ila Pal Choudhury	Indian National Congress
Third	1962-67		Haripada Chattopadhyay	Independent
Fourth	1967-71		P.R.Thakur	Bangla Congress
Fifth	1971-77		Bibha Ghosh	Communist Party of India (Marxist)
Sixth	1977-80		Bibha Ghosh (Goswami)	Communist Party of India (Marxist)
Seventh	1980-84		Bibha Ghosh (Goswami)	Communist Party of India (Marxist)
Eighth	1984-89		Bibha Ghosh (Goswami)	Communist Party of India (Marxist)
Ninth	1989-91		Asim Bala	Communist Party of India (Marxist)
Tenth	1991-96		Asim Bala	Communist Party of India (Marxist)
Eleventh	1996-98		Asim Bala	Communist Party of India (Marxist)
Twelfth	1998-99		Asim Bala	Communist Party of India (Marxist)
Thirteenth	1999-04		Ananda Mohan Biswas	Trinamool Congress
By election, 2003	2003-04		Alakesh Das	Communist Party of India (Marxist)
Fourteenth	2004-09		Alakesh Das	Communist Party of India (Marxist)

For MPs from this area in subsequent years see Ranaghat Lok Sabha constituency.

== Election results ==
=== 2004 ===
2004 Indian general elections: Nabadwip constituency
Party	Candidate	Votes	%	±%
CPI(M)	Alakesh Das	560,176	47.56	
AITC	Nilima Nag (Mallick)	550,185	46.71	
INC	Nripendra Nath Howladar	24,268	5.70	
BSP	Satish Biswas	15,719	0.92	
Independent	Basudeb Bacchar	11,139	0.83	
Independent	Parimal Dhali	8,318	0.54	
Independent	Gopal Biswas	3,710	0.54	
Independent	Paramesh Chandra Biswas	2,219	0.54	
Independent	Amitosh Biswas	2,037	0.54	
Majority		9,991	2.09	
Turnout		12,48,360	80.49	
CPI(M) hold		Swing		

=== Bye election 2003 ===
The Bye election occurred on 5 June 2003 due to death of sitting MP Ananda Mohan Biswas on 3 February 2003. Alakesh Das of CPI(M) Defeated Abir Ranjan Biswas of Trinamool Congress, the son of Ananda Mohan Biswas.

Indian Parliamentary bye election, 2003: Nabadwip constituency
Party	Candidate	Votes	%	±%
CPI(M)	Alakesh Das	520,630	48.13	
AITC	Abir Ranjan Biswas	421,830	39.29	
INC	Rajani Kanta Dolai	137,319	12.40	
Majority		98,800		
Turnout		11,07,919	81.6	
CPI(M) gain from AITC		Swing	{{{swing}}}	

=== General elections 1951-2004 ===
In 1951, there were two constituencies = Santipur and Nabadwip. From 1957 it was Nabadwip only. Most of the contests were multi-cornered. However, only winners and runners-up are mentioned below:

Year	Voters	Voter turnout	Winner			Runners up		
		%age	Candidate	%age	Party	Candidate	%age	Party
1951 (Santipur)	160,938	43.33	Arun Chandra Guha	49.98	INC	Bimal Kumar Chatterjee	16.31	RCPI
1951(Nabadwip)	159025	41.65	Lakshmi Kanta Maitra	57.52	INC	Kumaresh Chandra	32.66	Independent
1957	219,064	53.53	Ila Pal Choudhury	61.21	INC	Kumaresh Chandra	38.79	Independent
1962	301,179	54.96	Haripada Chattopadhyay	52.56	Independent	Ila Pal Choudhuri	47.74	INC
1967	364,599	72.36	P.R.Thakur	61.24	Bangla Congress	J.C.Biswas	38.76	INC
1971	391,659	68	Bibha Ghosh	46.88	CPI(M)	Promotha Ranjan Thakur	44.06	Congress
1977	3,71,930	58.30	Bibha Ghosh (Goswami)	53.80	CPI (M)	Nitaipada Sarkar	29.49	CPI
1980	5,62,490	78.29	Bibha Ghosh (Goswami)	54.69	CPI (M)	Ananda Mohan Biswas	39.54	Congress
1984	6,95,770	81.23	Bibha Ghosh (Goswami)	49.97	CPI (M)	Apurba Lal Mazumdar	48.99	Congress
1989	9,18,060	85.30	Asim Bala	51.86	CPI (M)	Ananda Mohan Biswas	46.03	Congress
1991	9,12,200	83.37	Asim Bala	46.66	CPI (M)	Apurba Lal Mazumdar	39.24	Congress
1996	11,35,000	86.89	Asim Bala	46.98	CPI (M)	Protap Kanti Roy	43.47	Congress
1998	10,89,650	83.92	Asim Bala	43.04	CPI (M)	Dr. Ramendra Nath Biswas	39.22	Trinamool Congress
1999	10,14,380	76.83	Ananda Mohan Biswas	45.84	Trinamool Congress	Asim Bala	41.93	CPI (M)
Bye Election, 2003	10,69,779	81.60	Alakesh Das	48.13	CPI (M)	Abir Ranjan Biswas	39.29	Trinamool Congress
2004	11,77,770	84.76	Alakesh Das	47.56	CPI (M)	Nilima Nag (Mallick)	46.71	Trinamool Congress

== See also ==
- Nabadwip
- List of constituencies of the Lok Sabha
