= Braja Kishore Goswami =

Indian politician

Member of the West Bengal Legislative Assembly
- In office 2021 – 4 May 2026
- Preceded by: Jagannath Sarkar
- Succeeded by: Swapan Kumar Das
- Constituency: Santipur

Personal details
- Born: 3 December 1988 (age 37) Kolkata, West Bengal
- Party: All India Trinamool Congress
- Education: M.A. in Political Science, Kalyani University
- Occupation: Politician
- Profession: Social Worker

Braja Kishore Goswami (born 3 December 1988) is an Indian politician who serves as a Member of Legislative Assembly from Santipur constituency in West Bengal. He is also a prominent social reformer and religious glory of Shantipur in Nadia, West Bengal. He is one of the youngest educated political leaders of West Bengal.

== Personal life ==
Goswami is the son of Mr. Prashanta Kumar Goswami. He did his schooling at Bhushan Das Shishu Niketan School at Shantipur. Later, he completed his MA in political science from Kalyani University in Kolkata in 2012. His mother, Shankari Goswami, is a housewife. Pravupada Shanti Sokha Goswami, his grandfather was a prominent religious figure as well as a social reformer.

== Political career ==
He won the 2021 by-election held 30 October 2021 from the Santipur Assembly constituency representing the All India Trinamool Congress and defeated his nearest rival, Niranjan Biswas.
