= Taraknagar railway station =

Railway station in West Bengal, India

Taraknagar

General information
- Location: Shivniwas Road, Taraknagar, Krishnaganj, Nadia, West Bengal; India
- Coordinates: 23°22′48″N 88°40′50″E
- Elevation: 12 m (39 ft)
- System: Indian Railways station Kolkata Suburban Railway station
- Owner: Indian Railways
- Operator: Eastern Railway
- Line: Ranaghat–Gede line of Kolkata Suburban Railway
- Platforms: 2
- Tracks: 2

Construction
- Structure type: Standard (on-ground station)
- Cycle facilities: Not available

Other information
- Status: Functioning
- Station code: TNX
- Zone(s): Eastern Railway
- Division(s): Sealdah

History
- Opened: 1862
- Electrified: 1997–98
- Former names: Eastern Bengal Railway

Services
Preceding station	Kolkata Suburban Railway	Following station
Mayurhat towards Sealdah	Eastern Line Gede line	Majhdia towards Gede
Route map
Location
- Location within West Bengal Location within India

Taraknagar railway station is a railway station on the Ranaghat–Gede line of the Kolkata Suburban Railway system and operated by Eastern Railway. It is situated beside Shivniwas Road at Taraknagar, Krishnaganj of Nadia district in the Indian state of West Bengal. Number of EMUs stop at Taraknagar railway station.

== History ==
The Ranaghat–Gede section was the part of the Eastern Bengal Railway which was opened in 1862 and extended to Kushtia, now in Bangladesh. This was the Calcutta–Siliguri main line but after Partition of India in 1947, this got truncated and what remained India named the Gede branch line. The line including Taraknagar railway station was electrified in 1997–98.
