= Rama Biswas =

Indian politician

Rama Biswas (born 2 September 1959) is an Indian politician from West Bengal. She is a former member of the West Bengal Legislative Assembly from Ranaghat Dakshin Assembly constituency, which is reserved for the Scheduled Caste Community, in Nadia district. She was last elected in the 2016 West Bengal Legislative Assembly election representing the Communist Party of India (Marxist).

== Early life and education ==
Biswas is from Krishnanagar, Ranaghat, Nadia district, West Bengal. She was married to late Jnanendra Nath Biswas. She completed her Master of Arts at Netaji Subhas Open University in 2012.

== Career ==
Biswas was elected as an MLA for the first time from Ranaghat Dakshin Assembly constituency representing the Communist Party of India (Marxist) in the 2016 West Bengal Legislative Assembly election. She polled 104,159 votes and defeated her nearest rival, Abir Ranjan Biswas of the All India Trinamool Congress, by a margin of 17,253 votes. However, she lost the next election in the 2021 West Bengal Legislative Assembly election as she could only finish third. Mukut Mani Adhikari of the Bharatiya Janata Party won the election defeating Barnali Dey Roy of the All India Trinamool Congress by a margin of 16,515 votes. Biswas could only get 15,124 votes.

She also contested the Ranaghat Lok Sabha constituency in the 2019 Indian general election in West Bengal and finished third behind winner Jagannath Sarkar of the Bharatiya Janata Party and second-placed Rupali Biswas of the Trinamool Congress.
