= Majhdia, Krishnaganj =

Majhdia
- Village
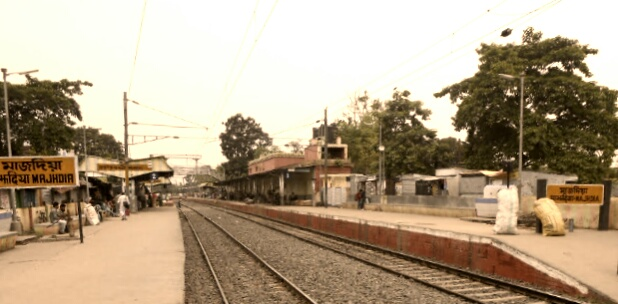
- Majdia Railway station

- Location in West Bengal, India
- Coordinates: 23.4149°N 88.7196°E
- Country: India
- State: West Bengal
- District: Nadia
- Elevation: 14 m (46 ft)

Population (2011)
  - Total: 11,995

Languages
  - Official: Bengali, English
- Time zone: UTC+5:30 (IST)
- Postal code: 741507
- Lok Sabha constituency: Ranaghat
- Vidhan Sabha constituency: Krishnaganj
- Website: nadia.nic.in

Majhdia, also known as Majdia, is a village in the Krishnaganj CD block in the Krishnanagar Sadar subdivision of the Nadia district, West Bengal, India.

== Geography ==
Cities and towns in Krishnanagr Sadar subdivision of Nadia district
M: municipal town/ city, CT: census town, R: rural/ urban centre, H: place of historical/ religious interest, T: place of tourist interest.
Owing to space constraints in the small map, the actual locations in a larger map may vary slightly

=== Location ===
Majhdia is located at 23.4149°N 88.7196°E.

=== Area overview ===
Nadia district is mostly alluvial plains, lying to the east of Hooghly River, locally known as Bhagirathi. The alluvial plains are cut across by such distributaries as the Jalangi, Churni and Ichhamati. With these rivers getting silted up, floods are a recurring features. The Krishnanagar Sadar subdivision, presented in the map alongside, has Bhagirathi River on the west, with Purba Bardhaman district lying across the river. The long stretch along the Bhagirathi has many swamps. The area between the Bhagirathi and the Jalangi, which flows through the middle of the subdivision, is known as Kalantar, a low-lying tract of black clay soil. A big part of the subdivision forms the Krishnanagar-Santipur Plain, which occupies the central part of the district. After flowing through the middle of the subdivision, the Jalangi turns right and joins the Bhagirathi. On the south-east, the Churni separates the Krishnanagar-Santipur Plain from the Ranaghat-Chakdaha Plain. The east forms the boundary with Bangladesh. The subdivision is moderately urbanized. 20.795% of the population lives in urban areas and 79.205% lives in rural areas.

Note: The map alongside presents some of the notable locations in the subdivision. All places marked in the map are linked in the larger full screen map. All the four subdivisions are presented with maps on the same scale – the size of the maps vary as per the area of the subdivision.

== Demographics ==
According to the 2011 Census of India, Majhdia had a total population of 11,995, of which 6,112 (51%) were males and 5,883 (49%) were females. Population in the age range 0–6 years was 1,163. The total number of literate persons in Majhdia was 8,315 (76.76% of the population over 6 years).

== Civic administration ==
=== CD block HQ ===
The headquarters of Krishnaganj CD block are located at Majhdia.

== Economy ==
Mainly based on agro-economy(based on agriculture). Fruits like mangoes, litchi & vegetables are regularly sent to Kolkata by train & trucks. Mangoes & jackfruits are directly sent to other states like Punjab, UP, etc. "KHEJUR-GUR" of Majhdia is very popular in the state. Even Majhdia is experiencing to export this "gur" to USA, UK, Canada.

Majhdia also earns fame for the Raj Rajeswar temple located in Shibnibash, a hamlet in the region. Constructed in 1754, the temple houses a 9 ft (108 in) high Shiva linga, one of the largest in the country. It is one of four temples built by Raja Krishnachandra of Nadia in the 18th century. Three temples still survive.

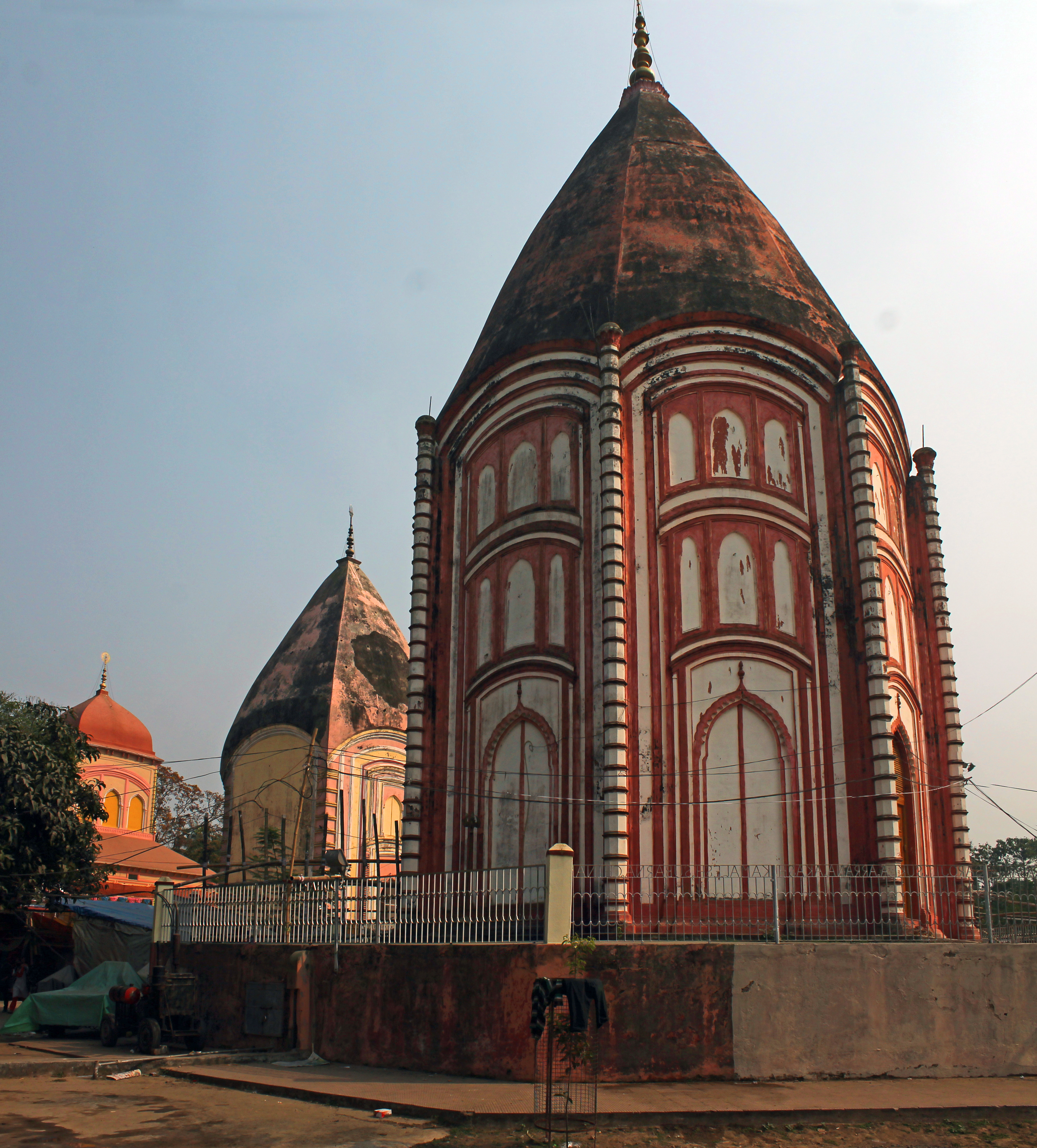
The three temples of Shibnibash, Nadia

== Education ==
Majhdia college known as Sudhiranjan Lahiri Mahavidyalaya is situated here. Majdia Rail Bazar High School (boys) and Shib Mohini Kanya Vidyapith (girls) are the schools, providing 10+2 education to the locals & surrounding areas. There are many primary schools in the locality.

== Transport ==
State Highway 8, originates from Majhdia and runs to Santaldih (in Purulia district).

Majhdia railway station is connected by railway with Kolkata through the Sealdah–Ranaghat - Gede line. Bus services are frequently available towards district sadar Krishnagar and Ranaghat town.
