= Lakshmi Kanta Maitra =

Indian politician

Member of Parliament, Lok Sabha
- In office 1952–1957
- Succeeded by: Ila Pal Choudhury
- Constituency: Nabadwip, West Bengal

Personal details
- Born: July 1895
- Party: Indian National Congress

Pandit Lakshmi Kanta Maitra was an Indian politician. He was a Member of Parliament, representing Nabadwip, West Bengal in the Lok Sabha the lower house of India's Parliament as a member of the Indian National Congress. He was also a member of the Constituent Assembly of India.
