= Gouranga Bridge =

Bridge in West Bengal

Gouranga Bridge গৌরাঙ্গ সেতু
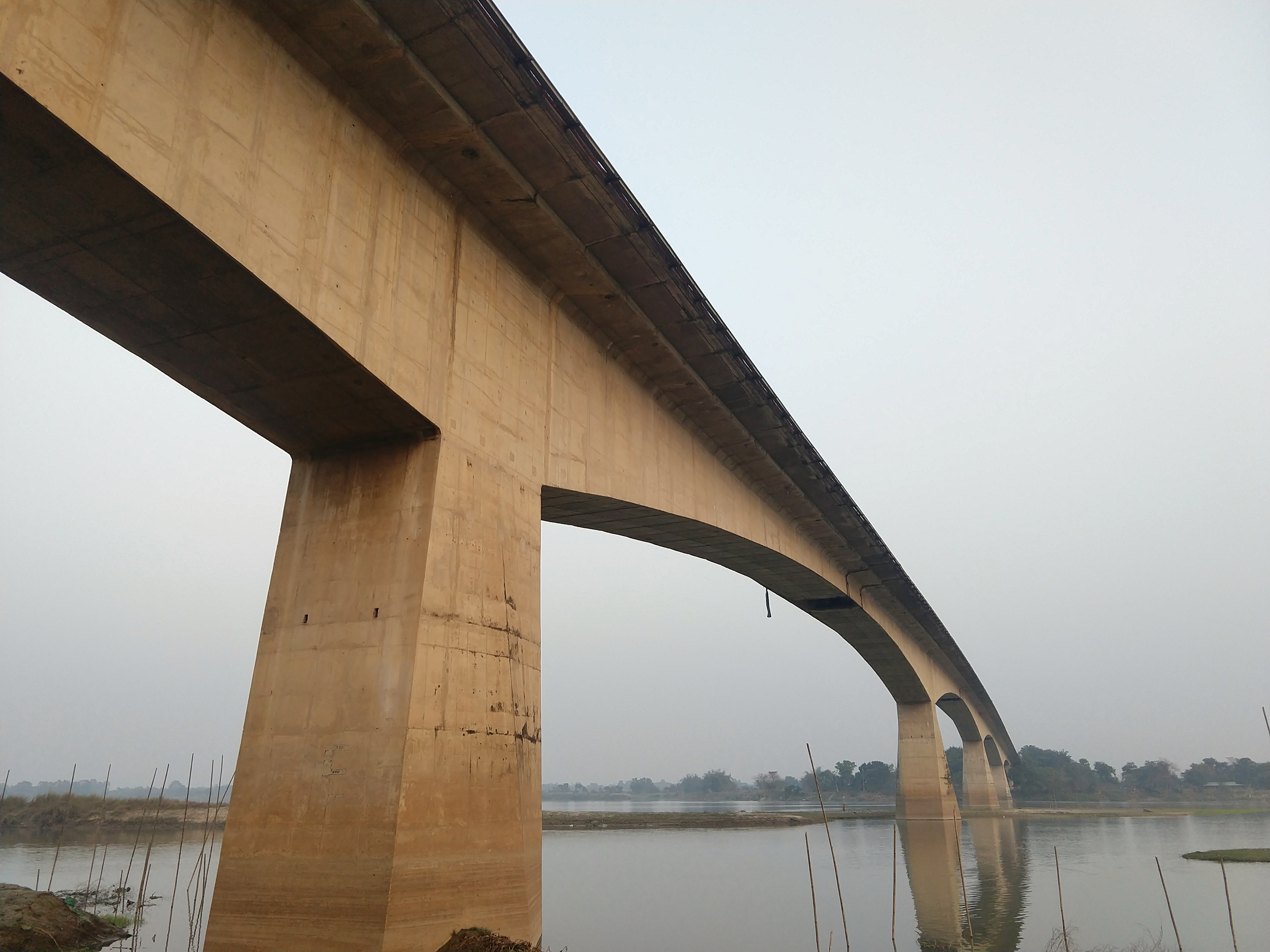
- Gouranga Bridge in 2020
- Coordinates: 23.385928°N 88.366555°E
- Carries: Motor vehicles, pedestrians and bicycles
- Crosses: Bhagirathi River
- Locale: Nabadwip, Nadia, West Bengal, India
- Official name: Gouranga Setu
- Named for: Chaitanya Mahaprabhu
- Owner: PWD
- Maintained by: PWD Burdwan Division-I (till 2016); PWD Nadia Division-I (since 2016)

Characteristics
- Design: Bored piling method
- Material: Concrete
- Total length: 558 m (1,831 ft)

History
- Constructed by: Gammon India Limited
- Construction start: 1972
- Construction end: January 1983
- Opened: January 16, 1983; 42 years ago

Statistics
- Daily traffic: Goods and passenger cars
- Toll: Yes

Gouranga Bridge is a 588 m (1,929 ft) long Road bridge that crosses the Bhagirathi River in between Nabadwip and Krishnanagar, Nadia in West Bengal. It is the part of State highway 8.

== History ==
In 1972, the then Minister of Public Works, Bhola Sen, laid the foundation stone of the Gouranga Bridge to connect Nabadwip and Krishnanagar. Gammon India Limited took the responsibility to construct the bridge. On 16 January 1983, Minister of Public Works of Left Front Government, Jatin Chakraborty inaugurated the bridge. The bridge is built in the Class-A stage in terms of carrying load according to the importance and demand of the connecting cities.

== Design and Construction ==
Gouranga Bridge is built of pre‑stressed concrete girders supported on bored‐pile piers designed to resist Bhagirathi’s strong monsoon currents. Its six equal spans, each about 93 m long are carried on piers sunk 15–20 m below the riverbed for scour protection. Toll collection began in 1983 and continues under PWD Nadia Division‑I, with rates reviewed biennially.

Routine inspections in 2016 revealed scour damage at two piers, prompting emergency embankment repairs; in 2021, dislocated expansion joints led to a temporary ban on heavy vehicles until replacement works were completed. Cracks were spotted in the concrete deck, prompting police and residents to halt all heavy‑vehicle traffic and prevent a potential collapse. The Gouranga Bridge experienced a similar crack incident in October 2024 on the eve of Durga Puja, when an expansion joint dislocation forced authorities to halt all traffic and initiate emergency repairs.
