= Ananda Mohan Biswas =

Indian politician (1939–2003)

Member of Parliament, Lok Sabha
- In office 1999-2003
- Preceded by: Asim Bala
- Succeeded by: Alakesh Das
- Constituency: Nabadwip West Bengal

Personal details
- Born: 21 June 1939 Munshiganj, Nadia district, Bengal Presidency, British India
- Died: 3 February 2003 (aged 63)
- Party: Trinamool Congress
- Other political affiliations: Indian National Congress

Ananda Mohan Biswas (1939—3 February 2003) was an Indian politician. He was elected to the Lok Sabha, the lower house of the Parliament of India from the Nabadwip in West Bengal as a member of the Trinamool Congress.
