= Shibnibas =

Village in West Bengal, India

- Village
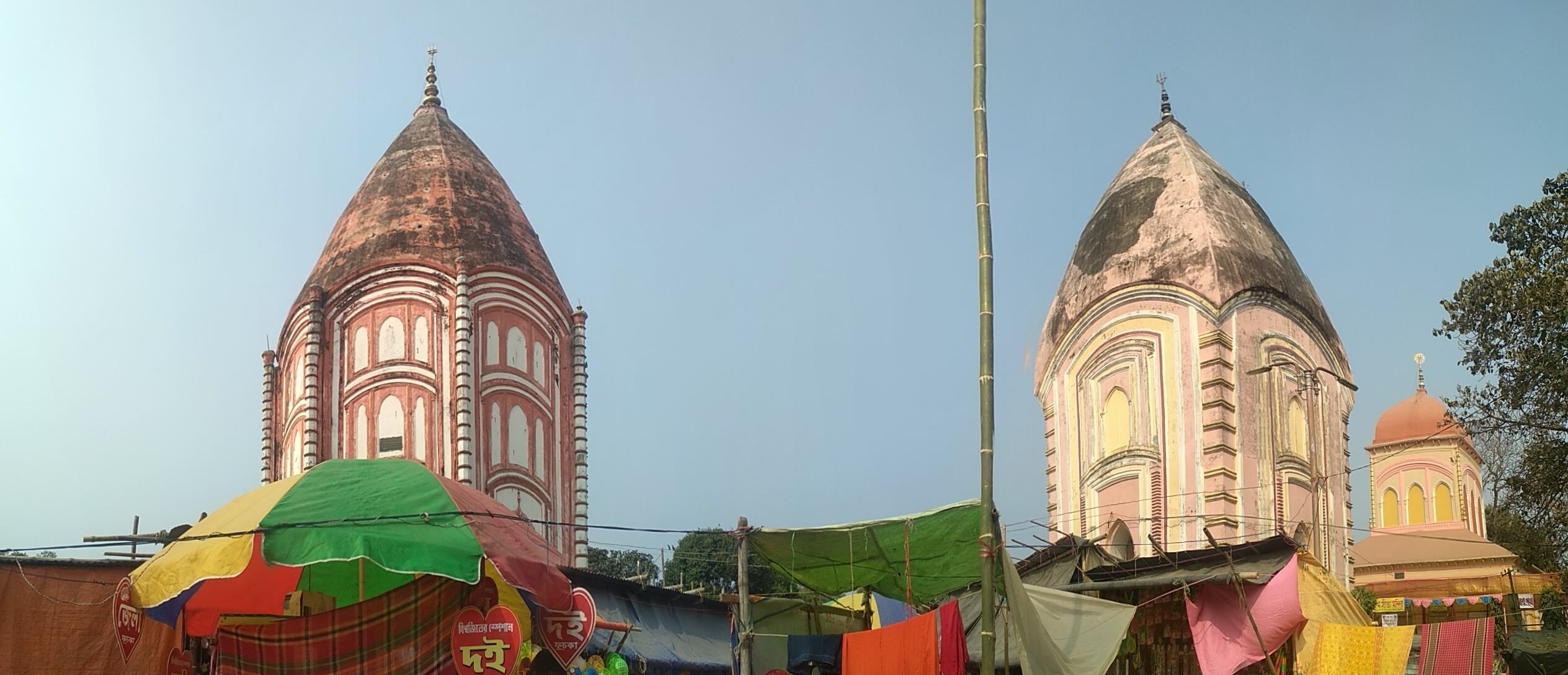
- Three Temples of Shibnibash

- Location in West Bengal, India Shibnibas (India)
- Coordinates: 23°25′N 88°41′E
- Country: India
- State: West Bengal
- District: Nadia

Population (2011)
  - Total: 2,481

Languages
  - Official: Bengali
- Time zone: UTC+5:30 (IST)

Shibnibas is a village located in Krishnaganj subdivision of Nadia district in West Bengal, India. It belongs to the Presidency division and is situated 21 km to the east of the district headquarters, Krishnanagar, Nadia. It is located 3 km away from Krishnaganj and is situated 113 km away from the state capital, Kolkata. Shibnibas is known for its rich history and cultural heritage. It is locate don the bank of Churni River.

== History ==
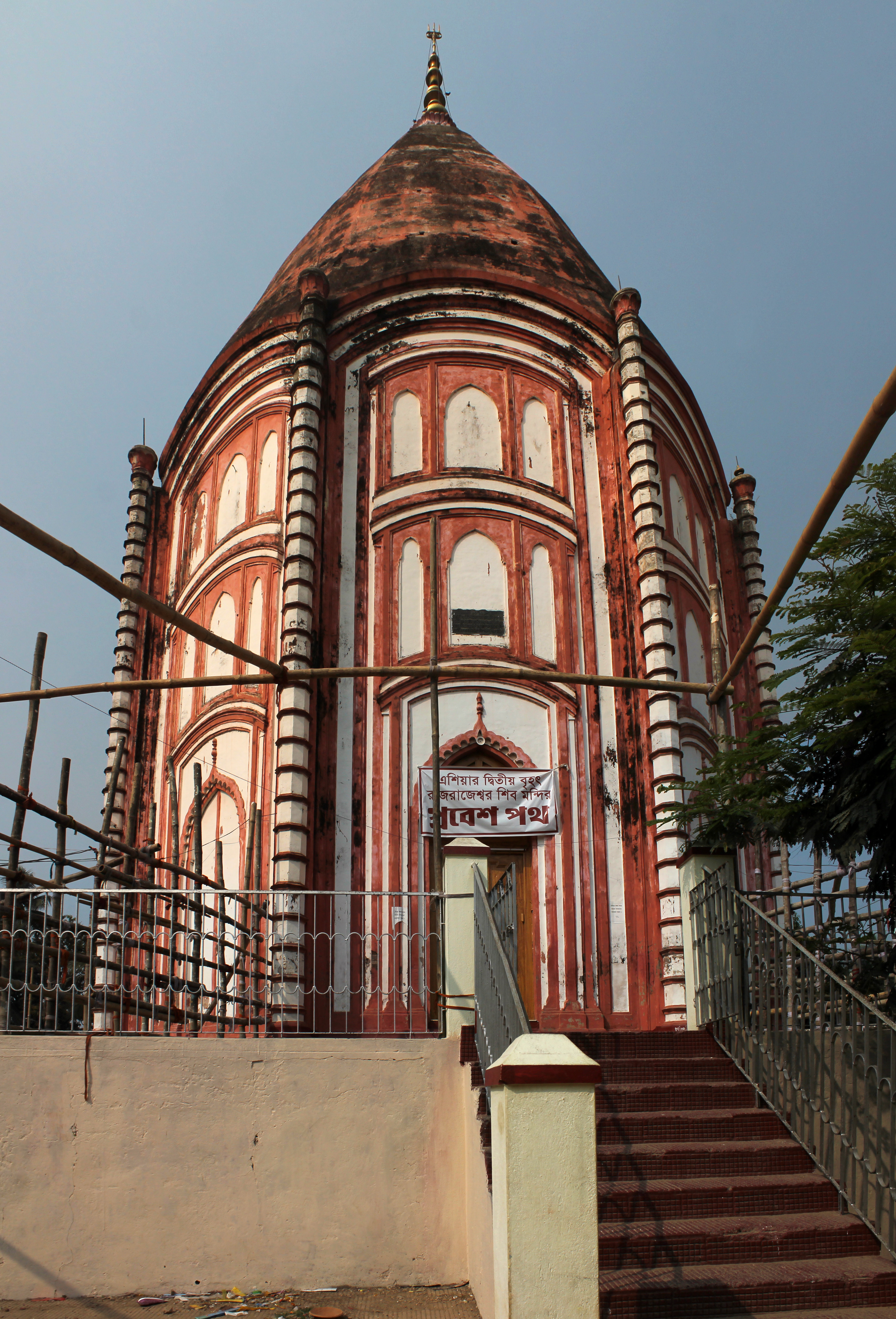
Rajrajeshwar temple of Shibnibash

The town has three temples built by Krishnachandra Roy, two dedicated to Shiva and one to Ram and Sita. One of the Shiva temples, known as Raj-Rajeshwar, was built in 1754 and contains a nine-foot high Shivling (known locally as Buro Shib, or the Old Shiva). The temples have been repaired and repainted over the years. A fair is held during the Mahashivratri festival.

Shibnibas village derives its name from the abundance of Shiva temples present in the area. The name Shibnibas is a combination of two words: Shib, which refers to Lord Shiva, and Nibas (Nivas), which means residence.

As per the records of the Bishop of Calcutta (now Kolkata), Reginald Heber visited Shibnibas during his journey to Dacca in 1824. At that time there were four Shiva temples in the village.

== Independence Day ==
Independence Day in Shibnibas is celebrated on 18 August instead of 15 August, which is the official date of India's Independence Day. This celebration is due to the fact that Shibnibas became a part of East Pakistan (now Bangladesh) during the partition at the time of India's independence. On 17 August 1947, the village reincluded to India and the villagers celebrated their independence on 18 August.

This event was forgotten till 1991 when a residence of Shibnibas named Anjan Sukul decided to celebrate Independence Day on 18 August. He took permission from the Ministry of Information and Broadcasting, Government of India and celebrated Independence Day on 18 August 1991, in Shibnibas. In 1998, the villagers formed a registered organization named the '18 August Committee'. The celebration is attended by various local and national organizations. The Border Security Force personnel also participate in the festivities.

== Demography ==
As per the 2011 Census of India, Shibnibas has a total population of 2481 with 631 households. Its population is predominantly from the Scheduled Caste community, which makes up 82.7% of the total population. The literacy rate of the village is 62.3%, with the female literacy rate at a lower 27.3%. The working population percentage is 33.8%. The population of children aged 0–6 is 243, with female children making up 49.4% of that number. The local language spoken in Shibnibas is Bengali.
