= Ajoy Dey =

Indian politician (1952–2021)

Member of the West Bengal Legislative Assembly
- In office 1991–2016
- Preceded by: Bimalananda Mukherjee
- Succeeded by: Arindam Bhattacharya
- Constituency: Santipur

Personal details
- Born: 22 April 1952 Shantipur, West Bengal
- Died: 21 May 2021 (aged 69) Belle Vue Clinic, Kolkata
- Party: Indian National Congress; All India Trinamool Congress

Ajoy Dey (22 April 1952 – 21 May 2021) was an Indian politician who has been involved in the politics with the All India Trinamool Congress. He was an MLA from the Indian state of West Bengal and also was the Chairman of Santipur Municipality which is the second oldest Municipality of West Bengal established in 1853.

== Biography ==
Earlier he was a politician from Indian National Congress. From 1991 to 2016, he was the MLA for the Shantipur Assembly constituency in the West Bengal Legislative Assembly.

Dey died on 21 May 2021 from COVID-19.
