= Krishnaganj (community development block) =

- Community development block
- Coordinates: 23.3906338°N 88.7420654°E
- Country: India
- State: West Bengal
- District: Nadia

Government
  - Type: Community development block

Area
  - Total: 151.60 km^{2} (58.53 sq mi)
- Elevation: 12 m (39 ft)

Population (2011)
  - Total: 146,705
  - Density: 967.71/km^{2} (2,506.4/sq mi)

Languages
  - Official: Bengali, English

Literacy (2011)
  - Total literates: 96,222 (72.86%)
- Time zone: UTC+5:30 (IST)
- PIN: 741506 (Krishnaganj); 741509 (Chandannagar); 741503 (Banpur); 741514 (Bhajanghat)
- Telephone/STD code: 03472
- ISO 3166 code: IN-WB
- Vehicle registration: WB-51, WB-51
- Lok Sabha constituency: Ranaghat
- Vidhan Sabha constituency: Krishnaganj
- Website: nadia.nic.in

Krishnaganj is a community development block that forms an administrative division in Krishnanagar Sadar subdivision of Nadia district in the Indian state of West Bengal.

== Geography ==
Bhajanghat, a constituent panchayat of this block, is located at 23°23′26″N 88°44′31″E.

Krishnaganj CD Block is bounded by Damurhuda and Chuadnga Sadar upazilas Chuadanga District, of Bangladesh, on the north, Jibannagar upazila of Chuadanga District of Bangladesh, in the east, Hanskhali CD Block in the south and Krishnanagar I and Chapra CD Blocks in the west.

Krishnaganj CD Block has an area of 151.60 km^{2}. It has 1 panchayat samity, 7 gram panchayats, 112 gram sansads (village councils), 54 mouzas and 52 inhabited villages. Krishnaganj police station serves this block. Headquarters of this CD Block is at Majhdia. It is located 24 km from Krishnanagar, the district headquarters.

Nadia district is mostly alluvial plains lying to the east of Hooghly River, locally known as Bhagirathi. The alluvial plains are cut across by such distributaries as Jalangi, Churni and Ichhamati. With these rivers getting silted up, floods are a recurring feature.

Gram panchayats of Krishnaganj block/ panchayat samiti are: Bhajanghat Tungi, Gobindapur, Joyghata, Krishnaganj, Matiary Banpur, Shibnibas and Taldah Majdia.

== Demographics ==
=== Population ===
As per the 2011 Census of India, Krishnaganj CD Block had a population of 146,705, all of which were rural. There were 75,573 (52%) males and 71,132 (48%) females. The population below 6 years was 14,638. Scheduled Castes numbered 66,818 (45.55%) and Scheduled Tribes numbered 9,492 (6.47%).

As per the 2001 census, Krishnaganj block had a population of 133,385, out of which 68,547 were males and 64,838 were females. Krishnaganj block registered a population growth of 18.17 per cent during the 1991-2001 decade. Decadal growth for the district was 19.51 per cent. Decadal growth in West Bengal was 17.84 per cent.

Large villages (with 4,000+ population) in Krishnaganj CD Block were (2011 census figures in brackets): Jayghata (4,327), Durgapur (4,717), Chaugachha (6,054), Chandan Nagar (5,419), Songhata (4,498), Banpur (5,888), Gede (5,396), Matiari (7,301), Tungi (7,803), Majhdia (11,995), Helenchi (4,610) and Bhajanghat (5,206).

Other villages in Krishnaganj CD Block include (2011 census figures in brackets): Shibnibas (2,481), Krishnaganj (3,192), Taldaha (2,845), Gobindapur (2,111).

=== Literacy ===
As per the 2011 census, the total number of literates in Krishnaganj CD Block was 96,222 (72.86% of the population over 6 years) out of which males numbered 52,754 (77.43% of the male population over 6 years) and females numbered 43,468 (67.98% of the female population over 6 years). The gender disparity (the difference between female and male literacy rates) was 9.45%.

See also – List of West Bengal districts ranked by literacy rate

Literacy in CD blocks of
Nadia district
Tehatta subdivision
Karimpur I – 67.70%
Karimpur II – 62.04%
Tehatta I – 70.72%
Tehatta II – 68.52%
Krishnanagar Sadar subdivision
Kaliganj – 65.89%
Nakashipara – 64.86%
Chapra – 68.25%
Krishnanagar I – 71.45%
Krishnanagar II – 68.52%
Nabadwip – 67.72%
Krishnaganj – 72.86%
Ranaghat subdivision
Hanskhali – 80.11%
Santipur – 73.10%
Ranaghat I – 77.61%
Ranaghat II – 79.38%
Kalyani subdivision
Chakdaha – 64.17%
Haringhata – 82.15%
Source: 2011 Census: CD Block Wise
Primary Census Abstract Data

=== Language and religion ===
Religion in Krishnaganj CD block (2011)
Hinduism	93.98%
Islam	5.87%
Other or not stated	0.15%

In the 2011 census, Hindus numbered 137,874 and formed 93.98% of the population in Krishnaganj CD Block. Muslims numbered 8,598 and formed 5.87% of the population. Christians numbered 138 and formed 0.09% of the population. Others numbered 95 and formed 0.06% of the population.

In the 2001 census, Hindus numbered 125,642 and formed 94.21% of the population of Krishnaganj CD Block. Muslims numbered 7,482 and formed 5.61% of the population. In the 1991 census, Hindus numbered 106,929 and formed 94.73% of the population of Krishnaganj CD Block. Muslims numbered 5,903 and formed 5.23% of the population.

Bengali is the predominant language, spoken by 99.37% of the population.

== Rural poverty ==
The District Human Development Report for Nadia has provided a CD Block-wise data table for Modified Human Vulnerability Index of the district. Krishnaganj CD Block registered 30.44 on the MHPI scale. The CD Block-wise mean MHVI was estimated at 33.92. A total of 8 out of the 17 CD Blocks in Nadia district were found to be severely deprived when measured against the CD Block mean MHVI - Karimpur I and Karimpur II (under Tehatta subdivision), Kaliganj, Nakashipara, Chapra, Krishnanagar I and Nabadwip (under Krishnanagar Sadar subdivision) and Santipur (under Ranaghat subdivision) appear to be backward.

As per the Human Development Report 2004 for West Bengal, the rural poverty ratio in Nadia district was 28.35%. The estimate was based on Central Sample data of NSS 55th round 1999–2000.

== Economy ==
=== Livelihood ===
In Krishnaganj CD Block in 2011, amongst the class of total workers, cultivators formed 23.25%, agricultural labourers 37.72%, household industry workers 6.75% and other workers 32.28%.

The southern part of Nadia district starting from Krishnanagar I down to Chakdaha and Haringhata has some urban pockets specialising in either manufacturing or service related economic activity and has reflected a comparatively higher concentration of population but the urban population has generally stagnated. Nadia district still has a large chunk of people living in the rural areas.

=== Infrastructure ===
There are 52 inhabited villages in Krishnaganj CD Block. 100% villages have power supply and drinking water supply. 21 Villages (40.38%) have post offices. 47 villages (90.38%) have telephones (including landlines, public call offices and mobile phones). 46 villages (88.46%) have a pucca approach road and 34 villages (65.38%) have transport communication (includes bus service, rail facility and navigable waterways). 11 villages (23.08%) have agricultural credit societies and 12 villages (18.18%) have banks. It should, however, be noted that although 100% villages in Nadia district had power supply in 2011, a survey in 2007-08 revealed that less than 50% of households had electricity connection. In rural areas of the country, the tube well was for many years considered to be the provider of safe drinking water, but with arsenic contamination of ground water claiming public attention it is no longer so. Piped water supply is still a distant dream. In 2007–08, the availability of piped drinking water in Nadia district was as low as 8.6%, well below the state average of around 20%.

=== Agriculture ===
Persons engaged in agriculture
in Krishnaganj CD Block
1. Bargadars (6.90%)
2. Patta holders (10.7%)
3. Small farmers (6.35%)
4. Marginal farmers (30.6%)
5. Agricultural labourers (45.5%)

Although the Bargadari Act of 1950 recognised the rights of bargadars to a higher share of crops from the land that they tilled, it was not implemented fully. Large tracts, beyond the prescribed limit of land ceiling, remained with the rich landlords. From 1977 onwards major land reforms took place in West Bengal. Land in excess of land ceiling was acquired and distributed amongst the peasants. Following land reforms land ownership pattern has undergone transformation. In 2013–14, persons engaged in agriculture in Krishnaganj CD Block could be classified as follows: bargadars 6.90%, patta (document) holders 10.65%, small farmers (possessing land between 1 and 2 hectares) 6.35%, marginal farmers (possessing land up to 1 hectare) 30.59% and agricultural labourers 45.50%. As the proportion of agricultural labourers is very high, the real wage in the agricultural sector has been a matter of concern.

Krishnaganj CD Block had 9 fertiliser depots, 6 seed stores and 30 fair price shops in 2013–14.

In 2013–14, Krishnaganj CD Block produced 2,488 tonnes of Aman paddy, the main winter crop from 991 hectares, 5,286 tonnes of Boro paddy (spring crop) from 1,486 hectares, 2.138 tonnes of Aus paddy (summer crop) from 931 hectares, 1,252 tonnes of wheat from 415 hectares, 61,195 tonnes of jute from 3,808 hectares and 1,240 tonnes of potatoes from 40 hectares. It also produced pulses and oilseeds.

In 2013–14, the total area irrigated in Krishnaganj CD Block was 1,567 hectares, out of which 1,007 hectares were irrigated by river lift irrigation and 560 hectares by deep tube wells.

=== Banking ===
In 2013–14, Krishnaganj CD Block had offices of 4 commercial banks and 3 gramin banks.

== Transport ==
Krihnaganj CD Block has 7 ferry services and 4 originating/ terminating bus services.

The main line of the Eastern Bengal Railway from Sealdah to Ranaghat, was opened in 1862 and extended to Kushtia, now in Bangladesh, the same year. After partition of India in 1947, the main line got truncated and what remained in the southern part of West Bengal formed the Gede branch line. As of 2017, Gede railway station, in this block, is the last railway station in India and border checkpoint on way to Bangladesh.

SH 8, originates from Majhdia in this CD Block and runs to Santaldih (in Purulia district).

== Education ==
In 2013–14, Krishnaganj CD Block had 95 primary schools with 6,626 students, 6 middle schools with 866 students, 4 high school with 2,081 students and 13 higher secondary schools with 16,052 students. Krishnaganj CD Block had 1 general college with 4,120 students and 300 institutions for special and non-formal education with 7,486 students

In Krishnaganj CD Block, amongst the 52 inhabited villages, 2 villages did not have any school, 35 had more than 1 primary school, 23 had at least 1 primary and 1 middle school and 15 had at least 1 middle and 1 secondary school.

== Healthcare ==
In 2014, Krishnaganj CD Block had 1 rural hospital and 3 primary health centres, with total 35 beds and 4 doctors (excluding private bodies). It had 21 family welfare subcentres. 2,286 patients were treated indoor and 206,614 patients were treated outdoor in the hospitals, health centres and subcentres of the CD Block.

Krishnaganj Rural Hospital, with 25 beds at Krishnaganj, is the major government medical facility in the Krishnaganj CD block. There are primary health centres at Matiari (Banpur) (with 10 beds), Joyghata (with 4 beds) and Bhajanghat (with 6 beds).

Krishnaganj CD Block is one of the areas of Nadia district where ground water is affected by high level of arsenic contamination. The WHO guideline for arsenic in drinking water is 10 mg/ litre, and the Indian Standard value is 50 mg/ litre. All the 17 blocks of Nadia district have arsenic contamination above this level. The maximum concentration in Krishnaganj CD Block is 594 mg/litre.
