= State Highway 8 (West Bengal) =

Road in West Bengal, India

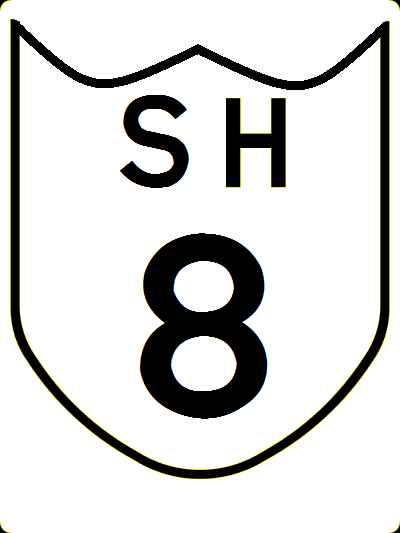
State Highway 8

Route information
- Length: 292 km (181 mi)

Major junctions
- From: Santaldih
- SH 5 at Raghunathpur; SH 9 from Bankura to Beliatore; SH 7 from Chak Purohit to Mirzapur; SH 6 from Nadanghat Morh to Hematpur Morh; NH 12 at Krishnanagar; SH 3 at Krishnanagar
- To: Majhdia

Location
- Country: India
- State: West Bengal
- Districts: Purulia, Bankura, Purba Bardhaman, Nadia

Highway system
- Roads in India; Expressways; National; State; Asian; State Highways in West Bengal

State Highway 8 (West Bengal) is a state highway in West Bengal, India.

== Route ==
SH 8 originates from Santaldih and passes through Cheliyama, Raghunathpur, Santuri, Saltora, Chhatna, Bankura, Beliatore, Sonamukhi, Patrasayer, Khandaghosh, Mirzapur, Kurmun, Kusumgram, Nadanghat, Krishnanagar and Krishnaganj before terminating at Majhdia, a village with a railway station on the Gede branch line, near India-Bangladesh border.

The total length of SH 8 is 292 km.

Districts traversed by SH 8 are:
Purulia district (0 – 58 km)
Bankura district (58 – 170 km)
Purba Bardhaman district (170 – 196 km)
Nadia district (196 – 292 km)

== Road sections ==
It is divided into different sections as follows:

Road Section	District	CD Block	Length (km)
Santaldih-Raghunathpur	Purulia	Para, Raghunathpur II, Raghunathpur I	28
Ragunathpur-Saltora	Purulia, Bankura	Santuri, Saltora	30
Saltora-Bankura	Bankura	Chhatna, Bankura II	46
Bankura-Beliatore	Bankura	Barjora	22
Beliatore-Sonamukhi-Patrasayer-Rasulpur	Bankura	Sonamukhi, Patrasayer	44
Rasulpur-Khandaghosh-Chakpurohit	Bankura, Purba Bardhaman	Indas, Khandaghosh	26
Chakpurohit-Mirzapur (via SH 7)	Purba Bardhaman	Burdwan I, Burdwan II	
Mirzapur-Malamba-Kusumgram Samudragarh	Purba Bardhaman, Nadia	MEMARI-II][Manteswar (community development block)|Manteswar]], Kalna I	55
Gouranga Bridge	Nadia	Nabadwip	60
Gouranga Bridge-Krishnanagar	Nadia	Krishnanagar I	8
Krishnanagar-Majhdia	Nadia	Krishnaganj	28

== See also ==
- List of state highways in West Bengal
