= Pundarikakshya Saha =

Indian politician from West Bengal (b.1955)

Member of the West Bengal Legislative Assembly
- In office 23 May 2001 – 5 May 2026
- Preceded by: Biswanath Mitra
- Succeeded by: Srutisekhar Goswami
- Constituency: Nabadwip

Personal details
- Born: 30 December 1955 (age 70) Nadia, West Bengal, India
- Party: All India Trinamool Congress
- Parent: Gurupada Saha (father)
- Education: Bachelor of Commerce (Nabadwip Vidyasagar College)
- Profession: Politician

Pundarikakshya Saha (born 30 December 1955) is an Indian politician from West Bengal. He was as a member of the West Bengal Legislative Assembly from Nabadwip constituency from 2001 to 2026 . He is a member of All India Trinamool Congress. He was one of the MLAs with lowest assets in India with INR 30,423.

== Early life and education ==
Saha is from Nabadwip, Nadia district, West Bengal. He is the son of the late Gurupada Saha. He completed his Bachelor of Commerce in 1975 at Nabadwip Vidyasagar College, which is affiliated with University of Calcutta.

== Career ==
Saha won from Nabadwip Assembly constituency representing All India Trinamool Congress in the 2021 West Bengal Legislative Assembly election. He polled 102,170 votes and defeated his nearest rival, Sidhartha Shankar Naskar of the Bharatiya Janata Party, by a margin of 18,571 votes.
