= Sucharu Ranjan Haldar =

Indian politician

Dr. Shucharu Ranjan Haldar

Member of Parliament
- In office 2009-2014
- Preceded by: New Seat
- Succeeded by: Tapas Mondal
- Constituency: Ranaghat

Personal details
- Born: 17 May 1940 (age 86)
- Died: Unknown Kalyani
- Party: Bharatiya Janta Party
- Spouse: Krishna Haldar
- Children: 2 (Susmit Ranjan Haldar)
- Education: MBBS, DTM and H, DDV, MD
- Profession: Politician; Medical Practitioner

Shucharu Ranjan Haldar is a former member of Parliament of India elected from Ranaghat, West Bengal. He is a member of Bharatiya Janta Party. He was born on 17 May 1940. He is a doctor by profession. He has M.B.B.S., DTM and H, BDV, M.D. degrees. He won the 2009 Lok Sabha election from Ranaghat (Lok Sabha constituency) by a margin of 101,823 votes.
