= Shankar Singha =

Indian politician

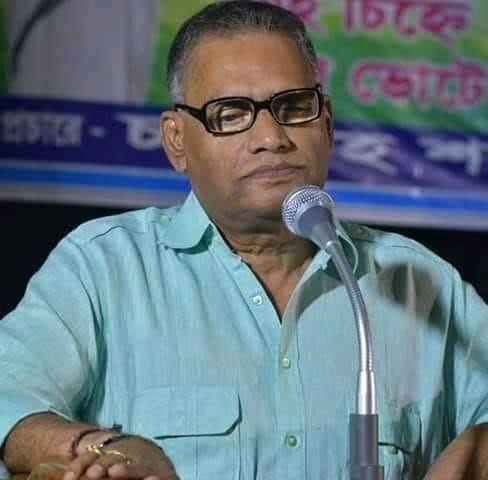

MLA of Ranaghat Uttar Paschim
- In office 1996–2006
- Preceded by: Subhas Basu
- Succeeded by: Aloke Kumar Das

MLA of Ranaghat Uttar Paschim
- In office 2016–2021
- Preceded by: Partha Sarathi Chatterjee
- Succeeded by: Partha Sarathi Chatterjee

Personal details
- Born: Chakdaha
- Party: All India Trinamool Congress
- Children: 2

Shankar Singha is an Indian politician belonging to All India Trinamool Congress. He was elected as a legislator of West Bengal Legislative Assembly in 1996, 2001 and 2016. He joined Trinamool Congress on 21 June 2017 from Indian National Congress.
