= Tapas Mandal =

Indian politician

Member of Parliament, Lok Sabha
- In office 26 May 2014 – 23 May 2019
- Succeeded by: Jagannath Sarkar
- Constituency: Ranaghat

Personal details
- Party: Trinamool Congress

Tapas Mandal (born 1972) is an Indian politician from West Bengal. He is a former Member of Parliament, Lok Sabha representing the All India Trinamool Congress. He was elected in the 2014 Indian general election in West Bengal from the Ranaghat Lok Sabha constituency.

== Early life and education ==
Mandal is from Haringhata, Nadia district, West Bengal. He is the son of Probhas Chandra Mandal. He completed his M.Sc. in 1996 and Ph.D. in 2008. He is a professor in the faculty of Horticulture in Bidhan Chandra Krishi Viswavidyalaya, Mohanpur, Nadia.

== Career ==
Mandal won the Ranaghat Lok Sabha constituency in the 2014 Indian general election. He polled 5,90,451 votes and defeated his nearest rival Archana Biswas of the Communist Party of India (Marxist) by a margin of 2,01,767 votes.
