= Nabadwip Assembly constituency =

Nabadwip
- Constituency No. 84 for the West Bengal Legislative Assembly
- Interactive Map Outlining Nabadwip Assembly Constituency

Constituency details
- Country: India
- Region: East India
- State: West Bengal
- Division: Presidency
- District: Nadia
- Lok Sabha constituency: Ranaghat
- Established: 1951
- Total electors: 230,011
- Reservation: None

Member of Legislative Assembly
- 18th West Bengal Legislative Assembly
- Incumbent Srutisekhar Goswami
- Party: BJP
- Alliance: NDA
- Elected year: 2026
- Preceded by: Pundarikakshya Saha (AITC)

Nabadwip Assembly constituency is an assembly constituency in Nadia district in the Indian state of West Bengal.

== Overview ==
As per orders of the Delimitation Commission, No. 84 Nabadwip Assembly constituency is composed of the following: Nabadwip municipality, Nabadwip community development block, and Bhaluka and Joania gram panchayats of Krishnanagar I community development block.

Nabadwip Assembly constituency is part of No. 13 Ranaghat (Lok Sabha constituency). It was earlier part of Nabadwip (Lok Sabha constituency).

== Members of the Legislative Assembly ==
Year	Name	Party
1951	Niranjan Modak	Indian National Congress
1957	Niranjan Modak	Indian National Congress
1962	Debi Prasad Basu	Communist Party of India
1967	Sachindra Mohan Nandy	Indian National Congress
1969	Sachindra Mohan Nandy	Indian National Congress
1971	Debi Prasad Basu	Communist Party of India (Marxist)
1972	Radha Raman Saha	Indian National Congress
1977	Debi Prosad Basu	Communist Party of India (Marxist)
1982	Debi Prosad Basu	Communist Party of India (Marxist)
1987	Biswanath Mitra	Communist Party of India (Marxist)
1991	Biswanath Mitra	Communist Party of India (Marxist)
1996	Biswanath Mitra	Communist Party of India (Marxist)
2001	Pundarikakhsa Saha	All India Trinamool Congress
2006	Pundarikakhsa Saha	All India Trinamool Congress
2011	Pundarikakhsa Saha	All India Trinamool Congress
2016	Pundarikakhsa Saha	All India Trinamool Congress
2021	Pundarikakhsa Saha	All India Trinamool Congress
2026	Srutisekhar Goswami	Bharatiya Janata Party

== Election results ==
=== 2026 ===
2026 West Bengal Legislative Assembly election: Nabadwip
Party	Candidate	Votes	%	±%
BJP	Srutisekhar Goswami	108,631	49.79	▲10.09
AITC	Pundarikakshya Saha	87,187	39.96	▼8.56
CPI(M)	Swarnendu Sinha	15,612	7.16	▼1.64
NOTA	None of the above	1,016	0.47	▼0.64
Majority		21,444	9.83	▲1.01
Turnout		218,181	94.66	▲8.05
BJP gain from AITC		Swing		

=== 2021 ===
2021 West Bengal Legislative Assembly election: Nabadwip
Party	Candidate	Votes	%	±%
AITC	Pundarikakshya Saha	102,170	48.52	
BJP	Siddartha Naskar	83,599	39.7	
CPI(M)	Swarnendu Singha	18,540	8.8	
NOTA	None of the above	2,344	1.11	
Majority		18,571	8.82	
Turnout		210,589	86.61	
AITC hold		Swing		

=== 2011 ===
In the 2011 election, Pundarkshya Saha of Trinamool Congress defeated his nearest rival Sumit Biswas of CPI(M).

West Bengal assembly elections, 2011: Nabadwip constituency
Party	Candidate	Votes	%	±%
AITC	Pundarikakhsa Saha	94,117	53.45	−2.53#
CPI(M)	Sumit Biswas	71,282	40.49	−3.64
BJP	Pinki Agarwal	7,303	4.15	
CPI(ML)L	Parikshit Paul	336		
Turnout		176,069	88.06	
AITC hold		Swing	1.11	

.# Swing calculated on Congress+Trinamool Congress vote percentages taken together in 2006. On its own the Trinamool Congress vote percentage was +2.35% and the swing was 5.99%.

=== 2006 ===
In the 2006 state assembly elections, Pundarikhsya Saha of Trinamool Congress won the Nabadwip assembly seat defeating his nearest rival Chhaya Sen Sharma of CPI (M). Contests in most years were multi cornered but only winners and runners are being mentioned. In 2001, Pundarikhsya Saha of Trinamool Congress defeated Jamuna Brahmachari of CPI (M). In 1996, Biswanath Mitra of CPI (M) defeated Kartick Chatterjee of Congress. In 1991 and 1987 Biswanath Mitra of CPI(M) defeated Satish Debnath of Congress. In 1982 and 1977 Debi Prosad Basu of CPI (M) defeated Sasthi Bhusan Pal of Congress.

=== 1972 ===
Radha Raman Saha of Congress won in 1972. Debi Prasad Basu of CPI(M) won in 1971. Sachindra Mohan Nandy of Congress won in 1969 and 1967. Debi Prasad Basu of CPI won in 1962. In 1957 and in independent India's first election in 1951, Niranjan Modak of Congress won the Nabadwip seat.
