= Bibha Ghosh Goswami =

Indian politician (1934–2022)

Bibha Gosh Goswami (12 January 1934 – 3 February 2022) was an Indian politician who represented Nabadwip, West Bengal (a constituency reserved for scheduled castes) in the 5th, 6th, 7th, and 8th Lok Sabha. She was a member of the Communist Party of India (Marxist).

== Early life and education ==
Bibha Gosh was on born on 12 January 1934, in Hidia Village, East Bengal (now Bangladesh) to parents Banamali Goswami and Smt. Sudhamani. She is a member of a scheduled caste. She attended M.S.T.P. Girls High School in Jessore and Brahmo Balika Shikshalaya in Calcutta. She went to college at Lady Brabourne (Calcutta, Krishnagar Government College, and University Teachers Training Institute (Calcutta).

== Career ==
=== Lok Sabha ===
Bibha Gosh Goswami served in the fifth Lok Sabha from 1971–77, the sixth Lok Sabha from 1977-1979, the seventh Lok Sabha from 1980-1984 and the eighth Lok Sabha. During her time in the Lok Subha, she was also on the Consultative Committee on Ministry of Education, Social Welfare and Culture from 1977-1984 and on the Joint Committee on Hindu Marriage Act (Amendment) in 1981.

In 1983 she introduced Bill 81 which was to provide for equal pay for women and men, which was promised by the constitution but Bibha Gosh stated that it was not followed through. The bill was passed.

In 1985 Bibha introduced Bill 37 to provide for the Welfare of Women employed in industries to provide them with resources. The Bill lapsed.

She was also involved in the Commission on Sati Prevention Act. 1987. Where most of her focus was on reframing the idea that sati could be voluntary.

=== Associations and offices ===
Goswami was the president of the West Bengal Democratic Women's Association, Nadia District from 1972. She served as the Vice-President from 1974 to 1979. She was also on the executive committee of All India Democratic Women's Association from 1981. Goswami held various offices in the All Bengal Teachers' Association from 1960, and was on the West Bengal State Welfare Advisory Committee from 1977 to 1982.

== Personal life and death ==
Goswami's hobbies included education and history, and she particularly enjoyed the music of Ravindra Sangeet. She died on 3 February 2022, at the age of 88.
