= Swapan Kumar Das =

Indian politician

Member of the West Bengal Legislative Assembly
- Incumbent
- Assumed office 4 May 2026
- Preceded by: Braja Kishore Goswami
- Constituency: Santipur

Personal details
- Party: Bharatiya Janata Party
- Education: Kalyani University(B.ED) Santipur College(B.COM)
- Profession: Politician

Swapan Kumar Das is a politician from West Bengal. He is a member of the West Bengal Legislative Assembly, from Santipur Assembly constituency. He is a member of Bharatiya Janata Party.

== Personal Life and Education ==
Swapan Kumar Das was born to Netai Chandra Das. He is a resident of the Santipur region in Nadia. He completed his primary and secondary education locally before pursuing higher studies. He graduated with a Bachelor of Commerce (B.Com) from Santipur College in 1984. He later earned a B.Ed in Physical Education from Kalyani University in 1987. Before entering active politics, Das was a professional in the education sector and is currently listed as a retired teacher.

== Political career ==
Das has been an active member of the Bharatiya Janata Party. In the 2026 West Bengal Legislative Assembly election, he was nominated as the BJP candidate for the Santipur seat, a high-profile constituency known for its handloom industry and cultural heritage. He won the seat by defeating the incumbent MLA, Braja Kishore Goswami of the All India Trinamool Congress (AITC). His victory was part of a significant shift in the Nadia district during the 2026 election cycle. Election Results (2026)
