= Parthasarathi Chatterjee =

Indian politician

Member of the West Bengal Legislative Assembly
- Incumbent
- Assumed office 2 May 2021
- Preceded by: Shankar Singha
- Constituency: Ranaghat Uttar Paschim

Personal details
- Party: Bharatiya Janata Party
- Education: LLB
- Alma mater: University of Calcutta
- Profession: Business

Parthasarathi Chatterjee is an Indian politician from Bharatiya Janata Party. In May 2021, he was elected as a member of the West Bengal Legislative Assembly from Ranaghat Uttar Paschim (constituency). He defeated Shankar Singha of All India Trinamool Congress by 23,128 votes in 2021 West Bengal Assembly election.

Several BJP workers were attacked while protesting and alleging corruption in the central government's project Prime Minister's Housing Scheme and 100-day work. The BJP on 14 July 2021, blocked National Highway 12 (Near Ranaghat) to protest the arrest of no one so far. MLA Partha Sarathi Chatterjee and district BJP president Ashok Chakraborty were present at the blockade.
