= Santipur Assembly constituency =

Santipur
- Constituency No. 86 for the West Bengal Legislative Assembly
- Interactive Map Outlining Santipur Assembly Constituency

Constituency details
- Country: India
- Region: East India
- State: West Bengal
- District: Nadia
- Lok Sabha constituency: Ranaghat
- Established: 1951
- Total electors: 255,619
- Reservation: None

Member of Legislative Assembly
- 18th West Bengal Legislative Assembly
- Incumbent Swapan Kumar Das
- Party: Bharatiya Janata Party
- Elected year: 2026
- Preceded by: Braja Kishore Goswami

Santipur Assembly constituency is an assembly constituency in Nadia district in the Indian state of West Bengal.

Most Successful Parties from Santipur Assembly
1. Indian National Congress (9 times) (45.0%)
2. Revolutionary Communist Party of India (4 times) (20.0%)
3. Independent politician (2 times) (10.0%)
4. All India Trinamool Congress (2 times) (10.0%)
5. Bharatiya Janata Party (2 times) (10.0%)
6. Communist Party of India (Marxist) (1 time) (5.00%)

== Overview ==
As per orders of the Delimitation Commission, No. 86 Santipur Assembly constituency is composed of the following: Shantipur municipality, and Babla, Baganchra, Belgoria I, Belgoria II Gayeshpur and Haripur gram panchayats of the Shantipur community development block.

Santipur Assembly constituency is part of No. 13 Ranaghat (Lok Sabha constituency) (SC). It was earlier part of Nabadwip (Lok Sabha constituency).

== Members of the Legislative Assembly ==
Year	Member	Party
1951	Sashi Bhusan Khan	Indian National Congress
1957	Haridas Dey	Indian National Congress
1962	Kanai Pal	Independent politician
1967	Kanai Pal	Communist Party of India
1969	M. Mokshed Ali	Revolutionary Communist Party of India
1971	Bimalananda Mukherjee	Revolutionary Communist Party of India
1972	Asamanja De	Indian National Congress
1977	Bimalananda Mukherjee	Independent politician
1982	Bimalananda Mukherjee	Revolutionary Communist Party of India
1987	Bimalananda Mukherjee	Revolutionary Communist Party of India
1991	Ajoy Dey	Indian National Congress
1996	Ajoy Dey	Indian National Congress
2001	Ajoy Dey	Indian National Congress
2006	Ajoy Dey	Indian National Congress
2011	Ajoy Dey	Indian National Congress
2014^	Ajoy Dey	All India Trinamool Congress
2016	Arindam Bhattacharya	Indian National Congress
2021	Jagannath Sarkar	Bharatiya Janata Party
2021^	Braja Kishore Goswami	All India Trinamool Congress
2026	Swapan Kumar Das	Bharatiya Janata Party

- ^ = by-election

== Election results ==
Vote share of Winning candidates
2026	54.86%
2021 (by-poll)	55.39%
2021	49.94%
2016	51.76%
2014 (by-poll)	38.95%
2011	57.77%
2006	47.86%
2001	42.99%
1996	49.28%
1991	43.92%
1987	50.46%
1982	52.15%
1977	55.72%
1972	59.42%
1971	39.73%
1969	47.49%
1967	47.63%
1962	53.80%
1957	46.90%
1951	38.11%

=== 2026 ===
2026 West Bengal Legislative Assembly election: Santipur
Party	Candidate	Votes	%	±%
BJP	Swapan Kumar Das	117,941	54.86	▲4.92
AITC	Brajakishor Goswami	72,565	33.76	▼8.96
CPI(M)	Soumen Mahato	11,533	5.36	
Independent	Arindam Bhattacharya	7,216	3.36	
NOTA	None of the above	930	0.43	▼0.66
Majority		45,376	21.1	▲13.88
Turnout		214,973	94.32	▲8.37
BJP gain from AITC		Swing		

=== 2021 by-poll ===
2021 West Bengal Legislative Assembly election: Santipur
Party	Candidate	Votes	%	±%
AITC	Braja Kishor Goswami	112,087	55.39	
BJP	Niranjan Biswas	47,412	23.43	
CPI(M)	Soumen Mahato	39,958	19.75	
INC	Raju Pal	2,877	1.42	
Majority		64,675	31.96	
Turnout		202,334		
Swing to AITC from BJP		Swing		

=== 2021 ===
2021 West Bengal Legislative Assembly election: Santipur
Party	Candidate	Votes	%	±%
BJP	Jagannath Sarkar	109,722	49.94	
AITC	Ajoy Dey	93,844	42.72	
INC	Riju Ghoshal	9,848	4.48	
NOTA	None of the above	2,385	1.09	
Majority		15,878	7.22	
Turnout		219,692	85.95	
BJP gain from INC		Swing		

=== 2016 ===
In the 2016 elections, the 6-times MLA Ajoy Dey was defeated by the West Bengal State Youth Congress, President, Arindam Bhattacharya, who secured 103,566 (52.25%) votes, with a winning margin of 19,488 votes.

2016 West Bengal Legislative Assembly election: Santipur
Party	Candidate	Votes	%	±%
INC	Arindam Bhattacharya	103,566	51.76	
AITC	Ajoy Dey	84,078	42.02	
BJP	Swapan Kumar Dam	7,495	3.75	
Majority		19,488	9.74	
Turnout		2,00,178	88.83	
INC gain from AITC		Swing		

=== 2014 by-poll ===
A by-election was held on 12 April 2014 following the resignation of the sitting MLA, Ajoy Dey who switched over to Trinamool Congress from Congress.

By-election, 2014: Santipur
Party	Candidate	Votes	%	±%
AITC	Ajoy Dey	71,973	38.95	
CPI(M)	Anup Kumar Ghosh	51,838	28.05	
INC	Kumares Chakraborty	36,645	19.83	
BJP	Sufal Sarkar	24,324	13.16	
Majority		20,135	10.90	
Turnout		1,87,088	86.94	
AITC gain from INC		Swing		

=== 2011 ===
2011 West Bengal Legislative Assembly election: Santipur
Party	Candidate	Votes	%	±%
INC	Ajoy Dey	98,902	57.77	
RCPI	Iyar Mallik	60,744	35.48	
BJP	Kanoj Biswas	11,543	6.74	
Majority		38,158	22.29	
Turnout		171,189	89.80	
INC hold		Swing		

=== 2006 ===
2006 West Bengal Legislative Assembly election: Santipur
Party	Candidate	Votes	%	±%
INC	Ajoy Dey	89,769	47.86	
CPI(M)	Santanu Chakrabarti	87,361	46.57	
Independent	Ujjal Nandi	4,092	2.18	
BJP	Kanchan Maitra	4,029	2.15	
BSP	Amal Sarkar	2,327	1.24	
Majority		2,408	1.28	
Turnout		188,014		
INC hold		Swing		

=== 2001 ===
2001 West Bengal Legislative Assembly election: Santipur
Party	Candidate	Votes	%	±%
INC	Ajoy Dey	69,117	42.99	
Independent	Badal Basak	47,541	29.57	
BJP	Kumaresh Chakraborty	37,576	23.37	
RCPI	Asim Ghosh	6,527	4.06	
Majority		21,576	13.42	
Turnout		160,812	83.84	
INC hold		Swing		

=== 1996 ===
1996 West Bengal Legislative Assembly election: Santipur
Party	Candidate	Votes	%	±%
INC	Ajoy De	78,163	49.28	
RCPI	Bimalananda Mukherjee	67,793	42.74	
BJP	Malay Kumar Pramanick	11,622	7.33	
Independent	Manmohan Sarkar	829	0.52	
Independent	Sachindranath Bhattacharya	211	0.13	
Majority		10,370	6.54	
Turnout		163,000	88.77	
INC hold		Swing		

=== 1991 ===
1991 West Bengal Legislative Assembly election: Santipur
Party	Candidate	Votes	%	±%
INC	Ajoy Dey	56,107	43.92	
RCPI	Asim Ghosh	54,666	42.79	
BJP	Chittaranjan Kar	15,542	12.17	
BSP	Kshitish Chandra Mondal	983	0.77	
Independent	Sachinder Nath Bhattacharya	455	0.36	
Majority		1,441	1.13	
Turnout		131,378	84.45	
Swing to INC from Independent		Swing		

=== 1987 ===
1987 West Bengal Legislative Assembly election: Santipur
Party	Candidate	Votes	%	±%
Independent	Bimalananda Mukherjee	50,261	50.46	
INC	Ajay De	45,633	45.82	
Independent	Kesto Ghosh	2,734	2.75	
Independent	Mahabir Mukherjee	971	0.97	
Majority		4,628	4.64	
Turnout		101,297	81.63	
Independent hold		Swing		

=== 1982 ===
1982 West Bengal Legislative Assembly election: Santipur
Party	Candidate	Votes	%	±%
Independent	Bimalananda Mukherjee	42,525	52.15	
INC	Asamanja De	34,668	42.51	
Independent	Dilip Das (Pintoo)	4,357	5.34	
Majority		7,857	9.64	
Turnout		83,309	81.07	
Swing to Independent from RCPI		Swing		

=== 1977 ===
1977 West Bengal Legislative Assembly election: Santipur
Party	Candidate	Votes	%	±%
RCPI	Bimalananda Mukherjee	28,553	55.72	
JP	Jnanendra Nath Pramanik	14,371	28.04	
INC	Pulak Goswami	6,569	12.82	
Independent	Nirapada Basak	853	1.66	
Independent	Chintaharan Goswami	730	1.42	
Independent	Krishnendu Biswas	168	0.33	
Majority		14,182	27.68	
Turnout		52,298	62.01	
Swing to RCPI from INC		Swing		

=== 1972 ===
1972 West Bengal Legislative Assembly election: Santipur
Party	Candidate	Votes	%	±%
INC	Asamanja De	27,272	59.42	
RCPI	Bimalananda Mukherjee	18,626	40.58	
Majority		8,646	18.84	
Turnout		46,982	66.35	
Swing to INC from RCPI		Swing		

=== 1971 ===
1971 West Bengal Legislative Assembly election: Santipur
Party	Candidate	Votes	%	±%
RCPI	Bimalananda Mukherjee	16,818	39.73	
INC	Asaamanha De	16,530	39.05	
Independent	M. Makshed Ali	3,744	8.84	
Independent	Kanat Paul	2,920	6.90	
INC(O)	Jnanndra Nath Pramanik	1,807	4.27	
Independent	Ghosh Banajit Kumar	514	1.21	
Majority		288	0.68	
Turnout		45,445	61.52	
RCPI hold		Swing		

=== 1969 ===
1969 West Bengal Legislative Assembly election: Santipur
Party	Candidate	Votes	%	±%
RCPI	M. Makshed Ali	21,848	47.49	
INC	Haridas Day	19,400	42.17	
Independent	Kanai Pal	3,289	7.15	
NDF	Baswas Nagendra Nath	1,464	3.18	
Majority		2,448	5.32	
Turnout		47,094	69.26	
Swing to RCPI from CPI(M)		Swing		

=== 1967 ===
1967 West Bengal Legislative Assembly election: Santipur
Party	Candidate	Votes	%	±%
CPI(M)	K. Pal	20,695	47.63	
INC	H. Dey	16,577	38.15	
Independent	N. Goswami	4,223	9.72	
Independent	B. Pramanik	1,958	4.51	
Majority		4,118	9.48	
Turnout		46,920	69.85	
Swing to CPI(M) from Independent		Swing		

=== 1962 ===
1962 West Bengal Legislative Assembly election: Santipur
Party	Candidate	Votes	%	±%
Independent	Kanai Pal	26,553	53.80	
INC	Haridas Dey	17,400	35.26	
SBP	Bijan Kumar Chakravarti	5,399	10.94	
Majority		9,153	18.54	
Turnout		52,934	54.34	
Swing to Independent from INC		Swing		

=== 1957 ===
1957 West Bengal Legislative Assembly election: Santipur
Party	Candidate	Votes	%	±%
INC	Haridas Dey	17,180	46.90	
Independent	Kanai Pal	13,470	36.78	
Independent	Debesh Chandra Sinha	4,457	12.17	
Independent	Naran Goswami	1,521	4.15	
Majority		3,710	10.12	
Turnout		36,628	54.65	
INC hold		Swing		

=== 1951 ===
1951 West Bengal Legislative Assembly election: Santipur
Party	Candidate	Votes	%	±%
INC	Sashibhusan Khan	8,115	38.11	
RCPI	Kanai Pal	4,564	21.43	
KMPP	Biswanath Goswami	2,738	12.86	
ABJS	Sukumar Das	2,647	12.43	
Independent	Harkali Das	2,532	11.89	
Independent	Dhirananda Goswami	420	1.97	
Independent	Radhakanta Roy	279	1.31	
Majority		3,551	16.68	
Turnout		21,295	42.10	
INC win (new seat)				
