= Ranaghat Dakshin Assembly constituency =

Ranaghat Dakshin
- Constituency No. 90 for the West Bengal Legislative Assembly
- Interactive Map Outlining Ranaghat Dakshin Assembly Constituency

Constituency details
- Country: India
- Region: East India
- State: West Bengal
- District: Nadia
- Lok Sabha constituency: Ranaghat
- Established: 2011
- Total electors: 285,180
- Reservation: SC

Member of Legislative Assembly
- 18th West Bengal Legislative Assembly
- Incumbent Ashim Kumar Biswas
- Party: Bharatiya Janata Party

Ranaghat Dakshin is a Vidhan Sabha constituency in Nadia district in the Indian state of West Bengal. It is reserved for scheduled castes.

== Overview ==
As per orders of the Delimitation Commission, No. 90 Ranaghat Dakshin Assembly constituency (SC) is composed of the following: Anishmali, Baidyapur I, Baidyapur II, Debagram, Majher Gram, Nokari, Raghunathpur Hijuli I and Shyamnagar gram panchayats of Ranaghat II community development block, Anulia, Habibpur, Nawpara Masunda, Payradanga, Ramnagar II and Tarapur gram panchayats of Ranaghat I community development block and Cooper's Camp notified area.

Ranaghat Dakshin Assembly constituency (SC) is part of No. 13 Ranaghat (Lok Sabha constituency) (SC). Ranaghat East and West were earlier part of Nabadwip (Lok Sabha constituency).

== Members of the Legislative Assembly ==
=== Ranaghat ===
Year	Name	Party
1951	Bijoy Krishna Sarkar	Indian National Congress
1951	Keshab Chandra Mitra	Indian National Congress
1957	Benoy Kumar Chatterjee	Indian National Congress
1962	Gour Chandra Kundu	Communist Party of India

=== Ranaghat East ===
Year	Name	Party
1967	Nitai Pada Sarkar	Communist Party of India
1969	Nitai Pada Sarkar	Communist Party of India
1971	Naresh Chandra Biswas	Communist Party of India (Marxist)
1972	Nitaipada Sarkar	Communist Party of India
1977	Satish Chandra Biswas	Communist Party of India (Marxist)
1982	Satish Chandra Biswas	Communist Party of India (Marxist)
1987	Binay Krishna Biswas	Communist Party of India (Marxist)
1991	Binay Krishna Biswas	Communist Party of India (Marxist)
1996	Binay Krishna Biswas	Communist Party of India (Marxist)
2001	Asim Bala	Communist Party of India (Marxist)
2006	Debendra Nath Biswas	Communist Party of India (Marxist)

=== Ranaghat West ===
Year	Name	Party
1967	Benoy Kumar Chatterjee	Indian National Congress
1969	Gour Chandra Kundu	Communist Party of India (Marxist)
1971	Gour Chandra Kundu	Communist Party of India (Marxist)
1977	Gour Chandra Kundu	Communist Party of India (Marxist)
1972	Naresh Chandra Chaki	Indian National Congress
1982	Gour Chandra Kundu	Communist Party of India (Marxist)
1987	Gour Chandra Kundu	Communist Party of India (Marxist)
1991	Subhaas Basu	Communist Party of India (Marxist)
1996	Shankar Singha	Indian National Congress
2001	Shankar Singha	Indian National Congress
2006	Aloke Kumar Das	Communist Party of India (Marxist)

=== Ranaghat Dakshin ===
Year	Name	Party
2011	Abir Biswas	All India Trinamool Congress
2016	Rama Biswas	Communist Party of India (Marxist)
2021	Mukut Mani Adhikari	Bharatiya Janata Party
2024^	Mukut Mani Adhikari	All India Trinamool Congress
2026	Ashim Kumar Biswas	Bharatiya Janata Party

- ^ = by-election

== Election results ==
=== 2026 ===
2026 West Bengal Legislative Assembly election: Ranaghat Dakshin
Party	Candidate	Votes	%	±%
BJP	Ashim Kumar Biswas	140,010	60.17	
AITC	Sougata Kumar Burman	75,546	32.47	
CPI(M)	Arindam Biswas	10,714	4.6	
NOTA	None of the above	1,223	0.53	−0.12
Majority		64,464	27.7	+20.87
Turnout		232,685	91.54	+6.79
BJP hold		Swing		

=== 2024 bypoll ===
2024 West Bengal Legislative Assembly by-election: Ranaghat Dakshin
Party	Candidate	Votes	%	±%
AITC	Mukut Mani Adhikari	113,533	55.08	▲12.56
BJP	Manoj Kumar Biswas	74,485	36.13	▼13.21
CPI(M)	Arindam Biswas	13,082	6.35	▲0.09
Independent	Bankim Mondal	1,307	0.63	▲0.63
NOTA	None of the above	1,351	0.66	▲0.01
Majority		39,048	18.95	
Turnout				
AITC gain from BJP		Swing		

=== 2021 ===
2021 West Bengal Legislative Assembly election: Ranaghat Dakshin
Party	Candidate	Votes	%	±%
BJP	Mukut Mani Adhikari	119,260	49.34	
AITC	Barnali Dey Roy	102,745	42.51	
CPI(M)	Rama Biswas	15,124	6.26	
NOTA	None of the above	1,577	0.65	
Majority		16,515	6.83	
Turnout		241,687	84.75	
BJP gain from CPI(M)		Swing		

=== 2016 ===
In the 2016 election, Rama Biswas of CPI(M) defeated his nearest rival Abir Ranjan Biswas of AITC.

West Bengal assembly elections, 2016: Ranaghat Dakshin (SC) constituency
Party	Candidate	Votes	%	±%
CPI(M)	Rama Biswas	104,159	47.51	+6.38
AITC	Abir Ranjan Biswas	86,906	39.64	−11.59
BJP	Susmit Ranjan Haldar	18,114	8.26	+3.66
NOTA	None of the above	3,640	1.66	+1.66
BSP	Prashanta Biswas	2,407	1.10	−0.42
Turnout		2,19,215	85.03	−2.52
CPI(M) gain from AITC		Swing	-1.20	

.# Swing calculated on Congress+Trinamool Congress vote percentages taken together, as well as CPI(M)'s vote percentage, in 2006 for the Ranaghat West seat.

=== 2011 ===
In the 2011 election, Abir Ranjan Biswas of Trinamool Congress defeated his nearest rival Aloke Das of CPI(M).

West Bengal assembly elections, 2011: Ranaghat Dakshin (SC) constituency
Party	Candidate	Votes	%	±%
AITC	Abir Ranjan Biswas	99,432	51.23	−2.65
CPI(M)	Aloke Das	79,824	41.13	−1.45
BJP	Benoy Bhusan Roy	8,934	4.60	
BSP	Prashanta Biswas	2,951		
Nirjatita Samaj Biplabi Party	Chaitanya Barai	2,942		
Turnout		194,083	87.55	
AITC gain from CPI(M)		Swing	-1.20	

.# Swing calculated on Congress+Trinamool Congress vote percentages taken together, as well as CPI(M)'s vote percentage, in 2006 for the Ranaghat West seat.

=== 1962 ===
In 1962 and 1957, there was a single seat for Ranaghat. Gour Chandra Kundu of CPI won in 1962. Benoy Kumar Chatterjee of Congress won in 1957. In independent India's first election in 1951, Ranaghat was a joint seat. Bijoy Krishna Sarkar and Keshab Chandra Mitra won the Ranaghat seat.

=== 1972 ===
==== Ranaghat East ====
Nitaipada Sarkar of CPI won in 1972. Naresh Chandra Biswas of CPI(M) won in 1971. Nitai Pada Sarkar of CPI won in 1969 and 1967.

==== Ranaghat West ====
Naresh Chandra Chaki of Congress won in 1972. Gour Chandra Kundu of CPI(M) 1971 and 1969. Benoy Kumar Chatterjee of Congress won in 1967.
