= Jagannath Sarkar (BJP politician) =

Indian politician

Member of Parliament, Lok Sabha
- Incumbent
- Assumed office 23 May 2019
- Preceded by: Tapas Mandal
- Constituency: Ranaghat

Personal details
- Born: 2 January 1963 (age 63) Bankura, West Bengal, India
- Party: Bharatiya Janata Party
- Children: 2
- Education: Bachelor of Education
- Alma mater: Kalyani University
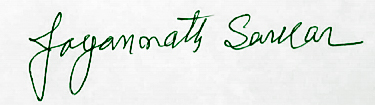
- Signature

Jagannath Sarkar (born 2 January 1963) is an Indian politician from West Bengal. He is a two time Member of Lok Sabha for Ranaghat Lok Sabha constituency. He won in the 2019 Indian general election in West Bengal and retained the seat in 2024 representing the Bharatiya Janata Party. In between, he won the Santipur Assembly seat in 2021 election but resigned his assembly seat and retained the MP seat.

== Early life and education ==
Sarkar was born on 2 January 1963 to Bhim Chandra Sarkar and Nani Bala Sarkar in Tashuli village of Bankura district, West Bengal. He graduated with Bachelor of Arts from Santipur College in 1984 and Bachelor of Physical Education degree from Kalyani University in 1986-1987. He married Arpita Sarkar (Baidya) on 2 November 1999, and together they have a son and a daughter. He was a teacher in Vidyamandir School in Fulia and others. He was also a farmer by profession.

== Career ==
Sarkar is the general secretary of the Nadia district unit of the Bharatiya Janata Party. On 10 April 2019, the party nominated him for the 2019 Indian general election from the Ranaghat constituency, after the nomination of Mukut Mani Adhikari was rejected. On 23 May, he was elected to the Lok Sabha after defeating his nearest rival, Rupali Biswas of the Trinamool Congress.

He contested and won the 2021 West Bengal Legislative Assembly election from Santipur Assembly constituency but later resigned the MLA seat and retained the MP seat from Ranaghat. He defeated Ajoy Dey of the Trinamool Congress by a margin of 15,878 votes. In the 2024 Indian general election in West Bengal, he retained the Ranaghat Lok Sabha constituency defeating Mukut Mani Adhikari of the Trinamool Congress by a margin of 186,899 votes.
