= Ranaghat Uttar Paschim Assembly constituency =

Ranaghat Uttar Paschim
- Constituency No. 87 for the West Bengal Legislative Assembly
- Interactive Map Outlining Ranaghat Uttar Paschim Assembly Constituency

Constituency details
- Country: India
- Region: East India
- State: West Bengal
- District: Nadia
- Lok Sabha constituency: Ranaghat
- Established: 1951
- Total electors: 265,846
- Reservation: None

Member of Legislative Assembly
- 18th West Bengal Legislative Assembly
- Incumbent Parthasarathi Chatterjee
- Party: BJP
- Alliance: NDA
- Elected year: 2026

Ranaghat Uttar Paschim Assembly constituency is an assembly constituency in Nadia district in the Indian state of West Bengal.

== Overview ==
As per orders of the Delimitation Commission, No. 87 Ranaghat Uttar Paschim Assembly constituency is composed of the following: Ranaghat municipality, Taherpur notified area, Birnagar municipality, and Ramnagar I, Barasat, Kalinarayanpur-Paharpur and Khisma gram panchayats of Ranaghat I community development block, and Arbandi I and Arbandi II gram panchayats of Santipur community development block, and Fulia Township.

Ranaghat Uttar Paschim Assembly constituency is part of No. 13 Ranaghat (Lok Sabha constituency) (SC). Ranaghat East and West were earlier part of Nabadwip (Lok Sabha constituency).

== Members of the Legislative Assembly ==
=== Ranaghat ===
Year	Name	Party
1951	Bijoy Krishna Sarkar	Indian National Congress
1951	Keshab Chandra Mitra	Indian National Congress
1957	Benoy Kumar Chatterjee	Indian National Congress
1962	Gour Chandra Kundu	Communist Party of India

=== Ranaghat East ===
Year	Name	Party
1967	Nitai Pada Sarkar	Communist Party of India
1969	Nitai Pada Sarkar	Communist Party of India
1971	Naresh Chandra Biswas	Communist Party of India (Marxist)
1972	Nitaipada Sarkar	Communist Party of India
1977	Satish Chandra Biswas	Communist Party of India (Marxist)
1982	Satish Chandra Biswas	Communist Party of India (Marxist)
1987	Binay Krishna Biswas	Communist Party of India (Marxist)
1991	Binay Krishna Biswas	Communist Party of India (Marxist)
1996	Binay Krishna Biswas	Communist Party of India (Marxist)
2001	Asim Bala	Communist Party of India (Marxist)
2006	Debendra Nath Biswas	Communist Party of India (Marxist)

=== Ranaghat West ===
Year	Name	Party
1967	Benoy Kumar Chatterjee	Indian National Congress
1969	Gour Chandra Kundu	Communist Party of India (Marxist)
1971	Gour Chandra Kundu	Communist Party of India (Marxist)
1972	Naresh Chandra Chaki	Indian National Congress
1977	Gour Chandra Kundu	Communist Party of India (Marxist)
1982	Gour Chandra Kundu	Communist Party of India (Marxist)
1987	Gour Chandra Kundu	Communist Party of India (Marxist)
1991	Subhaas Basu	Communist Party of India (Marxist)
1996	Shankar Singha	Indian National Congress
2001	Shankar Singha	Indian National Congress
2006	Aloke Kumar Das	Communist Party of India (Marxist)

=== Ranaghat Uttar Paschim ===
Year	Name	Party
2011	Parthasarathi Chatterjee	All India Trinamool Congress
2016	Shankar Singha	Indian National Congress
2021	Parthasarathi Chatterjee	Bharatiya Janata Party
2026	Parthasarathi Chatterjee	Bharatiya Janata Party

== Election results ==
=== 2026 ===
2026 West Bengal Legislative Assembly election: Ranaghat Uttar Paschim
Party	Candidate	Votes	%	±%
BJP	Parthasarathi Chatterjee	129,046	59.43	+8.52
AITC	Tapas Ghosh	71,495	32.93	−7.62
CPI(M)	Debasish Chakraborty (Debu)	10,280	4.73	
NOTA	None of the above	1,842	0.85	−0.16
Majority		57,551	26.5	+16.14
Turnout		217,135	93.06	+9.1
BJP hold		Swing		

=== 2021 ===
2021 West Bengal Legislative Assembly election: Ranaghat Uttar Paschim
Party	Candidate	Votes	%	±%
BJP	Parthasarathi Chatterjee	113,637	50.91	+46.0
AITC	Sankar Singha	90,509	40.55	
INC	Bijoyendu Biswas	10,345	4.64	+49.46
NOTA	None of the above	2,258	1.01	
Majority		23,128	10.36	
Turnout		223,193	83.96	
BJP gain from INC		Swing		

=== 2016 ===
In the 2016 election, Sankar Singha of Congress defeated his nearest rival Parthasarathi Chatterjee of AITC.

West Bengal assembly elections, 2016: Ranaghat Uttar Paschim constituency
Party	Candidate	Votes	%	±%
INC	Shankar Singha	101,608	54.41	+7.88#
AITC	Parthasarathi Chatterjee	81,395	54.41	+7.88#
CPI(M)	Meena Bhattacharya	14,051	39.74	−10.59#
BJP	Anal Biswas (Politician)	10225	4.94	
BSP	Sulata Roy (Pramanik)	4,122	2.21	
Turnout		186,337	88.38	
INC gain from AITC		Swing	+18.47#	

# Swing calculated on Congress+Trinamool Congress vote percentages taken together, as well as CPI(M)'s vote percentage, in 2006 for the Ranaghat East seat.

=== 2011 ===
In the 2011 election, Partha Sarathi Chatterjee of Trinamool Congress defeated his nearest rival Meena Bhattacharya of CPI(M).

West Bengal assembly elections, 2011: Ranaghat Uttar Paschim constituency
Party	Candidate	Votes	%	±%
AITC	Parthasarathi Chatterjee	101,395	54.41	+7.88#
CPI(M)	Meena Bhattacharya	74,051	39.74	−10.59#
BJP	Megh Lal Karmaker	6,769	3.63	
BSP	Sulata Roy (Pramanik)	4,122	2.21	
Turnout		186,337	88.38	
AITC gain from CPI(M)		Swing	+18.47#	

.# Swing calculated on Congress+Trinamool Congress vote percentages taken together, as well as CPI(M)'s vote percentage, in 2006 for the Ranaghat East seat.

=== 1962 ===
In 1962 and 1957, there was a single seat for Ranaghat. Gour Chandra Kundu of CPI won in 1962. Benoy Kumar Chatterjee of Congress won in 1957. In independent India's first election in 1951, Ranaghat was a joint seat. Bijoy Krishna Sarkar and Keshab Chandra Mitra, both of Congress, won the Ranaghat seat.

=== 1972 ===
==== Ranaghat East ====
Nitaipada Sarkar of CPI won in 1972. Naresh Chandra Biswas of CPI(M) won in 1971. Nitai Pada Sarkar of CPI won in 1969 and 1967.

==== Ranaghat West ====
Naresh Chandra Chaki of Congress won in 1972. Gour Chandra Kundu of CPI(M) 1971 and 1969. Benoy Kumar Chatterjee of Congress won in 1967.
