= Arindam Bhattacharya (politician) =

Indian politician, researcher, writer

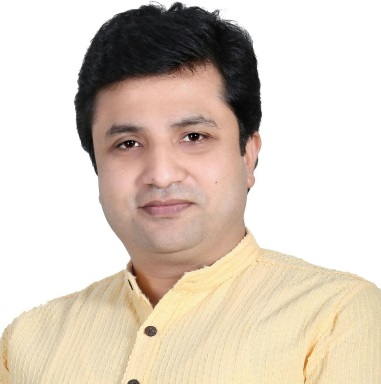

Member of the West Bengal Legislative Assembly
- In office 2016–2021
- Constituency: Santipur

Personal details
- Born: 28 January 1980 (age 46) Kolkata, West Bengal
- Party: Independent (2026-present)Bharatiya Janata Party (2021-2026)
- Other political affiliations: All India Trinamool Congress (2017-2021); Indian National Congress (2001–2017)
- Education: Maastricht University - EPRM Post Graduate Programme participation in Spring 2017, obtained modular certificates for Module 1, 2 and 3; University of Turin – LL.M.
- Occupation: Politician
- Profession: Lawyer, Researcher, Writer, Social Entrepreneur

Arindam Bhattacharya (born 28 January 1980) is an Indian politician who is an MLA from the Indian state of West Bengal and Former President of West Bengal State Youth Congress. By profession he is a corporate and International Trade lawyer, a researcher, writer and social entrepreneur. Apart from being a legislator he is associated with many International organizations like the Parliamentarians for Global Action (PGA), GLOBE International and the United Nations Civil Society, where he is doing strong advocacy for democracy, civil rights and sustainable development. He is a former member of the West Bengal Legislative Assembly.

- Independent Candidate for 86 santipur constituency in West Bengal legislative assembly election 2026*

== Political career ==
He represents the Santipur (Vidhan Sabha constituency).
