= Srutisekhar Goswami =

Indian politician (born 1973)

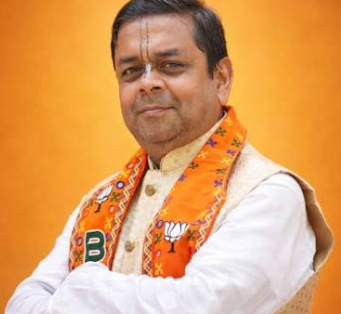

Member of the West Bengal Legislative Assembly
- Incumbent
- Assumed office 4 May 2026
- Preceded by: Pundarikakhsa Saha
- Constituency: Nabadwip

Personal details
- Party: Bharatiya Janata Party
- Profession: Politician

Srutisekhar Goswami (born 1973) is an Indian politician from West Bengal. He is a member of the West Bengal Legislative Assembly from Nabadwip Assembly constituency in Nadia district, representing the Bharatiya Janata Party.

== Early life and education ==
Goswami is from Nabadwip, Nadia district, West Bengal. He is the son of the late Gour Haridas Goswami. He completed his MA in political science at Netaji Subhash Open University in 2007 and his Bachelor of Law in 2002 at Chotanagpur Law College which is affiliated with Ranchi University. He is an advocate and a spiritual speaker. He declared assets worth Rs.65 lakhs in his affidavit to the Election Commission of India.

== Career ==
Goswami won the Nabadwip Assembly constituency representing the Bharatiya Janata Party in the 2026 West Bengal Legislative Assembly election. He polled 1,08,631 votes and defeated his nearest rival, Pundarikakshya Saha of the All India Trinamool Congress, by a margin of 21,444 votes.

== See also ==
- 2026 West Bengal Legislative Assembly election
- List of chief ministers of West Bengal
- West Bengal Legislative Assembly
- 18th West Bengal Assembly
