= Ashim Kumar Biswas =

Indian politician (born 1970)

Ashim Kumar Biswas (born 1970) is an Indian politician from West Bengal. He was elected in May 2026 as a member of the West Bengal Legislative Assembly from the Ranaghat Dakshin Assembly constituency, which is reserved for Scheduled Caste community in Nadia district, representing the Bharatiya Janata Party.

== Early life and education ==
Biswas is from Ranaghat, Nadia district, West Bengal. He is the son of the late Bharat Chandra Biswas. He studied till Class 12 at Gopal Nagar Haripada Institution, North 24 Parganas and passed the higher secondary examinations in 1987. He runs his own business and declared assets worth Rs.14 crore in his affidavit to the Election Commission of India.

== Career ==
Biswas won the Ranaghat Dakshin Assembly constituency representing the Bharatiya Janata Party in the 2026 West Bengal Legislative Assembly election. He polled 1,40,010 votes and defeated his nearest rival, Sougata Kumar Burman of the All India Trinamool Congress, by a margin of 64,464 votes.
