= Abir Biswas =

Indian politician

MP of Rajya Sabha
- In office 3 April 2018 – 2 April 2024
- Preceded by: Mukul Roy, AITC
- Succeeded by: Sagarika Ghose
- Parliamentary group: All India Trinamool Congress
- Constituency: West Bengal

Member of the West Bengal Legislative Assembly
- In office 2011–2016
- Preceded by: Debendra Nath Biswas and Aloke Kumar Das
- Succeeded by: Rama Biswas
- Constituency: Ranaghat Dakshin

Abir Ranjan Biswas is an Indian politician who served as a member of parliament in the Rajya Sabha for West Bengal from 2018 to 2024 Biswas is a member of the All India Trinamool Congress.
