= Ranaghat Lok Sabha constituency =

Lok Sabha constituency in West Bengal

Coordinates: 23°11′N 88°35′E

Ranaghat WB-13
- Lok Sabha constituency
- Interactive Map Outlining Ranaghat Lok Sabha Constituency

Constituency details
- Country: India
- Region: East India
- State: West Bengal
- Assembly constituencies: Nabadwip; Santipur; Ranaghat Uttar Paschim; Krishnaganj; Ranaghat Uttar Purba; Ranaghat Dakshin; Chakdaha
- Established: 2009
- Total electors: 18,71,658 (2024)
- Reservation: SC

Member of Parliament
- 18th Lok Sabha
- Incumbent Jagannath Sarkar
- Party: Bharatiya Janata Party
- Alliance: NDA
- Elected year: 2024

Ranaghat Lok Sabha constituency is one of the 543 parliamentary constituencies in India. The constituency is in Nadia district in West Bengal. As per order of the Delimitation Commission in respect of the boundary delimitation of constituencies in the West Bengal, from 2009 Nabadwip Lok Sabha constituency ceased to exist and a new one came into being: Ranaghat Lok Sabha constituency. All seven assembly segments of No. 13 Ranaghat Lok Sabha constituency are in Nadia district.

== Assembly segments ==
Parliamentary constituencies in West Bengal - 1. Cooch Behar, 2. Alipurduars, 3. Jalpaiguri, 4. Darjeeling, 5. Raiganj, 6. Balurghat, 7. Maldaha Uttar, 8. Maldaha Dakshin, 9. Jangipur, 10. Baharampur, 11. Murshidabad, 12. Krishnanagar, 13. Ranaghat, 14. Bangaon, 15. Barrackpore, 16. Dum Dum, 17. Barasat, 18. Basirhat, 19. Jaynagar, 20. Mathurapur, 21. Diamond Harbour, 22. Jadavpur, 23. Kolkata Dakshin, 24. Kolkata Uttar, 25. Howrah, 26. Uluberia, 27. Serampore, 28. Hooghly, 29. Arambagh, 30. Tamluk, 31, Kanthi, 32. Ghatal, 33. Jhargram, 34. Medinipur, 35. Purulia, 36. Bankura, 37. Bishnupur, 38. Bardhaman Purba, 39. Bardhaman Durgapur, 40. Asansol, 41. Bolpur, 42. Birbhum

Ranaghat (SC) Lok Sabha constituency (parliamentary constituency no. 13) is composed of the following assembly segments:

#	Name	District	Member	Party	2024 Lead
84	Nabadwip	Nadia	Srutisekhar Goswami	BJP	AITC
86	Santipur	Nadia	Swapan Kumar Das	BJP	BJP
87	Ranaghat Uttar Paschim	Nadia	Parthasarathi Chatterjee	BJP	BJP
88	Krishnaganj (SC)	Nadia	Sukanta Biswas	BJP	BJP
89	Ranaghat Uttar Purba (SC)	Nadia	Ashim Biswas	BJP	BJP
90	Ranaghat Dakshin (SC)	Nadia	Ashim Kumar Biswas	BJP	BJP
91	Chakdaha	Nadia	Bankim Chandra Ghosh	BJP	BJP

== Members of Parliament ==
Year	Member	Party
Before 2009 : See Nabadwip Lok Sabha constituency
2009	Sucharu Ranjan Haldar	Trinamool Congress
2014	Tapas Mandal	Trinamool Congress
2019	Jagannath Sarkar	Bharatiya Janata Party
2024	Jagannath Sarkar	Bharatiya Janata Party

== Election results ==
=== General Election 2024 ===
2024 Indian general election: Ranaghat
Party	Candidate	Votes	%	±%
BJP	Jagannath Sarkar	782,396	50.78	▼2.00
AITC	Mukut Mani Adhikari	595,497	38.65	▲1.60
CPI(M)	Alokesh Das	123,810	8.04	▲1.45
BSP	Biplab Biswas	9,392	0.61	New
SUCI(C)	Paresh Haldar	8,239	0.53	New
Independent	Jagannath Sarkar	5,861	0.38	New
Independent	Shyamal Kumar Mallick	5,544	0.36	New
None of the Above	NOTA	9,893	0.64	▲0.02
Majority		186,899	12.13	▼3.58
Turnout		1,540,632	81.87	▼2.39
BJP hold		Swing		

=== General Election 2019 ===
2019 Indian general elections: Ranaghat
Party	Candidate	Votes	%	±%
BJP	Jagannath Sarkar	783,254	52.78	+35.73
AITC	Rupali Biswas	5,49,825	37.05	−6.58
CPI(M)	Rama Biswas	97,771	6.59	−22.13
INC	Minati Biswas	23,297	1.57	−4.81
NOTA	None of the above	9,137	0.62	
Majority		233,428	15.71	
Turnout		1,484,797	84.26	
BJP gain from AITC		Swing		

=== General election 2014 ===
2014 Indian general elections: Ranaghat
Party	Candidate	Votes	%	±%
AITC	Tapas Mandal	5,90,451	43.63	−6.49
CPI(M)	Archana Biswas	3,88,684	28.72	−12.52
BJP	Dr. Suprabhat Biswas	2,33,670	17.27	+12.23
INC	Pratap Kanti Ray	92,218	6.81	N/A
BSP	Utpala Biswas	9,116	0.67	−1.01
Independent	Subhas Chandra Sarkar	8,658	0.63	N/A
SUCI(C)	Paresh Halder	7,952	0.58	N/A
RPI(A)	Nadiyar Chand Mondal	3,992	0.29	N/A
Nirjatita Samaj Biplabi Party	Chaitanya Barai	3,829	0.28	N/A
None of the Above	None of the Above	14,626	1.08	N/A
Majority		2,01,767	14.91	+7.51
Turnout		13,53,196	84.42	−1.88
AITC hold		Swing	-6.49	

=== General election 2009 ===
General Election, 2009: Ranaghat
Party	Candidate	Votes	%	±%
AITC	Sucharu Ranjan Haldar	575,058	50.12	
CPI(M)	Basudeb Barman	473,235	41.24	
BJP	Sukalyan Ray	84,404		
BSP	Satish Chandra Biswas	19,347	1.68	
Independent	Manmatha Biswas	12,159	1.05	
Independent	Nadiar Chand Mondal	9,585	0.83	
Majority		1,01,823	8.88	
Turnout		11,47,245	86.30	
AITC win (new seat)				

== See also ==
- List of constituencies of the Lok Sabha
