= Seal (Unicode block) =

- Range: U+3D000..U+3FC3F (11,328 code points)
- Plane: TIP
- Scripts: Small Seal
- Assigned: 11,328 code points
- Unused: 0 reserved code points

Unicode Version History
- 18.0 (2026): 11,328 (+11,328)

Unicode documentation
- Code chart ∣ Web page

Seal, also called Small Seal, is a Unicode block covering the seal script character repertoire of the Han dynasty dictionary Shuowen Jiezi, i.e. small seal script, Guwen, and Zhouwen.

== Structure ==
Characters are arranged according to Shuowen Jiezi radicals, in contrast to CJK Unified Ideographs, which are arranged according to Kangxi radicals. Also in contrast to CJK Unified Ideographs, the concept of a residual stroke count is not applicable to seal script, and is not included. However, the first character of each radical group is always the radical itself.

Like CJK Unified Ideographs, multiple reference glyphs may be shown per character: characters have up to four reference glyphs, respectively sourced from or consistent with the Shuowen Jiezi recensions by Xu Xuan (in two editions), Xu Kai, and Duan Yucai.

Each character is cross-referenced to the closest corresponding CJK Unified Ideograph (i.e. a liding or libian). For variant characters with no corresponding CJK Unified Ideograph, the CJK Unified Ideograph corresponding to the variant which Shuowen Jiezi denotes as "standard seal script" (Chinese: 正篆; pinyin: zhèngzhuàn) is referenced.

== Block ==
Small Seal^{[1]} Official Unicode Consortium code chart (PDF)
	0	1	2	3	4	5	6	7	8	9	A	B	C	D	E	F
U+3D00x	𽀀	𽀁	𽀂	𽀃	𽀄	𽀅	𽀆	𽀇	𽀈	𽀉	𽀊	𽀋	𽀌	𽀍	𽀎	𽀏
U+3D01x	𽀐	𽀑	𽀒	𽀓	𽀔	𽀕	𽀖	𽀗	𽀘	𽀙	𽀚	𽀛	𽀜	𽀝	𽀞	𽀟
U+3D02x	𽀠	𽀡	𽀢	𽀣	𽀤	𽀥	𽀦	𽀧	𽀨	𽀩	𽀪	𽀫	𽀬	𽀭	𽀮	𽀯
U+3D03x	𽀰	𽀱	𽀲	𽀳	𽀴	𽀵	𽀶	𽀷	𽀸	𽀹	𽀺	𽀻	𽀼	𽀽	𽀾	𽀿
U+3D04x	𽁀	𽁁	𽁂	𽁃	𽁄	𽁅	𽁆	𽁇	𽁈	𽁉	𽁊	𽁋	𽁌	𽁍	𽁎	𽁏
U+3D05x	𽁐	𽁑	𽁒	𽁓	𽁔	𽁕	𽁖	𽁗	𽁘	𽁙	𽁚	𽁛	𽁜	𽁝	𽁞	𽁟
U+3D06x	𽁠	𽁡	𽁢	𽁣	𽁤	𽁥	𽁦	𽁧	𽁨	𽁩	𽁪	𽁫	𽁬	𽁭	𽁮	𽁯
U+3D07x	𽁰	𽁱	𽁲	𽁳	𽁴	𽁵	𽁶	𽁷	𽁸	𽁹	𽁺	𽁻	𽁼	𽁽	𽁾	𽁿
U+3D08x	𽂀	𽂁	𽂂	𽂃	𽂄	𽂅	𽂆	𽂇	𽂈	𽂉	𽂊	𽂋	𽂌	𽂍	𽂎	𽂏
U+3D09x	𽂐	𽂑	𽂒	𽂓	𽂔	𽂕	𽂖	𽂗	𽂘	𽂙	𽂚	𽂛	𽂜	𽂝	𽂞	𽂟
U+3D0Ax	𽂠	𽂡	𽂢	𽂣	𽂤	𽂥	𽂦	𽂧	𽂨	𽂩	𽂪	𽂫	𽂬	𽂭	𽂮	𽂯
U+3D0Bx	𽂰	𽂱	𽂲	𽂳	𽂴	𽂵	𽂶	𽂷	𽂸	𽂹	𽂺	𽂻	𽂼	𽂽	𽂾	𽂿
U+3D0Cx	𽃀	𽃁	𽃂	𽃃	𽃄	𽃅	𽃆	𽃇	𽃈	𽃉	𽃊	𽃋	𽃌	𽃍	𽃎	𽃏
U+3D0Dx	𽃐	𽃑	𽃒	𽃓	𽃔	𽃕	𽃖	𽃗	𽃘	𽃙	𽃚	𽃛	𽃜	𽃝	𽃞	𽃟
U+3D0Ex	𽃠	𽃡	𽃢	𽃣	𽃤	𽃥	𽃦	𽃧	𽃨	𽃩	𽃪	𽃫	𽃬	𽃭	𽃮	𽃯
U+3D0Fx	𽃰	𽃱	𽃲	𽃳	𽃴	𽃵	𽃶	𽃷	𽃸	𽃹	𽃺	𽃻	𽃼	𽃽	𽃾	𽃿
U+3D10x	𽄀	𽄁	𽄂	𽄃	𽄄	𽄅	𽄆	𽄇	𽄈	𽄉	𽄊	𽄋	𽄌	𽄍	𽄎	𽄏
U+3D11x	𽄐	𽄑	𽄒	𽄓	𽄔	𽄕	𽄖	𽄗	𽄘	𽄙	𽄚	𽄛	𽄜	𽄝	𽄞	𽄟
U+3D12x	𽄠	𽄡	𽄢	𽄣	𽄤	𽄥	𽄦	𽄧	𽄨	𽄩	𽄪	𽄫	𽄬	𽄭	𽄮	𽄯
U+3D13x	𽄰	𽄱	𽄲	𽄳	𽄴	𽄵	𽄶	𽄷	𽄸	𽄹	𽄺	𽄻	𽄼	𽄽	𽄾	𽄿
U+3D14x	𽅀	𽅁	𽅂	𽅃	𽅄	𽅅	𽅆	𽅇	𽅈	𽅉	𽅊	𽅋	𽅌	𽅍	𽅎	𽅏
U+3D15x	𽅐	𽅑	𽅒	𽅓	𽅔	𽅕	𽅖	𽅗	𽅘	𽅙	𽅚	𽅛	𽅜	𽅝	𽅞	𽅟
U+3D16x	𽅠	𽅡	𽅢	𽅣	𽅤	𽅥	𽅦	𽅧	𽅨	𽅩	𽅪	𽅫	𽅬	𽅭	𽅮	𽅯
U+3D17x	𽅰	𽅱	𽅲	𽅳	𽅴	𽅵	𽅶	𽅷	𽅸	𽅹	𽅺	𽅻	𽅼	𽅽	𽅾	𽅿
U+3D18x	𽆀	𽆁	𽆂	𽆃	𽆄	𽆅	𽆆	𽆇	𽆈	𽆉	𽆊	𽆋	𽆌	𽆍	𽆎	𽆏
U+3D19x	𽆐	𽆑	𽆒	𽆓	𽆔	𽆕	𽆖	𽆗	𽆘	𽆙	𽆚	𽆛	𽆜	𽆝	𽆞	𽆟
U+3D1Ax	𽆠	𽆡	𽆢	𽆣	𽆤	𽆥	𽆦	𽆧	𽆨	𽆩	𽆪	𽆫	𽆬	𽆭	𽆮	𽆯
U+3D1Bx	𽆰	𽆱	𽆲	𽆳	𽆴	𽆵	𽆶	𽆷	𽆸	𽆹	𽆺	𽆻	𽆼	𽆽	𽆾	𽆿
U+3D1Cx	𽇀	𽇁	𽇂	𽇃	𽇄	𽇅	𽇆	𽇇	𽇈	𽇉	𽇊	𽇋	𽇌	𽇍	𽇎	𽇏
U+3D1Dx	𽇐	𽇑	𽇒	𽇓	𽇔	𽇕	𽇖	𽇗	𽇘	𽇙	𽇚	𽇛	𽇜	𽇝	𽇞	𽇟
U+3D1Ex	𽇠	𽇡	𽇢	𽇣	𽇤	𽇥	𽇦	𽇧	𽇨	𽇩	𽇪	𽇫	𽇬	𽇭	𽇮	𽇯
U+3D1Fx	𽇰	𽇱	𽇲	𽇳	𽇴	𽇵	𽇶	𽇷	𽇸	𽇹	𽇺	𽇻	𽇼	𽇽	𽇾	𽇿
U+3D20x	𽈀	𽈁	𽈂	𽈃	𽈄	𽈅	𽈆	𽈇	𽈈	𽈉	𽈊	𽈋	𽈌	𽈍	𽈎	𽈏
U+3D21x	𽈐	𽈑	𽈒	𽈓	𽈔	𽈕	𽈖	𽈗	𽈘	𽈙	𽈚	𽈛	𽈜	𽈝	𽈞	𽈟
U+3D22x	𽈠	𽈡	𽈢	𽈣	𽈤	𽈥	𽈦	𽈧	𽈨	𽈩	𽈪	𽈫	𽈬	𽈭	𽈮	𽈯
U+3D23x	𽈰	𽈱	𽈲	𽈳	𽈴	𽈵	𽈶	𽈷	𽈸	𽈹	𽈺	𽈻	𽈼	𽈽	𽈾	𽈿
U+3D24x	𽉀	𽉁	𽉂	𽉃	𽉄	𽉅	𽉆	𽉇	𽉈	𽉉	𽉊	𽉋	𽉌	𽉍	𽉎	𽉏
U+3D25x	𽉐	𽉑	𽉒	𽉓	𽉔	𽉕	𽉖	𽉗	𽉘	𽉙	𽉚	𽉛	𽉜	𽉝	𽉞	𽉟
U+3D26x	𽉠	𽉡	𽉢	𽉣	𽉤	𽉥	𽉦	𽉧	𽉨	𽉩	𽉪	𽉫	𽉬	𽉭	𽉮	𽉯
U+3D27x	𽉰	𽉱	𽉲	𽉳	𽉴	𽉵	𽉶	𽉷	𽉸	𽉹	𽉺	𽉻	𽉼	𽉽	𽉾	𽉿
U+3D28x	𽊀	𽊁	𽊂	𽊃	𽊄	𽊅	𽊆	𽊇	𽊈	𽊉	𽊊	𽊋	𽊌	𽊍	𽊎	𽊏
U+3D29x	𽊐	𽊑	𽊒	𽊓	𽊔	𽊕	𽊖	𽊗	𽊘	𽊙	𽊚	𽊛	𽊜	𽊝	𽊞	𽊟
U+3D2Ax	𽊠	𽊡	𽊢	𽊣	𽊤	𽊥	𽊦	𽊧	𽊨	𽊩	𽊪	𽊫	𽊬	𽊭	𽊮	𽊯
U+3D2Bx	𽊰	𽊱	𽊲	𽊳	𽊴	𽊵	𽊶	𽊷	𽊸	𽊹	𽊺	𽊻	𽊼	𽊽	𽊾	𽊿
U+3D2Cx	𽋀	𽋁	𽋂	𽋃	𽋄	𽋅	𽋆	𽋇	𽋈	𽋉	𽋊	𽋋	𽋌	𽋍	𽋎	𽋏
U+3D2Dx	𽋐	𽋑	𽋒	𽋓	𽋔	𽋕	𽋖	𽋗	𽋘	𽋙	𽋚	𽋛	𽋜	𽋝	𽋞	𽋟
U+3D2Ex	𽋠	𽋡	𽋢	𽋣	𽋤	𽋥	𽋦	𽋧	𽋨	𽋩	𽋪	𽋫	𽋬	𽋭	𽋮	𽋯
U+3D2Fx	𽋰	𽋱	𽋲	𽋳	𽋴	𽋵	𽋶	𽋷	𽋸	𽋹	𽋺	𽋻	𽋼	𽋽	𽋾	𽋿
U+3D30x	𽌀	𽌁	𽌂	𽌃	𽌄	𽌅	𽌆	𽌇	𽌈	𽌉	𽌊	𽌋	𽌌	𽌍	𽌎	𽌏
U+3D31x	𽌐	𽌑	𽌒	𽌓	𽌔	𽌕	𽌖	𽌗	𽌘	𽌙	𽌚	𽌛	𽌜	𽌝	𽌞	𽌟
U+3D32x	𽌠	𽌡	𽌢	𽌣	𽌤	𽌥	𽌦	𽌧	𽌨	𽌩	𽌪	𽌫	𽌬	𽌭	𽌮	𽌯
U+3D33x	𽌰	𽌱	𽌲	𽌳	𽌴	𽌵	𽌶	𽌷	𽌸	𽌹	𽌺	𽌻	𽌼	𽌽	𽌾	𽌿
U+3D34x	𽍀	𽍁	𽍂	𽍃	𽍄	𽍅	𽍆	𽍇	𽍈	𽍉	𽍊	𽍋	𽍌	𽍍	𽍎	𽍏
U+3D35x	𽍐	𽍑	𽍒	𽍓	𽍔	𽍕	𽍖	𽍗	𽍘	𽍙	𽍚	𽍛	𽍜	𽍝	𽍞	𽍟
U+3D36x	𽍠	𽍡	𽍢	𽍣	𽍤	𽍥	𽍦	𽍧	𽍨	𽍩	𽍪	𽍫	𽍬	𽍭	𽍮	𽍯
U+3D37x	𽍰	𽍱	𽍲	𽍳	𽍴	𽍵	𽍶	𽍷	𽍸	𽍹	𽍺	𽍻	𽍼	𽍽	𽍾	𽍿
U+3D38x	𽎀	𽎁	𽎂	𽎃	𽎄	𽎅	𽎆	𽎇	𽎈	𽎉	𽎊	𽎋	𽎌	𽎍	𽎎	𽎏
U+3D39x	𽎐	𽎑	𽎒	𽎓	𽎔	𽎕	𽎖	𽎗	𽎘	𽎙	𽎚	𽎛	𽎜	𽎝	𽎞	𽎟
U+3D3Ax	𽎠	𽎡	𽎢	𽎣	𽎤	𽎥	𽎦	𽎧	𽎨	𽎩	𽎪	𽎫	𽎬	𽎭	𽎮	𽎯
U+3D3Bx	𽎰	𽎱	𽎲	𽎳	𽎴	𽎵	𽎶	𽎷	𽎸	𽎹	𽎺	𽎻	𽎼	𽎽	𽎾	𽎿
U+3D3Cx	𽏀	𽏁	𽏂	𽏃	𽏄	𽏅	𽏆	𽏇	𽏈	𽏉	𽏊	𽏋	𽏌	𽏍	𽏎	𽏏
U+3D3Dx	𽏐	𽏑	𽏒	𽏓	𽏔	𽏕	𽏖	𽏗	𽏘	𽏙	𽏚	𽏛	𽏜	𽏝	𽏞	𽏟
U+3D3Ex	𽏠	𽏡	𽏢	𽏣	𽏤	𽏥	𽏦	𽏧	𽏨	𽏩	𽏪	𽏫	𽏬	𽏭	𽏮	𽏯
U+3D3Fx	𽏰	𽏱	𽏲	𽏳	𽏴	𽏵	𽏶	𽏷	𽏸	𽏹	𽏺	𽏻	𽏼	𽏽	𽏾	𽏿
U+3D40x	𽐀	𽐁	𽐂	𽐃	𽐄	𽐅	𽐆	𽐇	𽐈	𽐉	𽐊	𽐋	𽐌	𽐍	𽐎	𽐏
U+3D41x	𽐐	𽐑	𽐒	𽐓	𽐔	𽐕	𽐖	𽐗	𽐘	𽐙	𽐚	𽐛	𽐜	𽐝	𽐞	𽐟
U+3D42x	𽐠	𽐡	𽐢	𽐣	𽐤	𽐥	𽐦	𽐧	𽐨	𽐩	𽐪	𽐫	𽐬	𽐭	𽐮	𽐯
U+3D43x	𽐰	𽐱	𽐲	𽐳	𽐴	𽐵	𽐶	𽐷	𽐸	𽐹	𽐺	𽐻	𽐼	𽐽	𽐾	𽐿
U+3D44x	𽑀	𽑁	𽑂	𽑃	𽑄	𽑅	𽑆	𽑇	𽑈	𽑉	𽑊	𽑋	𽑌	𽑍	𽑎	𽑏
U+3D45x	𽑐	𽑑	𽑒	𽑓	𽑔	𽑕	𽑖	𽑗	𽑘	𽑙	𽑚	𽑛	𽑜	𽑝	𽑞	𽑟
U+3D46x	𽑠	𽑡	𽑢	𽑣	𽑤	𽑥	𽑦	𽑧	𽑨	𽑩	𽑪	𽑫	𽑬	𽑭	𽑮	𽑯
U+3D47x	𽑰	𽑱	𽑲	𽑳	𽑴	𽑵	𽑶	𽑷	𽑸	𽑹	𽑺	𽑻	𽑼	𽑽	𽑾	𽑿
U+3D48x	𽒀	𽒁	𽒂	𽒃	𽒄	𽒅	𽒆	𽒇	𽒈	𽒉	𽒊	𽒋	𽒌	𽒍	𽒎	𽒏
U+3D49x	𽒐	𽒑	𽒒	𽒓	𽒔	𽒕	𽒖	𽒗	𽒘	𽒙	𽒚	𽒛	𽒜	𽒝	𽒞	𽒟
U+3D4Ax	𽒠	𽒡	𽒢	𽒣	𽒤	𽒥	𽒦	𽒧	𽒨	𽒩	𽒪	𽒫	𽒬	𽒭	𽒮	𽒯
U+3D4Bx	𽒰	𽒱	𽒲	𽒳	𽒴	𽒵	𽒶	𽒷	𽒸	𽒹	𽒺	𽒻	𽒼	𽒽	𽒾	𽒿
U+3D4Cx	𽓀	𽓁	𽓂	𽓃	𽓄	𽓅	𽓆	𽓇	𽓈	𽓉	𽓊	𽓋	𽓌	𽓍	𽓎	𽓏
U+3D4Dx	𽓐	𽓑	𽓒	𽓓	𽓔	𽓕	𽓖	𽓗	𽓘	𽓙	𽓚	𽓛	𽓜	𽓝	𽓞	𽓟
U+3D4Ex	𽓠	𽓡	𽓢	𽓣	𽓤	𽓥	𽓦	𽓧	𽓨	𽓩	𽓪	𽓫	𽓬	𽓭	𽓮	𽓯
U+3D4Fx	𽓰	𽓱	𽓲	𽓳	𽓴	𽓵	𽓶	𽓷	𽓸	𽓹	𽓺	𽓻	𽓼	𽓽	𽓾	𽓿
U+3D50x	𽔀	𽔁	𽔂	𽔃	𽔄	𽔅	𽔆	𽔇	𽔈	𽔉	𽔊	𽔋	𽔌	𽔍	𽔎	𽔏
U+3D51x	𽔐	𽔑	𽔒	𽔓	𽔔	𽔕	𽔖	𽔗	𽔘	𽔙	𽔚	𽔛	𽔜	𽔝	𽔞	𽔟
U+3D52x	𽔠	𽔡	𽔢	𽔣	𽔤	𽔥	𽔦	𽔧	𽔨	𽔩	𽔪	𽔫	𽔬	𽔭	𽔮	𽔯
U+3D53x	𽔰	𽔱	𽔲	𽔳	𽔴	𽔵	𽔶	𽔷	𽔸	𽔹	𽔺	𽔻	𽔼	𽔽	𽔾	𽔿
U+3D54x	𽕀	𽕁	𽕂	𽕃	𽕄	𽕅	𽕆	𽕇	𽕈	𽕉	𽕊	𽕋	𽕌	𽕍	𽕎	𽕏
U+3D55x	𽕐	𽕑	𽕒	𽕓	𽕔	𽕕	𽕖	𽕗	𽕘	𽕙	𽕚	𽕛	𽕜	𽕝	𽕞	𽕟
U+3D56x	𽕠	𽕡	𽕢	𽕣	𽕤	𽕥	𽕦	𽕧	𽕨	𽕩	𽕪	𽕫	𽕬	𽕭	𽕮	𽕯
U+3D57x	𽕰	𽕱	𽕲	𽕳	𽕴	𽕵	𽕶	𽕷	𽕸	𽕹	𽕺	𽕻	𽕼	𽕽	𽕾	𽕿
U+3D58x	𽖀	𽖁	𽖂	𽖃	𽖄	𽖅	𽖆	𽖇	𽖈	𽖉	𽖊	𽖋	𽖌	𽖍	𽖎	𽖏
U+3D59x	𽖐	𽖑	𽖒	𽖓	𽖔	𽖕	𽖖	𽖗	𽖘	𽖙	𽖚	𽖛	𽖜	𽖝	𽖞	𽖟
U+3D5Ax	𽖠	𽖡	𽖢	𽖣	𽖤	𽖥	𽖦	𽖧	𽖨	𽖩	𽖪	𽖫	𽖬	𽖭	𽖮	𽖯
U+3D5Bx	𽖰	𽖱	𽖲	𽖳	𽖴	𽖵	𽖶	𽖷	𽖸	𽖹	𽖺	𽖻	𽖼	𽖽	𽖾	𽖿
U+3D5Cx	𽗀	𽗁	𽗂	𽗃	𽗄	𽗅	𽗆	𽗇	𽗈	𽗉	𽗊	𽗋	𽗌	𽗍	𽗎	𽗏
U+3D5Dx	𽗐	𽗑	𽗒	𽗓	𽗔	𽗕	𽗖	𽗗	𽗘	𽗙	𽗚	𽗛	𽗜	𽗝	𽗞	𽗟
U+3D5Ex	𽗠	𽗡	𽗢	𽗣	𽗤	𽗥	𽗦	𽗧	𽗨	𽗩	𽗪	𽗫	𽗬	𽗭	𽗮	𽗯
U+3D5Fx	𽗰	𽗱	𽗲	𽗳	𽗴	𽗵	𽗶	𽗷	𽗸	𽗹	𽗺	𽗻	𽗼	𽗽	𽗾	𽗿
U+3D60x	𽘀	𽘁	𽘂	𽘃	𽘄	𽘅	𽘆	𽘇	𽘈	𽘉	𽘊	𽘋	𽘌	𽘍	𽘎	𽘏
U+3D61x	𽘐	𽘑	𽘒	𽘓	𽘔	𽘕	𽘖	𽘗	𽘘	𽘙	𽘚	𽘛	𽘜	𽘝	𽘞	𽘟
U+3D62x	𽘠	𽘡	𽘢	𽘣	𽘤	𽘥	𽘦	𽘧	𽘨	𽘩	𽘪	𽘫	𽘬	𽘭	𽘮	𽘯
U+3D63x	𽘰	𽘱	𽘲	𽘳	𽘴	𽘵	𽘶	𽘷	𽘸	𽘹	𽘺	𽘻	𽘼	𽘽	𽘾	𽘿
U+3D64x	𽙀	𽙁	𽙂	𽙃	𽙄	𽙅	𽙆	𽙇	𽙈	𽙉	𽙊	𽙋	𽙌	𽙍	𽙎	𽙏
U+3D65x	𽙐	𽙑	𽙒	𽙓	𽙔	𽙕	𽙖	𽙗	𽙘	𽙙	𽙚	𽙛	𽙜	𽙝	𽙞	𽙟
U+3D66x	𽙠	𽙡	𽙢	𽙣	𽙤	𽙥	𽙦	𽙧	𽙨	𽙩	𽙪	𽙫	𽙬	𽙭	𽙮	𽙯
U+3D67x	𽙰	𽙱	𽙲	𽙳	𽙴	𽙵	𽙶	𽙷	𽙸	𽙹	𽙺	𽙻	𽙼	𽙽	𽙾	𽙿
U+3D68x	𽚀	𽚁	𽚂	𽚃	𽚄	𽚅	𽚆	𽚇	𽚈	𽚉	𽚊	𽚋	𽚌	𽚍	𽚎	𽚏
U+3D69x	𽚐	𽚑	𽚒	𽚓	𽚔	𽚕	𽚖	𽚗	𽚘	𽚙	𽚚	𽚛	𽚜	𽚝	𽚞	𽚟
U+3D6Ax	𽚠	𽚡	𽚢	𽚣	𽚤	𽚥	𽚦	𽚧	𽚨	𽚩	𽚪	𽚫	𽚬	𽚭	𽚮	𽚯
U+3D6Bx	𽚰	𽚱	𽚲	𽚳	𽚴	𽚵	𽚶	𽚷	𽚸	𽚹	𽚺	𽚻	𽚼	𽚽	𽚾	𽚿
U+3D6Cx	𽛀	𽛁	𽛂	𽛃	𽛄	𽛅	𽛆	𽛇	𽛈	𽛉	𽛊	𽛋	𽛌	𽛍	𽛎	𽛏
U+3D6Dx	𽛐	𽛑	𽛒	𽛓	𽛔	𽛕	𽛖	𽛗	𽛘	𽛙	𽛚	𽛛	𽛜	𽛝	𽛞	𽛟
U+3D6Ex	𽛠	𽛡	𽛢	𽛣	𽛤	𽛥	𽛦	𽛧	𽛨	𽛩	𽛪	𽛫	𽛬	𽛭	𽛮	𽛯
U+3D6Fx	𽛰	𽛱	𽛲	𽛳	𽛴	𽛵	𽛶	𽛷	𽛸	𽛹	𽛺	𽛻	𽛼	𽛽	𽛾	𽛿
U+3D70x	𽜀	𽜁	𽜂	𽜃	𽜄	𽜅	𽜆	𽜇	𽜈	𽜉	𽜊	𽜋	𽜌	𽜍	𽜎	𽜏
U+3D71x	𽜐	𽜑	𽜒	𽜓	𽜔	𽜕	𽜖	𽜗	𽜘	𽜙	𽜚	𽜛	𽜜	𽜝	𽜞	𽜟
U+3D72x	𽜠	𽜡	𽜢	𽜣	𽜤	𽜥	𽜦	𽜧	𽜨	𽜩	𽜪	𽜫	𽜬	𽜭	𽜮	𽜯
U+3D73x	𽜰	𽜱	𽜲	𽜳	𽜴	𽜵	𽜶	𽜷	𽜸	𽜹	𽜺	𽜻	𽜼	𽜽	𽜾	𽜿
U+3D74x	𽝀	𽝁	𽝂	𽝃	𽝄	𽝅	𽝆	𽝇	𽝈	𽝉	𽝊	𽝋	𽝌	𽝍	𽝎	𽝏
U+3D75x	𽝐	𽝑	𽝒	𽝓	𽝔	𽝕	𽝖	𽝗	𽝘	𽝙	𽝚	𽝛	𽝜	𽝝	𽝞	𽝟
U+3D76x	𽝠	𽝡	𽝢	𽝣	𽝤	𽝥	𽝦	𽝧	𽝨	𽝩	𽝪	𽝫	𽝬	𽝭	𽝮	𽝯
U+3D77x	𽝰	𽝱	𽝲	𽝳	𽝴	𽝵	𽝶	𽝷	𽝸	𽝹	𽝺	𽝻	𽝼	𽝽	𽝾	𽝿
U+3D78x	𽞀	𽞁	𽞂	𽞃	𽞄	𽞅	𽞆	𽞇	𽞈	𽞉	𽞊	𽞋	𽞌	𽞍	𽞎	𽞏
U+3D79x	𽞐	𽞑	𽞒	𽞓	𽞔	𽞕	𽞖	𽞗	𽞘	𽞙	𽞚	𽞛	𽞜	𽞝	𽞞	𽞟
U+3D7Ax	𽞠	𽞡	𽞢	𽞣	𽞤	𽞥	𽞦	𽞧	𽞨	𽞩	𽞪	𽞫	𽞬	𽞭	𽞮	𽞯
U+3D7Bx	𽞰	𽞱	𽞲	𽞳	𽞴	𽞵	𽞶	𽞷	𽞸	𽞹	𽞺	𽞻	𽞼	𽞽	𽞾	𽞿
U+3D7Cx	𽟀	𽟁	𽟂	𽟃	𽟄	𽟅	𽟆	𽟇	𽟈	𽟉	𽟊	𽟋	𽟌	𽟍	𽟎	𽟏
U+3D7Dx	𽟐	𽟑	𽟒	𽟓	𽟔	𽟕	𽟖	𽟗	𽟘	𽟙	𽟚	𽟛	𽟜	𽟝	𽟞	𽟟
U+3D7Ex	𽟠	𽟡	𽟢	𽟣	𽟤	𽟥	𽟦	𽟧	𽟨	𽟩	𽟪	𽟫	𽟬	𽟭	𽟮	𽟯
U+3D7Fx	𽟰	𽟱	𽟲	𽟳	𽟴	𽟵	𽟶	𽟷	𽟸	𽟹	𽟺	𽟻	𽟼	𽟽	𽟾	𽟿
U+3D80x	𽠀	𽠁	𽠂	𽠃	𽠄	𽠅	𽠆	𽠇	𽠈	𽠉	𽠊	𽠋	𽠌	𽠍	𽠎	𽠏
U+3D81x	𽠐	𽠑	𽠒	𽠓	𽠔	𽠕	𽠖	𽠗	𽠘	𽠙	𽠚	𽠛	𽠜	𽠝	𽠞	𽠟
U+3D82x	𽠠	𽠡	𽠢	𽠣	𽠤	𽠥	𽠦	𽠧	𽠨	𽠩	𽠪	𽠫	𽠬	𽠭	𽠮	𽠯
U+3D83x	𽠰	𽠱	𽠲	𽠳	𽠴	𽠵	𽠶	𽠷	𽠸	𽠹	𽠺	𽠻	𽠼	𽠽	𽠾	𽠿
U+3D84x	𽡀	𽡁	𽡂	𽡃	𽡄	𽡅	𽡆	𽡇	𽡈	𽡉	𽡊	𽡋	𽡌	𽡍	𽡎	𽡏
U+3D85x	𽡐	𽡑	𽡒	𽡓	𽡔	𽡕	𽡖	𽡗	𽡘	𽡙	𽡚	𽡛	𽡜	𽡝	𽡞	𽡟
U+3D86x	𽡠	𽡡	𽡢	𽡣	𽡤	𽡥	𽡦	𽡧	𽡨	𽡩	𽡪	𽡫	𽡬	𽡭	𽡮	𽡯
U+3D87x	𽡰	𽡱	𽡲	𽡳	𽡴	𽡵	𽡶	𽡷	𽡸	𽡹	𽡺	𽡻	𽡼	𽡽	𽡾	𽡿
U+3D88x	𽢀	𽢁	𽢂	𽢃	𽢄	𽢅	𽢆	𽢇	𽢈	𽢉	𽢊	𽢋	𽢌	𽢍	𽢎	𽢏
U+3D89x	𽢐	𽢑	𽢒	𽢓	𽢔	𽢕	𽢖	𽢗	𽢘	𽢙	𽢚	𽢛	𽢜	𽢝	𽢞	𽢟
U+3D8Ax	𽢠	𽢡	𽢢	𽢣	𽢤	𽢥	𽢦	𽢧	𽢨	𽢩	𽢪	𽢫	𽢬	𽢭	𽢮	𽢯
U+3D8Bx	𽢰	𽢱	𽢲	𽢳	𽢴	𽢵	𽢶	𽢷	𽢸	𽢹	𽢺	𽢻	𽢼	𽢽	𽢾	𽢿
U+3D8Cx	𽣀	𽣁	𽣂	𽣃	𽣄	𽣅	𽣆	𽣇	𽣈	𽣉	𽣊	𽣋	𽣌	𽣍	𽣎	𽣏
U+3D8Dx	𽣐	𽣑	𽣒	𽣓	𽣔	𽣕	𽣖	𽣗	𽣘	𽣙	𽣚	𽣛	𽣜	𽣝	𽣞	𽣟
U+3D8Ex	𽣠	𽣡	𽣢	𽣣	𽣤	𽣥	𽣦	𽣧	𽣨	𽣩	𽣪	𽣫	𽣬	𽣭	𽣮	𽣯
U+3D8Fx	𽣰	𽣱	𽣲	𽣳	𽣴	𽣵	𽣶	𽣷	𽣸	𽣹	𽣺	𽣻	𽣼	𽣽	𽣾	𽣿
U+3D90x	𽤀	𽤁	𽤂	𽤃	𽤄	𽤅	𽤆	𽤇	𽤈	𽤉	𽤊	𽤋	𽤌	𽤍	𽤎	𽤏
U+3D91x	𽤐	𽤑	𽤒	𽤓	𽤔	𽤕	𽤖	𽤗	𽤘	𽤙	𽤚	𽤛	𽤜	𽤝	𽤞	𽤟
U+3D92x	𽤠	𽤡	𽤢	𽤣	𽤤	𽤥	𽤦	𽤧	𽤨	𽤩	𽤪	𽤫	𽤬	𽤭	𽤮	𽤯
U+3D93x	𽤰	𽤱	𽤲	𽤳	𽤴	𽤵	𽤶	𽤷	𽤸	𽤹	𽤺	𽤻	𽤼	𽤽	𽤾	𽤿
U+3D94x	𽥀	𽥁	𽥂	𽥃	𽥄	𽥅	𽥆	𽥇	𽥈	𽥉	𽥊	𽥋	𽥌	𽥍	𽥎	𽥏
U+3D95x	𽥐	𽥑	𽥒	𽥓	𽥔	𽥕	𽥖	𽥗	𽥘	𽥙	𽥚	𽥛	𽥜	𽥝	𽥞	𽥟
U+3D96x	𽥠	𽥡	𽥢	𽥣	𽥤	𽥥	𽥦	𽥧	𽥨	𽥩	𽥪	𽥫	𽥬	𽥭	𽥮	𽥯
U+3D97x	𽥰	𽥱	𽥲	𽥳	𽥴	𽥵	𽥶	𽥷	𽥸	𽥹	𽥺	𽥻	𽥼	𽥽	𽥾	𽥿
U+3D98x	𽦀	𽦁	𽦂	𽦃	𽦄	𽦅	𽦆	𽦇	𽦈	𽦉	𽦊	𽦋	𽦌	𽦍	𽦎	𽦏
U+3D99x	𽦐	𽦑	𽦒	𽦓	𽦔	𽦕	𽦖	𽦗	𽦘	𽦙	𽦚	𽦛	𽦜	𽦝	𽦞	𽦟
U+3D9Ax	𽦠	𽦡	𽦢	𽦣	𽦤	𽦥	𽦦	𽦧	𽦨	𽦩	𽦪	𽦫	𽦬	𽦭	𽦮	𽦯
U+3D9Bx	𽦰	𽦱	𽦲	𽦳	𽦴	𽦵	𽦶	𽦷	𽦸	𽦹	𽦺	𽦻	𽦼	𽦽	𽦾	𽦿
U+3D9Cx	𽧀	𽧁	𽧂	𽧃	𽧄	𽧅	𽧆	𽧇	𽧈	𽧉	𽧊	𽧋	𽧌	𽧍	𽧎	𽧏
U+3D9Dx	𽧐	𽧑	𽧒	𽧓	𽧔	𽧕	𽧖	𽧗	𽧘	𽧙	𽧚	𽧛	𽧜	𽧝	𽧞	𽧟
U+3D9Ex	𽧠	𽧡	𽧢	𽧣	𽧤	𽧥	𽧦	𽧧	𽧨	𽧩	𽧪	𽧫	𽧬	𽧭	𽧮	𽧯
U+3D9Fx	𽧰	𽧱	𽧲	𽧳	𽧴	𽧵	𽧶	𽧷	𽧸	𽧹	𽧺	𽧻	𽧼	𽧽	𽧾	𽧿
U+3DA0x	𽨀	𽨁	𽨂	𽨃	𽨄	𽨅	𽨆	𽨇	𽨈	𽨉	𽨊	𽨋	𽨌	𽨍	𽨎	𽨏
U+3DA1x	𽨐	𽨑	𽨒	𽨓	𽨔	𽨕	𽨖	𽨗	𽨘	𽨙	𽨚	𽨛	𽨜	𽨝	𽨞	𽨟
U+3DA2x	𽨠	𽨡	𽨢	𽨣	𽨤	𽨥	𽨦	𽨧	𽨨	𽨩	𽨪	𽨫	𽨬	𽨭	𽨮	𽨯
U+3DA3x	𽨰	𽨱	𽨲	𽨳	𽨴	𽨵	𽨶	𽨷	𽨸	𽨹	𽨺	𽨻	𽨼	𽨽	𽨾	𽨿
U+3DA4x	𽩀	𽩁	𽩂	𽩃	𽩄	𽩅	𽩆	𽩇	𽩈	𽩉	𽩊	𽩋	𽩌	𽩍	𽩎	𽩏
U+3DA5x	𽩐	𽩑	𽩒	𽩓	𽩔	𽩕	𽩖	𽩗	𽩘	𽩙	𽩚	𽩛	𽩜	𽩝	𽩞	𽩟
U+3DA6x	𽩠	𽩡	𽩢	𽩣	𽩤	𽩥	𽩦	𽩧	𽩨	𽩩	𽩪	𽩫	𽩬	𽩭	𽩮	𽩯
U+3DA7x	𽩰	𽩱	𽩲	𽩳	𽩴	𽩵	𽩶	𽩷	𽩸	𽩹	𽩺	𽩻	𽩼	𽩽	𽩾	𽩿
U+3DA8x	𽪀	𽪁	𽪂	𽪃	𽪄	𽪅	𽪆	𽪇	𽪈	𽪉	𽪊	𽪋	𽪌	𽪍	𽪎	𽪏
U+3DA9x	𽪐	𽪑	𽪒	𽪓	𽪔	𽪕	𽪖	𽪗	𽪘	𽪙	𽪚	𽪛	𽪜	𽪝	𽪞	𽪟
U+3DAAx	𽪠	𽪡	𽪢	𽪣	𽪤	𽪥	𽪦	𽪧	𽪨	𽪩	𽪪	𽪫	𽪬	𽪭	𽪮	𽪯
U+3DABx	𽪰	𽪱	𽪲	𽪳	𽪴	𽪵	𽪶	𽪷	𽪸	𽪹	𽪺	𽪻	𽪼	𽪽	𽪾	𽪿
U+3DACx	𽫀	𽫁	𽫂	𽫃	𽫄	𽫅	𽫆	𽫇	𽫈	𽫉	𽫊	𽫋	𽫌	𽫍	𽫎	𽫏
U+3DADx	𽫐	𽫑	𽫒	𽫓	𽫔	𽫕	𽫖	𽫗	𽫘	𽫙	𽫚	𽫛	𽫜	𽫝	𽫞	𽫟
U+3DAEx	𽫠	𽫡	𽫢	𽫣	𽫤	𽫥	𽫦	𽫧	𽫨	𽫩	𽫪	𽫫	𽫬	𽫭	𽫮	𽫯
U+3DAFx	𽫰	𽫱	𽫲	𽫳	𽫴	𽫵	𽫶	𽫷	𽫸	𽫹	𽫺	𽫻	𽫼	𽫽	𽫾	𽫿
U+3DB0x	𽬀	𽬁	𽬂	𽬃	𽬄	𽬅	𽬆	𽬇	𽬈	𽬉	𽬊	𽬋	𽬌	𽬍	𽬎	𽬏
U+3DB1x	𽬐	𽬑	𽬒	𽬓	𽬔	𽬕	𽬖	𽬗	𽬘	𽬙	𽬚	𽬛	𽬜	𽬝	𽬞	𽬟
U+3DB2x	𽬠	𽬡	𽬢	𽬣	𽬤	𽬥	𽬦	𽬧	𽬨	𽬩	𽬪	𽬫	𽬬	𽬭	𽬮	𽬯
U+3DB3x	𽬰	𽬱	𽬲	𽬳	𽬴	𽬵	𽬶	𽬷	𽬸	𽬹	𽬺	𽬻	𽬼	𽬽	𽬾	𽬿
U+3DB4x	𽭀	𽭁	𽭂	𽭃	𽭄	𽭅	𽭆	𽭇	𽭈	𽭉	𽭊	𽭋	𽭌	𽭍	𽭎	𽭏
U+3DB5x	𽭐	𽭑	𽭒	𽭓	𽭔	𽭕	𽭖	𽭗	𽭘	𽭙	𽭚	𽭛	𽭜	𽭝	𽭞	𽭟
U+3DB6x	𽭠	𽭡	𽭢	𽭣	𽭤	𽭥	𽭦	𽭧	𽭨	𽭩	𽭪	𽭫	𽭬	𽭭	𽭮	𽭯
U+3DB7x	𽭰	𽭱	𽭲	𽭳	𽭴	𽭵	𽭶	𽭷	𽭸	𽭹	𽭺	𽭻	𽭼	𽭽	𽭾	𽭿
U+3DB8x	𽮀	𽮁	𽮂	𽮃	𽮄	𽮅	𽮆	𽮇	𽮈	𽮉	𽮊	𽮋	𽮌	𽮍	𽮎	𽮏
U+3DB9x	𽮐	𽮑	𽮒	𽮓	𽮔	𽮕	𽮖	𽮗	𽮘	𽮙	𽮚	𽮛	𽮜	𽮝	𽮞	𽮟
U+3DBAx	𽮠	𽮡	𽮢	𽮣	𽮤	𽮥	𽮦	𽮧	𽮨	𽮩	𽮪	𽮫	𽮬	𽮭	𽮮	𽮯
U+3DBBx	𽮰	𽮱	𽮲	𽮳	𽮴	𽮵	𽮶	𽮷	𽮸	𽮹	𽮺	𽮻	𽮼	𽮽	𽮾	𽮿
U+3DBCx	𽯀	𽯁	𽯂	𽯃	𽯄	𽯅	𽯆	𽯇	𽯈	𽯉	𽯊	𽯋	𽯌	𽯍	𽯎	𽯏
U+3DBDx	𽯐	𽯑	𽯒	𽯓	𽯔	𽯕	𽯖	𽯗	𽯘	𽯙	𽯚	𽯛	𽯜	𽯝	𽯞	𽯟
U+3DBEx	𽯠	𽯡	𽯢	𽯣	𽯤	𽯥	𽯦	𽯧	𽯨	𽯩	𽯪	𽯫	𽯬	𽯭	𽯮	𽯯
U+3DBFx	𽯰	𽯱	𽯲	𽯳	𽯴	𽯵	𽯶	𽯷	𽯸	𽯹	𽯺	𽯻	𽯼	𽯽	𽯾	𽯿
U+3DC0x	𽰀	𽰁	𽰂	𽰃	𽰄	𽰅	𽰆	𽰇	𽰈	𽰉	𽰊	𽰋	𽰌	𽰍	𽰎	𽰏
U+3DC1x	𽰐	𽰑	𽰒	𽰓	𽰔	𽰕	𽰖	𽰗	𽰘	𽰙	𽰚	𽰛	𽰜	𽰝	𽰞	𽰟
U+3DC2x	𽰠	𽰡	𽰢	𽰣	𽰤	𽰥	𽰦	𽰧	𽰨	𽰩	𽰪	𽰫	𽰬	𽰭	𽰮	𽰯
U+3DC3x	𽰰	𽰱	𽰲	𽰳	𽰴	𽰵	𽰶	𽰷	𽰸	𽰹	𽰺	𽰻	𽰼	𽰽	𽰾	𽰿
U+3DC4x	𽱀	𽱁	𽱂	𽱃	𽱄	𽱅	𽱆	𽱇	𽱈	𽱉	𽱊	𽱋	𽱌	𽱍	𽱎	𽱏
U+3DC5x	𽱐	𽱑	𽱒	𽱓	𽱔	𽱕	𽱖	𽱗	𽱘	𽱙	𽱚	𽱛	𽱜	𽱝	𽱞	𽱟
U+3DC6x	𽱠	𽱡	𽱢	𽱣	𽱤	𽱥	𽱦	𽱧	𽱨	𽱩	𽱪	𽱫	𽱬	𽱭	𽱮	𽱯
U+3DC7x	𽱰	𽱱	𽱲	𽱳	𽱴	𽱵	𽱶	𽱷	𽱸	𽱹	𽱺	𽱻	𽱼	𽱽	𽱾	𽱿
U+3DC8x	𽲀	𽲁	𽲂	𽲃	𽲄	𽲅	𽲆	𽲇	𽲈	𽲉	𽲊	𽲋	𽲌	𽲍	𽲎	𽲏
U+3DC9x	𽲐	𽲑	𽲒	𽲓	𽲔	𽲕	𽲖	𽲗	𽲘	𽲙	𽲚	𽲛	𽲜	𽲝	𽲞	𽲟
U+3DCAx	𽲠	𽲡	𽲢	𽲣	𽲤	𽲥	𽲦	𽲧	𽲨	𽲩	𽲪	𽲫	𽲬	𽲭	𽲮	𽲯
U+3DCBx	𽲰	𽲱	𽲲	𽲳	𽲴	𽲵	𽲶	𽲷	𽲸	𽲹	𽲺	𽲻	𽲼	𽲽	𽲾	𽲿
U+3DCCx	𽳀	𽳁	𽳂	𽳃	𽳄	𽳅	𽳆	𽳇	𽳈	𽳉	𽳊	𽳋	𽳌	𽳍	𽳎	𽳏
U+3DCDx	𽳐	𽳑	𽳒	𽳓	𽳔	𽳕	𽳖	𽳗	𽳘	𽳙	𽳚	𽳛	𽳜	𽳝	𽳞	𽳟
U+3DCEx	𽳠	𽳡	𽳢	𽳣	𽳤	𽳥	𽳦	𽳧	𽳨	𽳩	𽳪	𽳫	𽳬	𽳭	𽳮	𽳯
U+3DCFx	𽳰	𽳱	𽳲	𽳳	𽳴	𽳵	𽳶	𽳷	𽳸	𽳹	𽳺	𽳻	𽳼	𽳽	𽳾	𽳿
U+3DD0x	𽴀	𽴁	𽴂	𽴃	𽴄	𽴅	𽴆	𽴇	𽴈	𽴉	𽴊	𽴋	𽴌	𽴍	𽴎	𽴏
U+3DD1x	𽴐	𽴑	𽴒	𽴓	𽴔	𽴕	𽴖	𽴗	𽴘	𽴙	𽴚	𽴛	𽴜	𽴝	𽴞	𽴟
U+3DD2x	𽴠	𽴡	𽴢	𽴣	𽴤	𽴥	𽴦	𽴧	𽴨	𽴩	𽴪	𽴫	𽴬	𽴭	𽴮	𽴯
U+3DD3x	𽴰	𽴱	𽴲	𽴳	𽴴	𽴵	𽴶	𽴷	𽴸	𽴹	𽴺	𽴻	𽴼	𽴽	𽴾	𽴿
U+3DD4x	𽵀	𽵁	𽵂	𽵃	𽵄	𽵅	𽵆	𽵇	𽵈	𽵉	𽵊	𽵋	𽵌	𽵍	𽵎	𽵏
U+3DD5x	𽵐	𽵑	𽵒	𽵓	𽵔	𽵕	𽵖	𽵗	𽵘	𽵙	𽵚	𽵛	𽵜	𽵝	𽵞	𽵟
U+3DD6x	𽵠	𽵡	𽵢	𽵣	𽵤	𽵥	𽵦	𽵧	𽵨	𽵩	𽵪	𽵫	𽵬	𽵭	𽵮	𽵯
U+3DD7x	𽵰	𽵱	𽵲	𽵳	𽵴	𽵵	𽵶	𽵷	𽵸	𽵹	𽵺	𽵻	𽵼	𽵽	𽵾	𽵿
U+3DD8x	𽶀	𽶁	𽶂	𽶃	𽶄	𽶅	𽶆	𽶇	𽶈	𽶉	𽶊	𽶋	𽶌	𽶍	𽶎	𽶏
U+3DD9x	𽶐	𽶑	𽶒	𽶓	𽶔	𽶕	𽶖	𽶗	𽶘	𽶙	𽶚	𽶛	𽶜	𽶝	𽶞	𽶟
U+3DDAx	𽶠	𽶡	𽶢	𽶣	𽶤	𽶥	𽶦	𽶧	𽶨	𽶩	𽶪	𽶫	𽶬	𽶭	𽶮	𽶯
U+3DDBx	𽶰	𽶱	𽶲	𽶳	𽶴	𽶵	𽶶	𽶷	𽶸	𽶹	𽶺	𽶻	𽶼	𽶽	𽶾	𽶿
U+3DDCx	𽷀	𽷁	𽷂	𽷃	𽷄	𽷅	𽷆	𽷇	𽷈	𽷉	𽷊	𽷋	𽷌	𽷍	𽷎	𽷏
U+3DDDx	𽷐	𽷑	𽷒	𽷓	𽷔	𽷕	𽷖	𽷗	𽷘	𽷙	𽷚	𽷛	𽷜	𽷝	𽷞	𽷟
U+3DDEx	𽷠	𽷡	𽷢	𽷣	𽷤	𽷥	𽷦	𽷧	𽷨	𽷩	𽷪	𽷫	𽷬	𽷭	𽷮	𽷯
U+3DDFx	𽷰	𽷱	𽷲	𽷳	𽷴	𽷵	𽷶	𽷷	𽷸	𽷹	𽷺	𽷻	𽷼	𽷽	𽷾	𽷿
U+3DE0x	𽸀	𽸁	𽸂	𽸃	𽸄	𽸅	𽸆	𽸇	𽸈	𽸉	𽸊	𽸋	𽸌	𽸍	𽸎	𽸏
U+3DE1x	𽸐	𽸑	𽸒	𽸓	𽸔	𽸕	𽸖	𽸗	𽸘	𽸙	𽸚	𽸛	𽸜	𽸝	𽸞	𽸟
U+3DE2x	𽸠	𽸡	𽸢	𽸣	𽸤	𽸥	𽸦	𽸧	𽸨	𽸩	𽸪	𽸫	𽸬	𽸭	𽸮	𽸯
U+3DE3x	𽸰	𽸱	𽸲	𽸳	𽸴	𽸵	𽸶	𽸷	𽸸	𽸹	𽸺	𽸻	𽸼	𽸽	𽸾	𽸿
U+3DE4x	𽹀	𽹁	𽹂	𽹃	𽹄	𽹅	𽹆	𽹇	𽹈	𽹉	𽹊	𽹋	𽹌	𽹍	𽹎	𽹏
U+3DE5x	𽹐	𽹑	𽹒	𽹓	𽹔	𽹕	𽹖	𽹗	𽹘	𽹙	𽹚	𽹛	𽹜	𽹝	𽹞	𽹟
U+3DE6x	𽹠	𽹡	𽹢	𽹣	𽹤	𽹥	𽹦	𽹧	𽹨	𽹩	𽹪	𽹫	𽹬	𽹭	𽹮	𽹯
U+3DE7x	𽹰	𽹱	𽹲	𽹳	𽹴	𽹵	𽹶	𽹷	𽹸	𽹹	𽹺	𽹻	𽹼	𽹽	𽹾	𽹿
U+3DE8x	𽺀	𽺁	𽺂	𽺃	𽺄	𽺅	𽺆	𽺇	𽺈	𽺉	𽺊	𽺋	𽺌	𽺍	𽺎	𽺏
U+3DE9x	𽺐	𽺑	𽺒	𽺓	𽺔	𽺕	𽺖	𽺗	𽺘	𽺙	𽺚	𽺛	𽺜	𽺝	𽺞	𽺟
U+3DEAx	𽺠	𽺡	𽺢	𽺣	𽺤	𽺥	𽺦	𽺧	𽺨	𽺩	𽺪	𽺫	𽺬	𽺭	𽺮	𽺯
U+3DEBx	𽺰	𽺱	𽺲	𽺳	𽺴	𽺵	𽺶	𽺷	𽺸	𽺹	𽺺	𽺻	𽺼	𽺽	𽺾	𽺿
U+3DECx	𽻀	𽻁	𽻂	𽻃	𽻄	𽻅	𽻆	𽻇	𽻈	𽻉	𽻊	𽻋	𽻌	𽻍	𽻎	𽻏
U+3DEDx	𽻐	𽻑	𽻒	𽻓	𽻔	𽻕	𽻖	𽻗	𽻘	𽻙	𽻚	𽻛	𽻜	𽻝	𽻞	𽻟
U+3DEEx	𽻠	𽻡	𽻢	𽻣	𽻤	𽻥	𽻦	𽻧	𽻨	𽻩	𽻪	𽻫	𽻬	𽻭	𽻮	𽻯
U+3DEFx	𽻰	𽻱	𽻲	𽻳	𽻴	𽻵	𽻶	𽻷	𽻸	𽻹	𽻺	𽻻	𽻼	𽻽	𽻾	𽻿
U+3DF0x	𽼀	𽼁	𽼂	𽼃	𽼄	𽼅	𽼆	𽼇	𽼈	𽼉	𽼊	𽼋	𽼌	𽼍	𽼎	𽼏
U+3DF1x	𽼐	𽼑	𽼒	𽼓	𽼔	𽼕	𽼖	𽼗	𽼘	𽼙	𽼚	𽼛	𽼜	𽼝	𽼞	𽼟
U+3DF2x	𽼠	𽼡	𽼢	𽼣	𽼤	𽼥	𽼦	𽼧	𽼨	𽼩	𽼪	𽼫	𽼬	𽼭	𽼮	𽼯
U+3DF3x	𽼰	𽼱	𽼲	𽼳	𽼴	𽼵	𽼶	𽼷	𽼸	𽼹	𽼺	𽼻	𽼼	𽼽	𽼾	𽼿
U+3DF4x	𽽀	𽽁	𽽂	𽽃	𽽄	𽽅	𽽆	𽽇	𽽈	𽽉	𽽊	𽽋	𽽌	𽽍	𽽎	𽽏
U+3DF5x	𽽐	𽽑	𽽒	𽽓	𽽔	𽽕	𽽖	𽽗	𽽘	𽽙	𽽚	𽽛	𽽜	𽽝	𽽞	𽽟
U+3DF6x	𽽠	𽽡	𽽢	𽽣	𽽤	𽽥	𽽦	𽽧	𽽨	𽽩	𽽪	𽽫	𽽬	𽽭	𽽮	𽽯
U+3DF7x	𽽰	𽽱	𽽲	𽽳	𽽴	𽽵	𽽶	𽽷	𽽸	𽽹	𽽺	𽽻	𽽼	𽽽	𽽾	𽽿
U+3DF8x	𽾀	𽾁	𽾂	𽾃	𽾄	𽾅	𽾆	𽾇	𽾈	𽾉	𽾊	𽾋	𽾌	𽾍	𽾎	𽾏
U+3DF9x	𽾐	𽾑	𽾒	𽾓	𽾔	𽾕	𽾖	𽾗	𽾘	𽾙	𽾚	𽾛	𽾜	𽾝	𽾞	𽾟
U+3DFAx	𽾠	𽾡	𽾢	𽾣	𽾤	𽾥	𽾦	𽾧	𽾨	𽾩	𽾪	𽾫	𽾬	𽾭	𽾮	𽾯
U+3DFBx	𽾰	𽾱	𽾲	𽾳	𽾴	𽾵	𽾶	𽾷	𽾸	𽾹	𽾺	𽾻	𽾼	𽾽	𽾾	𽾿
U+3DFCx	𽿀	𽿁	𽿂	𽿃	𽿄	𽿅	𽿆	𽿇	𽿈	𽿉	𽿊	𽿋	𽿌	𽿍	𽿎	𽿏
U+3DFDx	𽿐	𽿑	𽿒	𽿓	𽿔	𽿕	𽿖	𽿗	𽿘	𽿙	𽿚	𽿛	𽿜	𽿝	𽿞	𽿟
U+3DFEx	𽿠	𽿡	𽿢	𽿣	𽿤	𽿥	𽿦	𽿧	𽿨	𽿩	𽿪	𽿫	𽿬	𽿭	𽿮	𽿯
U+3DFFx	𽿰	𽿱	𽿲	𽿳	𽿴	𽿵	𽿶	𽿷	𽿸	𽿹	𽿺	𽿻	𽿼	𽿽	𽿾	𽿿
U+3E00x	𾀀	𾀁	𾀂	𾀃	𾀄	𾀅	𾀆	𾀇	𾀈	𾀉	𾀊	𾀋	𾀌	𾀍	𾀎	𾀏
U+3E01x	𾀐	𾀑	𾀒	𾀓	𾀔	𾀕	𾀖	𾀗	𾀘	𾀙	𾀚	𾀛	𾀜	𾀝	𾀞	𾀟
U+3E02x	𾀠	𾀡	𾀢	𾀣	𾀤	𾀥	𾀦	𾀧	𾀨	𾀩	𾀪	𾀫	𾀬	𾀭	𾀮	𾀯
U+3E03x	𾀰	𾀱	𾀲	𾀳	𾀴	𾀵	𾀶	𾀷	𾀸	𾀹	𾀺	𾀻	𾀼	𾀽	𾀾	𾀿
U+3E04x	𾁀	𾁁	𾁂	𾁃	𾁄	𾁅	𾁆	𾁇	𾁈	𾁉	𾁊	𾁋	𾁌	𾁍	𾁎	𾁏
U+3E05x	𾁐	𾁑	𾁒	𾁓	𾁔	𾁕	𾁖	𾁗	𾁘	𾁙	𾁚	𾁛	𾁜	𾁝	𾁞	𾁟
U+3E06x	𾁠	𾁡	𾁢	𾁣	𾁤	𾁥	𾁦	𾁧	𾁨	𾁩	𾁪	𾁫	𾁬	𾁭	𾁮	𾁯
U+3E07x	𾁰	𾁱	𾁲	𾁳	𾁴	𾁵	𾁶	𾁷	𾁸	𾁹	𾁺	𾁻	𾁼	𾁽	𾁾	𾁿
U+3E08x	𾂀	𾂁	𾂂	𾂃	𾂄	𾂅	𾂆	𾂇	𾂈	𾂉	𾂊	𾂋	𾂌	𾂍	𾂎	𾂏
U+3E09x	𾂐	𾂑	𾂒	𾂓	𾂔	𾂕	𾂖	𾂗	𾂘	𾂙	𾂚	𾂛	𾂜	𾂝	𾂞	𾂟
U+3E0Ax	𾂠	𾂡	𾂢	𾂣	𾂤	𾂥	𾂦	𾂧	𾂨	𾂩	𾂪	𾂫	𾂬	𾂭	𾂮	𾂯
U+3E0Bx	𾂰	𾂱	𾂲	𾂳	𾂴	𾂵	𾂶	𾂷	𾂸	𾂹	𾂺	𾂻	𾂼	𾂽	𾂾	𾂿
U+3E0Cx	𾃀	𾃁	𾃂	𾃃	𾃄	𾃅	𾃆	𾃇	𾃈	𾃉	𾃊	𾃋	𾃌	𾃍	𾃎	𾃏
U+3E0Dx	𾃐	𾃑	𾃒	𾃓	𾃔	𾃕	𾃖	𾃗	𾃘	𾃙	𾃚	𾃛	𾃜	𾃝	𾃞	𾃟
U+3E0Ex	𾃠	𾃡	𾃢	𾃣	𾃤	𾃥	𾃦	𾃧	𾃨	𾃩	𾃪	𾃫	𾃬	𾃭	𾃮	𾃯
U+3E0Fx	𾃰	𾃱	𾃲	𾃳	𾃴	𾃵	𾃶	𾃷	𾃸	𾃹	𾃺	𾃻	𾃼	𾃽	𾃾	𾃿
U+3E10x	𾄀	𾄁	𾄂	𾄃	𾄄	𾄅	𾄆	𾄇	𾄈	𾄉	𾄊	𾄋	𾄌	𾄍	𾄎	𾄏
U+3E11x	𾄐	𾄑	𾄒	𾄓	𾄔	𾄕	𾄖	𾄗	𾄘	𾄙	𾄚	𾄛	𾄜	𾄝	𾄞	𾄟
U+3E12x	𾄠	𾄡	𾄢	𾄣	𾄤	𾄥	𾄦	𾄧	𾄨	𾄩	𾄪	𾄫	𾄬	𾄭	𾄮	𾄯
U+3E13x	𾄰	𾄱	𾄲	𾄳	𾄴	𾄵	𾄶	𾄷	𾄸	𾄹	𾄺	𾄻	𾄼	𾄽	𾄾	𾄿
U+3E14x	𾅀	𾅁	𾅂	𾅃	𾅄	𾅅	𾅆	𾅇	𾅈	𾅉	𾅊	𾅋	𾅌	𾅍	𾅎	𾅏
U+3E15x	𾅐	𾅑	𾅒	𾅓	𾅔	𾅕	𾅖	𾅗	𾅘	𾅙	𾅚	𾅛	𾅜	𾅝	𾅞	𾅟
U+3E16x	𾅠	𾅡	𾅢	𾅣	𾅤	𾅥	𾅦	𾅧	𾅨	𾅩	𾅪	𾅫	𾅬	𾅭	𾅮	𾅯
U+3E17x	𾅰	𾅱	𾅲	𾅳	𾅴	𾅵	𾅶	𾅷	𾅸	𾅹	𾅺	𾅻	𾅼	𾅽	𾅾	𾅿
U+3E18x	𾆀	𾆁	𾆂	𾆃	𾆄	𾆅	𾆆	𾆇	𾆈	𾆉	𾆊	𾆋	𾆌	𾆍	𾆎	𾆏
U+3E19x	𾆐	𾆑	𾆒	𾆓	𾆔	𾆕	𾆖	𾆗	𾆘	𾆙	𾆚	𾆛	𾆜	𾆝	𾆞	𾆟
U+3E1Ax	𾆠	𾆡	𾆢	𾆣	𾆤	𾆥	𾆦	𾆧	𾆨	𾆩	𾆪	𾆫	𾆬	𾆭	𾆮	𾆯
U+3E1Bx	𾆰	𾆱	𾆲	𾆳	𾆴	𾆵	𾆶	𾆷	𾆸	𾆹	𾆺	𾆻	𾆼	𾆽	𾆾	𾆿
U+3E1Cx	𾇀	𾇁	𾇂	𾇃	𾇄	𾇅	𾇆	𾇇	𾇈	𾇉	𾇊	𾇋	𾇌	𾇍	𾇎	𾇏
U+3E1Dx	𾇐	𾇑	𾇒	𾇓	𾇔	𾇕	𾇖	𾇗	𾇘	𾇙	𾇚	𾇛	𾇜	𾇝	𾇞	𾇟
U+3E1Ex	𾇠	𾇡	𾇢	𾇣	𾇤	𾇥	𾇦	𾇧	𾇨	𾇩	𾇪	𾇫	𾇬	𾇭	𾇮	𾇯
U+3E1Fx	𾇰	𾇱	𾇲	𾇳	𾇴	𾇵	𾇶	𾇷	𾇸	𾇹	𾇺	𾇻	𾇼	𾇽	𾇾	𾇿
U+3E20x	𾈀	𾈁	𾈂	𾈃	𾈄	𾈅	𾈆	𾈇	𾈈	𾈉	𾈊	𾈋	𾈌	𾈍	𾈎	𾈏
U+3E21x	𾈐	𾈑	𾈒	𾈓	𾈔	𾈕	𾈖	𾈗	𾈘	𾈙	𾈚	𾈛	𾈜	𾈝	𾈞	𾈟
U+3E22x	𾈠	𾈡	𾈢	𾈣	𾈤	𾈥	𾈦	𾈧	𾈨	𾈩	𾈪	𾈫	𾈬	𾈭	𾈮	𾈯
U+3E23x	𾈰	𾈱	𾈲	𾈳	𾈴	𾈵	𾈶	𾈷	𾈸	𾈹	𾈺	𾈻	𾈼	𾈽	𾈾	𾈿
U+3E24x	𾉀	𾉁	𾉂	𾉃	𾉄	𾉅	𾉆	𾉇	𾉈	𾉉	𾉊	𾉋	𾉌	𾉍	𾉎	𾉏
U+3E25x	𾉐	𾉑	𾉒	𾉓	𾉔	𾉕	𾉖	𾉗	𾉘	𾉙	𾉚	𾉛	𾉜	𾉝	𾉞	𾉟
U+3E26x	𾉠	𾉡	𾉢	𾉣	𾉤	𾉥	𾉦	𾉧	𾉨	𾉩	𾉪	𾉫	𾉬	𾉭	𾉮	𾉯
U+3E27x	𾉰	𾉱	𾉲	𾉳	𾉴	𾉵	𾉶	𾉷	𾉸	𾉹	𾉺	𾉻	𾉼	𾉽	𾉾	𾉿
U+3E28x	𾊀	𾊁	𾊂	𾊃	𾊄	𾊅	𾊆	𾊇	𾊈	𾊉	𾊊	𾊋	𾊌	𾊍	𾊎	𾊏
U+3E29x	𾊐	𾊑	𾊒	𾊓	𾊔	𾊕	𾊖	𾊗	𾊘	𾊙	𾊚	𾊛	𾊜	𾊝	𾊞	𾊟
U+3E2Ax	𾊠	𾊡	𾊢	𾊣	𾊤	𾊥	𾊦	𾊧	𾊨	𾊩	𾊪	𾊫	𾊬	𾊭	𾊮	𾊯
U+3E2Bx	𾊰	𾊱	𾊲	𾊳	𾊴	𾊵	𾊶	𾊷	𾊸	𾊹	𾊺	𾊻	𾊼	𾊽	𾊾	𾊿
U+3E2Cx	𾋀	𾋁	𾋂	𾋃	𾋄	𾋅	𾋆	𾋇	𾋈	𾋉	𾋊	𾋋	𾋌	𾋍	𾋎	𾋏
U+3E2Dx	𾋐	𾋑	𾋒	𾋓	𾋔	𾋕	𾋖	𾋗	𾋘	𾋙	𾋚	𾋛	𾋜	𾋝	𾋞	𾋟
U+3E2Ex	𾋠	𾋡	𾋢	𾋣	𾋤	𾋥	𾋦	𾋧	𾋨	𾋩	𾋪	𾋫	𾋬	𾋭	𾋮	𾋯
U+3E2Fx	𾋰	𾋱	𾋲	𾋳	𾋴	𾋵	𾋶	𾋷	𾋸	𾋹	𾋺	𾋻	𾋼	𾋽	𾋾	𾋿
U+3E30x	𾌀	𾌁	𾌂	𾌃	𾌄	𾌅	𾌆	𾌇	𾌈	𾌉	𾌊	𾌋	𾌌	𾌍	𾌎	𾌏
U+3E31x	𾌐	𾌑	𾌒	𾌓	𾌔	𾌕	𾌖	𾌗	𾌘	𾌙	𾌚	𾌛	𾌜	𾌝	𾌞	𾌟
U+3E32x	𾌠	𾌡	𾌢	𾌣	𾌤	𾌥	𾌦	𾌧	𾌨	𾌩	𾌪	𾌫	𾌬	𾌭	𾌮	𾌯
U+3E33x	𾌰	𾌱	𾌲	𾌳	𾌴	𾌵	𾌶	𾌷	𾌸	𾌹	𾌺	𾌻	𾌼	𾌽	𾌾	𾌿
U+3E34x	𾍀	𾍁	𾍂	𾍃	𾍄	𾍅	𾍆	𾍇	𾍈	𾍉	𾍊	𾍋	𾍌	𾍍	𾍎	𾍏
U+3E35x	𾍐	𾍑	𾍒	𾍓	𾍔	𾍕	𾍖	𾍗	𾍘	𾍙	𾍚	𾍛	𾍜	𾍝	𾍞	𾍟
U+3E36x	𾍠	𾍡	𾍢	𾍣	𾍤	𾍥	𾍦	𾍧	𾍨	𾍩	𾍪	𾍫	𾍬	𾍭	𾍮	𾍯
U+3E37x	𾍰	𾍱	𾍲	𾍳	𾍴	𾍵	𾍶	𾍷	𾍸	𾍹	𾍺	𾍻	𾍼	𾍽	𾍾	𾍿
U+3E38x	𾎀	𾎁	𾎂	𾎃	𾎄	𾎅	𾎆	𾎇	𾎈	𾎉	𾎊	𾎋	𾎌	𾎍	𾎎	𾎏
U+3E39x	𾎐	𾎑	𾎒	𾎓	𾎔	𾎕	𾎖	𾎗	𾎘	𾎙	𾎚	𾎛	𾎜	𾎝	𾎞	𾎟
U+3E3Ax	𾎠	𾎡	𾎢	𾎣	𾎤	𾎥	𾎦	𾎧	𾎨	𾎩	𾎪	𾎫	𾎬	𾎭	𾎮	𾎯
U+3E3Bx	𾎰	𾎱	𾎲	𾎳	𾎴	𾎵	𾎶	𾎷	𾎸	𾎹	𾎺	𾎻	𾎼	𾎽	𾎾	𾎿
U+3E3Cx	𾏀	𾏁	𾏂	𾏃	𾏄	𾏅	𾏆	𾏇	𾏈	𾏉	𾏊	𾏋	𾏌	𾏍	𾏎	𾏏
U+3E3Dx	𾏐	𾏑	𾏒	𾏓	𾏔	𾏕	𾏖	𾏗	𾏘	𾏙	𾏚	𾏛	𾏜	𾏝	𾏞	𾏟
U+3E3Ex	𾏠	𾏡	𾏢	𾏣	𾏤	𾏥	𾏦	𾏧	𾏨	𾏩	𾏪	𾏫	𾏬	𾏭	𾏮	𾏯
U+3E3Fx	𾏰	𾏱	𾏲	𾏳	𾏴	𾏵	𾏶	𾏷	𾏸	𾏹	𾏺	𾏻	𾏼	𾏽	𾏾	𾏿
U+3E40x	𾐀	𾐁	𾐂	𾐃	𾐄	𾐅	𾐆	𾐇	𾐈	𾐉	𾐊	𾐋	𾐌	𾐍	𾐎	𾐏
U+3E41x	𾐐	𾐑	𾐒	𾐓	𾐔	𾐕	𾐖	𾐗	𾐘	𾐙	𾐚	𾐛	𾐜	𾐝	𾐞	𾐟
U+3E42x	𾐠	𾐡	𾐢	𾐣	𾐤	𾐥	𾐦	𾐧	𾐨	𾐩	𾐪	𾐫	𾐬	𾐭	𾐮	𾐯
U+3E43x	𾐰	𾐱	𾐲	𾐳	𾐴	𾐵	𾐶	𾐷	𾐸	𾐹	𾐺	𾐻	𾐼	𾐽	𾐾	𾐿
U+3E44x	𾑀	𾑁	𾑂	𾑃	𾑄	𾑅	𾑆	𾑇	𾑈	𾑉	𾑊	𾑋	𾑌	𾑍	𾑎	𾑏
U+3E45x	𾑐	𾑑	𾑒	𾑓	𾑔	𾑕	𾑖	𾑗	𾑘	𾑙	𾑚	𾑛	𾑜	𾑝	𾑞	𾑟
U+3E46x	𾑠	𾑡	𾑢	𾑣	𾑤	𾑥	𾑦	𾑧	𾑨	𾑩	𾑪	𾑫	𾑬	𾑭	𾑮	𾑯
U+3E47x	𾑰	𾑱	𾑲	𾑳	𾑴	𾑵	𾑶	𾑷	𾑸	𾑹	𾑺	𾑻	𾑼	𾑽	𾑾	𾑿
U+3E48x	𾒀	𾒁	𾒂	𾒃	𾒄	𾒅	𾒆	𾒇	𾒈	𾒉	𾒊	𾒋	𾒌	𾒍	𾒎	𾒏
U+3E49x	𾒐	𾒑	𾒒	𾒓	𾒔	𾒕	𾒖	𾒗	𾒘	𾒙	𾒚	𾒛	𾒜	𾒝	𾒞	𾒟
U+3E4Ax	𾒠	𾒡	𾒢	𾒣	𾒤	𾒥	𾒦	𾒧	𾒨	𾒩	𾒪	𾒫	𾒬	𾒭	𾒮	𾒯
U+3E4Bx	𾒰	𾒱	𾒲	𾒳	𾒴	𾒵	𾒶	𾒷	𾒸	𾒹	𾒺	𾒻	𾒼	𾒽	𾒾	𾒿
U+3E4Cx	𾓀	𾓁	𾓂	𾓃	𾓄	𾓅	𾓆	𾓇	𾓈	𾓉	𾓊	𾓋	𾓌	𾓍	𾓎	𾓏
U+3E4Dx	𾓐	𾓑	𾓒	𾓓	𾓔	𾓕	𾓖	𾓗	𾓘	𾓙	𾓚	𾓛	𾓜	𾓝	𾓞	𾓟
U+3E4Ex	𾓠	𾓡	𾓢	𾓣	𾓤	𾓥	𾓦	𾓧	𾓨	𾓩	𾓪	𾓫	𾓬	𾓭	𾓮	𾓯
U+3E4Fx	𾓰	𾓱	𾓲	𾓳	𾓴	𾓵	𾓶	𾓷	𾓸	𾓹	𾓺	𾓻	𾓼	𾓽	𾓾	𾓿
U+3E50x	𾔀	𾔁	𾔂	𾔃	𾔄	𾔅	𾔆	𾔇	𾔈	𾔉	𾔊	𾔋	𾔌	𾔍	𾔎	𾔏
U+3E51x	𾔐	𾔑	𾔒	𾔓	𾔔	𾔕	𾔖	𾔗	𾔘	𾔙	𾔚	𾔛	𾔜	𾔝	𾔞	𾔟
U+3E52x	𾔠	𾔡	𾔢	𾔣	𾔤	𾔥	𾔦	𾔧	𾔨	𾔩	𾔪	𾔫	𾔬	𾔭	𾔮	𾔯
U+3E53x	𾔰	𾔱	𾔲	𾔳	𾔴	𾔵	𾔶	𾔷	𾔸	𾔹	𾔺	𾔻	𾔼	𾔽	𾔾	𾔿
U+3E54x	𾕀	𾕁	𾕂	𾕃	𾕄	𾕅	𾕆	𾕇	𾕈	𾕉	𾕊	𾕋	𾕌	𾕍	𾕎	𾕏
U+3E55x	𾕐	𾕑	𾕒	𾕓	𾕔	𾕕	𾕖	𾕗	𾕘	𾕙	𾕚	𾕛	𾕜	𾕝	𾕞	𾕟
U+3E56x	𾕠	𾕡	𾕢	𾕣	𾕤	𾕥	𾕦	𾕧	𾕨	𾕩	𾕪	𾕫	𾕬	𾕭	𾕮	𾕯
U+3E57x	𾕰	𾕱	𾕲	𾕳	𾕴	𾕵	𾕶	𾕷	𾕸	𾕹	𾕺	𾕻	𾕼	𾕽	𾕾	𾕿
U+3E58x	𾖀	𾖁	𾖂	𾖃	𾖄	𾖅	𾖆	𾖇	𾖈	𾖉	𾖊	𾖋	𾖌	𾖍	𾖎	𾖏
U+3E59x	𾖐	𾖑	𾖒	𾖓	𾖔	𾖕	𾖖	𾖗	𾖘	𾖙	𾖚	𾖛	𾖜	𾖝	𾖞	𾖟
U+3E5Ax	𾖠	𾖡	𾖢	𾖣	𾖤	𾖥	𾖦	𾖧	𾖨	𾖩	𾖪	𾖫	𾖬	𾖭	𾖮	𾖯
U+3E5Bx	𾖰	𾖱	𾖲	𾖳	𾖴	𾖵	𾖶	𾖷	𾖸	𾖹	𾖺	𾖻	𾖼	𾖽	𾖾	𾖿
U+3E5Cx	𾗀	𾗁	𾗂	𾗃	𾗄	𾗅	𾗆	𾗇	𾗈	𾗉	𾗊	𾗋	𾗌	𾗍	𾗎	𾗏
U+3E5Dx	𾗐	𾗑	𾗒	𾗓	𾗔	𾗕	𾗖	𾗗	𾗘	𾗙	𾗚	𾗛	𾗜	𾗝	𾗞	𾗟
U+3E5Ex	𾗠	𾗡	𾗢	𾗣	𾗤	𾗥	𾗦	𾗧	𾗨	𾗩	𾗪	𾗫	𾗬	𾗭	𾗮	𾗯
U+3E5Fx	𾗰	𾗱	𾗲	𾗳	𾗴	𾗵	𾗶	𾗷	𾗸	𾗹	𾗺	𾗻	𾗼	𾗽	𾗾	𾗿
U+3E60x	𾘀	𾘁	𾘂	𾘃	𾘄	𾘅	𾘆	𾘇	𾘈	𾘉	𾘊	𾘋	𾘌	𾘍	𾘎	𾘏
U+3E61x	𾘐	𾘑	𾘒	𾘓	𾘔	𾘕	𾘖	𾘗	𾘘	𾘙	𾘚	𾘛	𾘜	𾘝	𾘞	𾘟
U+3E62x	𾘠	𾘡	𾘢	𾘣	𾘤	𾘥	𾘦	𾘧	𾘨	𾘩	𾘪	𾘫	𾘬	𾘭	𾘮	𾘯
U+3E63x	𾘰	𾘱	𾘲	𾘳	𾘴	𾘵	𾘶	𾘷	𾘸	𾘹	𾘺	𾘻	𾘼	𾘽	𾘾	𾘿
U+3E64x	𾙀	𾙁	𾙂	𾙃	𾙄	𾙅	𾙆	𾙇	𾙈	𾙉	𾙊	𾙋	𾙌	𾙍	𾙎	𾙏
U+3E65x	𾙐	𾙑	𾙒	𾙓	𾙔	𾙕	𾙖	𾙗	𾙘	𾙙	𾙚	𾙛	𾙜	𾙝	𾙞	𾙟
U+3E66x	𾙠	𾙡	𾙢	𾙣	𾙤	𾙥	𾙦	𾙧	𾙨	𾙩	𾙪	𾙫	𾙬	𾙭	𾙮	𾙯
U+3E67x	𾙰	𾙱	𾙲	𾙳	𾙴	𾙵	𾙶	𾙷	𾙸	𾙹	𾙺	𾙻	𾙼	𾙽	𾙾	𾙿
U+3E68x	𾚀	𾚁	𾚂	𾚃	𾚄	𾚅	𾚆	𾚇	𾚈	𾚉	𾚊	𾚋	𾚌	𾚍	𾚎	𾚏
U+3E69x	𾚐	𾚑	𾚒	𾚓	𾚔	𾚕	𾚖	𾚗	𾚘	𾚙	𾚚	𾚛	𾚜	𾚝	𾚞	𾚟
U+3E6Ax	𾚠	𾚡	𾚢	𾚣	𾚤	𾚥	𾚦	𾚧	𾚨	𾚩	𾚪	𾚫	𾚬	𾚭	𾚮	𾚯
U+3E6Bx	𾚰	𾚱	𾚲	𾚳	𾚴	𾚵	𾚶	𾚷	𾚸	𾚹	𾚺	𾚻	𾚼	𾚽	𾚾	𾚿
U+3E6Cx	𾛀	𾛁	𾛂	𾛃	𾛄	𾛅	𾛆	𾛇	𾛈	𾛉	𾛊	𾛋	𾛌	𾛍	𾛎	𾛏
U+3E6Dx	𾛐	𾛑	𾛒	𾛓	𾛔	𾛕	𾛖	𾛗	𾛘	𾛙	𾛚	𾛛	𾛜	𾛝	𾛞	𾛟
U+3E6Ex	𾛠	𾛡	𾛢	𾛣	𾛤	𾛥	𾛦	𾛧	𾛨	𾛩	𾛪	𾛫	𾛬	𾛭	𾛮	𾛯
U+3E6Fx	𾛰	𾛱	𾛲	𾛳	𾛴	𾛵	𾛶	𾛷	𾛸	𾛹	𾛺	𾛻	𾛼	𾛽	𾛾	𾛿
U+3E70x	𾜀	𾜁	𾜂	𾜃	𾜄	𾜅	𾜆	𾜇	𾜈	𾜉	𾜊	𾜋	𾜌	𾜍	𾜎	𾜏
U+3E71x	𾜐	𾜑	𾜒	𾜓	𾜔	𾜕	𾜖	𾜗	𾜘	𾜙	𾜚	𾜛	𾜜	𾜝	𾜞	𾜟
U+3E72x	𾜠	𾜡	𾜢	𾜣	𾜤	𾜥	𾜦	𾜧	𾜨	𾜩	𾜪	𾜫	𾜬	𾜭	𾜮	𾜯
U+3E73x	𾜰	𾜱	𾜲	𾜳	𾜴	𾜵	𾜶	𾜷	𾜸	𾜹	𾜺	𾜻	𾜼	𾜽	𾜾	𾜿
U+3E74x	𾝀	𾝁	𾝂	𾝃	𾝄	𾝅	𾝆	𾝇	𾝈	𾝉	𾝊	𾝋	𾝌	𾝍	𾝎	𾝏
U+3E75x	𾝐	𾝑	𾝒	𾝓	𾝔	𾝕	𾝖	𾝗	𾝘	𾝙	𾝚	𾝛	𾝜	𾝝	𾝞	𾝟
U+3E76x	𾝠	𾝡	𾝢	𾝣	𾝤	𾝥	𾝦	𾝧	𾝨	𾝩	𾝪	𾝫	𾝬	𾝭	𾝮	𾝯
U+3E77x	𾝰	𾝱	𾝲	𾝳	𾝴	𾝵	𾝶	𾝷	𾝸	𾝹	𾝺	𾝻	𾝼	𾝽	𾝾	𾝿
U+3E78x	𾞀	𾞁	𾞂	𾞃	𾞄	𾞅	𾞆	𾞇	𾞈	𾞉	𾞊	𾞋	𾞌	𾞍	𾞎	𾞏
U+3E79x	𾞐	𾞑	𾞒	𾞓	𾞔	𾞕	𾞖	𾞗	𾞘	𾞙	𾞚	𾞛	𾞜	𾞝	𾞞	𾞟
U+3E7Ax	𾞠	𾞡	𾞢	𾞣	𾞤	𾞥	𾞦	𾞧	𾞨	𾞩	𾞪	𾞫	𾞬	𾞭	𾞮	𾞯
U+3E7Bx	𾞰	𾞱	𾞲	𾞳	𾞴	𾞵	𾞶	𾞷	𾞸	𾞹	𾞺	𾞻	𾞼	𾞽	𾞾	𾞿
U+3E7Cx	𾟀	𾟁	𾟂	𾟃	𾟄	𾟅	𾟆	𾟇	𾟈	𾟉	𾟊	𾟋	𾟌	𾟍	𾟎	𾟏
U+3E7Dx	𾟐	𾟑	𾟒	𾟓	𾟔	𾟕	𾟖	𾟗	𾟘	𾟙	𾟚	𾟛	𾟜	𾟝	𾟞	𾟟
U+3E7Ex	𾟠	𾟡	𾟢	𾟣	𾟤	𾟥	𾟦	𾟧	𾟨	𾟩	𾟪	𾟫	𾟬	𾟭	𾟮	𾟯
U+3E7Fx	𾟰	𾟱	𾟲	𾟳	𾟴	𾟵	𾟶	𾟷	𾟸	𾟹	𾟺	𾟻	𾟼	𾟽	𾟾	𾟿
U+3E80x	𾠀	𾠁	𾠂	𾠃	𾠄	𾠅	𾠆	𾠇	𾠈	𾠉	𾠊	𾠋	𾠌	𾠍	𾠎	𾠏
U+3E81x	𾠐	𾠑	𾠒	𾠓	𾠔	𾠕	𾠖	𾠗	𾠘	𾠙	𾠚	𾠛	𾠜	𾠝	𾠞	𾠟
U+3E82x	𾠠	𾠡	𾠢	𾠣	𾠤	𾠥	𾠦	𾠧	𾠨	𾠩	𾠪	𾠫	𾠬	𾠭	𾠮	𾠯
U+3E83x	𾠰	𾠱	𾠲	𾠳	𾠴	𾠵	𾠶	𾠷	𾠸	𾠹	𾠺	𾠻	𾠼	𾠽	𾠾	𾠿
U+3E84x	𾡀	𾡁	𾡂	𾡃	𾡄	𾡅	𾡆	𾡇	𾡈	𾡉	𾡊	𾡋	𾡌	𾡍	𾡎	𾡏
U+3E85x	𾡐	𾡑	𾡒	𾡓	𾡔	𾡕	𾡖	𾡗	𾡘	𾡙	𾡚	𾡛	𾡜	𾡝	𾡞	𾡟
U+3E86x	𾡠	𾡡	𾡢	𾡣	𾡤	𾡥	𾡦	𾡧	𾡨	𾡩	𾡪	𾡫	𾡬	𾡭	𾡮	𾡯
U+3E87x	𾡰	𾡱	𾡲	𾡳	𾡴	𾡵	𾡶	𾡷	𾡸	𾡹	𾡺	𾡻	𾡼	𾡽	𾡾	𾡿
U+3E88x	𾢀	𾢁	𾢂	𾢃	𾢄	𾢅	𾢆	𾢇	𾢈	𾢉	𾢊	𾢋	𾢌	𾢍	𾢎	𾢏
U+3E89x	𾢐	𾢑	𾢒	𾢓	𾢔	𾢕	𾢖	𾢗	𾢘	𾢙	𾢚	𾢛	𾢜	𾢝	𾢞	𾢟
U+3E8Ax	𾢠	𾢡	𾢢	𾢣	𾢤	𾢥	𾢦	𾢧	𾢨	𾢩	𾢪	𾢫	𾢬	𾢭	𾢮	𾢯
U+3E8Bx	𾢰	𾢱	𾢲	𾢳	𾢴	𾢵	𾢶	𾢷	𾢸	𾢹	𾢺	𾢻	𾢼	𾢽	𾢾	𾢿
U+3E8Cx	𾣀	𾣁	𾣂	𾣃	𾣄	𾣅	𾣆	𾣇	𾣈	𾣉	𾣊	𾣋	𾣌	𾣍	𾣎	𾣏
U+3E8Dx	𾣐	𾣑	𾣒	𾣓	𾣔	𾣕	𾣖	𾣗	𾣘	𾣙	𾣚	𾣛	𾣜	𾣝	𾣞	𾣟
U+3E8Ex	𾣠	𾣡	𾣢	𾣣	𾣤	𾣥	𾣦	𾣧	𾣨	𾣩	𾣪	𾣫	𾣬	𾣭	𾣮	𾣯
U+3E8Fx	𾣰	𾣱	𾣲	𾣳	𾣴	𾣵	𾣶	𾣷	𾣸	𾣹	𾣺	𾣻	𾣼	𾣽	𾣾	𾣿
U+3E90x	𾤀	𾤁	𾤂	𾤃	𾤄	𾤅	𾤆	𾤇	𾤈	𾤉	𾤊	𾤋	𾤌	𾤍	𾤎	𾤏
U+3E91x	𾤐	𾤑	𾤒	𾤓	𾤔	𾤕	𾤖	𾤗	𾤘	𾤙	𾤚	𾤛	𾤜	𾤝	𾤞	𾤟
U+3E92x	𾤠	𾤡	𾤢	𾤣	𾤤	𾤥	𾤦	𾤧	𾤨	𾤩	𾤪	𾤫	𾤬	𾤭	𾤮	𾤯
U+3E93x	𾤰	𾤱	𾤲	𾤳	𾤴	𾤵	𾤶	𾤷	𾤸	𾤹	𾤺	𾤻	𾤼	𾤽	𾤾	𾤿
U+3E94x	𾥀	𾥁	𾥂	𾥃	𾥄	𾥅	𾥆	𾥇	𾥈	𾥉	𾥊	𾥋	𾥌	𾥍	𾥎	𾥏
U+3E95x	𾥐	𾥑	𾥒	𾥓	𾥔	𾥕	𾥖	𾥗	𾥘	𾥙	𾥚	𾥛	𾥜	𾥝	𾥞	𾥟
U+3E96x	𾥠	𾥡	𾥢	𾥣	𾥤	𾥥	𾥦	𾥧	𾥨	𾥩	𾥪	𾥫	𾥬	𾥭	𾥮	𾥯
U+3E97x	𾥰	𾥱	𾥲	𾥳	𾥴	𾥵	𾥶	𾥷	𾥸	𾥹	𾥺	𾥻	𾥼	𾥽	𾥾	𾥿
U+3E98x	𾦀	𾦁	𾦂	𾦃	𾦄	𾦅	𾦆	𾦇	𾦈	𾦉	𾦊	𾦋	𾦌	𾦍	𾦎	𾦏
U+3E99x	𾦐	𾦑	𾦒	𾦓	𾦔	𾦕	𾦖	𾦗	𾦘	𾦙	𾦚	𾦛	𾦜	𾦝	𾦞	𾦟
U+3E9Ax	𾦠	𾦡	𾦢	𾦣	𾦤	𾦥	𾦦	𾦧	𾦨	𾦩	𾦪	𾦫	𾦬	𾦭	𾦮	𾦯
U+3E9Bx	𾦰	𾦱	𾦲	𾦳	𾦴	𾦵	𾦶	𾦷	𾦸	𾦹	𾦺	𾦻	𾦼	𾦽	𾦾	𾦿
U+3E9Cx	𾧀	𾧁	𾧂	𾧃	𾧄	𾧅	𾧆	𾧇	𾧈	𾧉	𾧊	𾧋	𾧌	𾧍	𾧎	𾧏
U+3E9Dx	𾧐	𾧑	𾧒	𾧓	𾧔	𾧕	𾧖	𾧗	𾧘	𾧙	𾧚	𾧛	𾧜	𾧝	𾧞	𾧟
U+3E9Ex	𾧠	𾧡	𾧢	𾧣	𾧤	𾧥	𾧦	𾧧	𾧨	𾧩	𾧪	𾧫	𾧬	𾧭	𾧮	𾧯
U+3E9Fx	𾧰	𾧱	𾧲	𾧳	𾧴	𾧵	𾧶	𾧷	𾧸	𾧹	𾧺	𾧻	𾧼	𾧽	𾧾	𾧿
U+3EA0x	𾨀	𾨁	𾨂	𾨃	𾨄	𾨅	𾨆	𾨇	𾨈	𾨉	𾨊	𾨋	𾨌	𾨍	𾨎	𾨏
U+3EA1x	𾨐	𾨑	𾨒	𾨓	𾨔	𾨕	𾨖	𾨗	𾨘	𾨙	𾨚	𾨛	𾨜	𾨝	𾨞	𾨟
U+3EA2x	𾨠	𾨡	𾨢	𾨣	𾨤	𾨥	𾨦	𾨧	𾨨	𾨩	𾨪	𾨫	𾨬	𾨭	𾨮	𾨯
U+3EA3x	𾨰	𾨱	𾨲	𾨳	𾨴	𾨵	𾨶	𾨷	𾨸	𾨹	𾨺	𾨻	𾨼	𾨽	𾨾	𾨿
U+3EA4x	𾩀	𾩁	𾩂	𾩃	𾩄	𾩅	𾩆	𾩇	𾩈	𾩉	𾩊	𾩋	𾩌	𾩍	𾩎	𾩏
U+3EA5x	𾩐	𾩑	𾩒	𾩓	𾩔	𾩕	𾩖	𾩗	𾩘	𾩙	𾩚	𾩛	𾩜	𾩝	𾩞	𾩟
U+3EA6x	𾩠	𾩡	𾩢	𾩣	𾩤	𾩥	𾩦	𾩧	𾩨	𾩩	𾩪	𾩫	𾩬	𾩭	𾩮	𾩯
U+3EA7x	𾩰	𾩱	𾩲	𾩳	𾩴	𾩵	𾩶	𾩷	𾩸	𾩹	𾩺	𾩻	𾩼	𾩽	𾩾	𾩿
U+3EA8x	𾪀	𾪁	𾪂	𾪃	𾪄	𾪅	𾪆	𾪇	𾪈	𾪉	𾪊	𾪋	𾪌	𾪍	𾪎	𾪏
U+3EA9x	𾪐	𾪑	𾪒	𾪓	𾪔	𾪕	𾪖	𾪗	𾪘	𾪙	𾪚	𾪛	𾪜	𾪝	𾪞	𾪟
U+3EAAx	𾪠	𾪡	𾪢	𾪣	𾪤	𾪥	𾪦	𾪧	𾪨	𾪩	𾪪	𾪫	𾪬	𾪭	𾪮	𾪯
U+3EABx	𾪰	𾪱	𾪲	𾪳	𾪴	𾪵	𾪶	𾪷	𾪸	𾪹	𾪺	𾪻	𾪼	𾪽	𾪾	𾪿
U+3EACx	𾫀	𾫁	𾫂	𾫃	𾫄	𾫅	𾫆	𾫇	𾫈	𾫉	𾫊	𾫋	𾫌	𾫍	𾫎	𾫏
U+3EADx	𾫐	𾫑	𾫒	𾫓	𾫔	𾫕	𾫖	𾫗	𾫘	𾫙	𾫚	𾫛	𾫜	𾫝	𾫞	𾫟
U+3EAEx	𾫠	𾫡	𾫢	𾫣	𾫤	𾫥	𾫦	𾫧	𾫨	𾫩	𾫪	𾫫	𾫬	𾫭	𾫮	𾫯
U+3EAFx	𾫰	𾫱	𾫲	𾫳	𾫴	𾫵	𾫶	𾫷	𾫸	𾫹	𾫺	𾫻	𾫼	𾫽	𾫾	𾫿
U+3EB0x	𾬀	𾬁	𾬂	𾬃	𾬄	𾬅	𾬆	𾬇	𾬈	𾬉	𾬊	𾬋	𾬌	𾬍	𾬎	𾬏
U+3EB1x	𾬐	𾬑	𾬒	𾬓	𾬔	𾬕	𾬖	𾬗	𾬘	𾬙	𾬚	𾬛	𾬜	𾬝	𾬞	𾬟
U+3EB2x	𾬠	𾬡	𾬢	𾬣	𾬤	𾬥	𾬦	𾬧	𾬨	𾬩	𾬪	𾬫	𾬬	𾬭	𾬮	𾬯
U+3EB3x	𾬰	𾬱	𾬲	𾬳	𾬴	𾬵	𾬶	𾬷	𾬸	𾬹	𾬺	𾬻	𾬼	𾬽	𾬾	𾬿
U+3EB4x	𾭀	𾭁	𾭂	𾭃	𾭄	𾭅	𾭆	𾭇	𾭈	𾭉	𾭊	𾭋	𾭌	𾭍	𾭎	𾭏
U+3EB5x	𾭐	𾭑	𾭒	𾭓	𾭔	𾭕	𾭖	𾭗	𾭘	𾭙	𾭚	𾭛	𾭜	𾭝	𾭞	𾭟
U+3EB6x	𾭠	𾭡	𾭢	𾭣	𾭤	𾭥	𾭦	𾭧	𾭨	𾭩	𾭪	𾭫	𾭬	𾭭	𾭮	𾭯
U+3EB7x	𾭰	𾭱	𾭲	𾭳	𾭴	𾭵	𾭶	𾭷	𾭸	𾭹	𾭺	𾭻	𾭼	𾭽	𾭾	𾭿
U+3EB8x	𾮀	𾮁	𾮂	𾮃	𾮄	𾮅	𾮆	𾮇	𾮈	𾮉	𾮊	𾮋	𾮌	𾮍	𾮎	𾮏
U+3EB9x	𾮐	𾮑	𾮒	𾮓	𾮔	𾮕	𾮖	𾮗	𾮘	𾮙	𾮚	𾮛	𾮜	𾮝	𾮞	𾮟
U+3EBAx	𾮠	𾮡	𾮢	𾮣	𾮤	𾮥	𾮦	𾮧	𾮨	𾮩	𾮪	𾮫	𾮬	𾮭	𾮮	𾮯
U+3EBBx	𾮰	𾮱	𾮲	𾮳	𾮴	𾮵	𾮶	𾮷	𾮸	𾮹	𾮺	𾮻	𾮼	𾮽	𾮾	𾮿
U+3EBCx	𾯀	𾯁	𾯂	𾯃	𾯄	𾯅	𾯆	𾯇	𾯈	𾯉	𾯊	𾯋	𾯌	𾯍	𾯎	𾯏
U+3EBDx	𾯐	𾯑	𾯒	𾯓	𾯔	𾯕	𾯖	𾯗	𾯘	𾯙	𾯚	𾯛	𾯜	𾯝	𾯞	𾯟
U+3EBEx	𾯠	𾯡	𾯢	𾯣	𾯤	𾯥	𾯦	𾯧	𾯨	𾯩	𾯪	𾯫	𾯬	𾯭	𾯮	𾯯
U+3EBFx	𾯰	𾯱	𾯲	𾯳	𾯴	𾯵	𾯶	𾯷	𾯸	𾯹	𾯺	𾯻	𾯼	𾯽	𾯾	𾯿
U+3EC0x	𾰀	𾰁	𾰂	𾰃	𾰄	𾰅	𾰆	𾰇	𾰈	𾰉	𾰊	𾰋	𾰌	𾰍	𾰎	𾰏
U+3EC1x	𾰐	𾰑	𾰒	𾰓	𾰔	𾰕	𾰖	𾰗	𾰘	𾰙	𾰚	𾰛	𾰜	𾰝	𾰞	𾰟
U+3EC2x	𾰠	𾰡	𾰢	𾰣	𾰤	𾰥	𾰦	𾰧	𾰨	𾰩	𾰪	𾰫	𾰬	𾰭	𾰮	𾰯
U+3EC3x	𾰰	𾰱	𾰲	𾰳	𾰴	𾰵	𾰶	𾰷	𾰸	𾰹	𾰺	𾰻	𾰼	𾰽	𾰾	𾰿
U+3EC4x	𾱀	𾱁	𾱂	𾱃	𾱄	𾱅	𾱆	𾱇	𾱈	𾱉	𾱊	𾱋	𾱌	𾱍	𾱎	𾱏
U+3EC5x	𾱐	𾱑	𾱒	𾱓	𾱔	𾱕	𾱖	𾱗	𾱘	𾱙	𾱚	𾱛	𾱜	𾱝	𾱞	𾱟
U+3EC6x	𾱠	𾱡	𾱢	𾱣	𾱤	𾱥	𾱦	𾱧	𾱨	𾱩	𾱪	𾱫	𾱬	𾱭	𾱮	𾱯
U+3EC7x	𾱰	𾱱	𾱲	𾱳	𾱴	𾱵	𾱶	𾱷	𾱸	𾱹	𾱺	𾱻	𾱼	𾱽	𾱾	𾱿
U+3EC8x	𾲀	𾲁	𾲂	𾲃	𾲄	𾲅	𾲆	𾲇	𾲈	𾲉	𾲊	𾲋	𾲌	𾲍	𾲎	𾲏
U+3EC9x	𾲐	𾲑	𾲒	𾲓	𾲔	𾲕	𾲖	𾲗	𾲘	𾲙	𾲚	𾲛	𾲜	𾲝	𾲞	𾲟
U+3ECAx	𾲠	𾲡	𾲢	𾲣	𾲤	𾲥	𾲦	𾲧	𾲨	𾲩	𾲪	𾲫	𾲬	𾲭	𾲮	𾲯
U+3ECBx	𾲰	𾲱	𾲲	𾲳	𾲴	𾲵	𾲶	𾲷	𾲸	𾲹	𾲺	𾲻	𾲼	𾲽	𾲾	𾲿
U+3ECCx	𾳀	𾳁	𾳂	𾳃	𾳄	𾳅	𾳆	𾳇	𾳈	𾳉	𾳊	𾳋	𾳌	𾳍	𾳎	𾳏
U+3ECDx	𾳐	𾳑	𾳒	𾳓	𾳔	𾳕	𾳖	𾳗	𾳘	𾳙	𾳚	𾳛	𾳜	𾳝	𾳞	𾳟
U+3ECEx	𾳠	𾳡	𾳢	𾳣	𾳤	𾳥	𾳦	𾳧	𾳨	𾳩	𾳪	𾳫	𾳬	𾳭	𾳮	𾳯
U+3ECFx	𾳰	𾳱	𾳲	𾳳	𾳴	𾳵	𾳶	𾳷	𾳸	𾳹	𾳺	𾳻	𾳼	𾳽	𾳾	𾳿
U+3ED0x	𾴀	𾴁	𾴂	𾴃	𾴄	𾴅	𾴆	𾴇	𾴈	𾴉	𾴊	𾴋	𾴌	𾴍	𾴎	𾴏
U+3ED1x	𾴐	𾴑	𾴒	𾴓	𾴔	𾴕	𾴖	𾴗	𾴘	𾴙	𾴚	𾴛	𾴜	𾴝	𾴞	𾴟
U+3ED2x	𾴠	𾴡	𾴢	𾴣	𾴤	𾴥	𾴦	𾴧	𾴨	𾴩	𾴪	𾴫	𾴬	𾴭	𾴮	𾴯
U+3ED3x	𾴰	𾴱	𾴲	𾴳	𾴴	𾴵	𾴶	𾴷	𾴸	𾴹	𾴺	𾴻	𾴼	𾴽	𾴾	𾴿
U+3ED4x	𾵀	𾵁	𾵂	𾵃	𾵄	𾵅	𾵆	𾵇	𾵈	𾵉	𾵊	𾵋	𾵌	𾵍	𾵎	𾵏
U+3ED5x	𾵐	𾵑	𾵒	𾵓	𾵔	𾵕	𾵖	𾵗	𾵘	𾵙	𾵚	𾵛	𾵜	𾵝	𾵞	𾵟
U+3ED6x	𾵠	𾵡	𾵢	𾵣	𾵤	𾵥	𾵦	𾵧	𾵨	𾵩	𾵪	𾵫	𾵬	𾵭	𾵮	𾵯
U+3ED7x	𾵰	𾵱	𾵲	𾵳	𾵴	𾵵	𾵶	𾵷	𾵸	𾵹	𾵺	𾵻	𾵼	𾵽	𾵾	𾵿
U+3ED8x	𾶀	𾶁	𾶂	𾶃	𾶄	𾶅	𾶆	𾶇	𾶈	𾶉	𾶊	𾶋	𾶌	𾶍	𾶎	𾶏
U+3ED9x	𾶐	𾶑	𾶒	𾶓	𾶔	𾶕	𾶖	𾶗	𾶘	𾶙	𾶚	𾶛	𾶜	𾶝	𾶞	𾶟
U+3EDAx	𾶠	𾶡	𾶢	𾶣	𾶤	𾶥	𾶦	𾶧	𾶨	𾶩	𾶪	𾶫	𾶬	𾶭	𾶮	𾶯
U+3EDBx	𾶰	𾶱	𾶲	𾶳	𾶴	𾶵	𾶶	𾶷	𾶸	𾶹	𾶺	𾶻	𾶼	𾶽	𾶾	𾶿
U+3EDCx	𾷀	𾷁	𾷂	𾷃	𾷄	𾷅	𾷆	𾷇	𾷈	𾷉	𾷊	𾷋	𾷌	𾷍	𾷎	𾷏
U+3EDDx	𾷐	𾷑	𾷒	𾷓	𾷔	𾷕	𾷖	𾷗	𾷘	𾷙	𾷚	𾷛	𾷜	𾷝	𾷞	𾷟
U+3EDEx	𾷠	𾷡	𾷢	𾷣	𾷤	𾷥	𾷦	𾷧	𾷨	𾷩	𾷪	𾷫	𾷬	𾷭	𾷮	𾷯
U+3EDFx	𾷰	𾷱	𾷲	𾷳	𾷴	𾷵	𾷶	𾷷	𾷸	𾷹	𾷺	𾷻	𾷼	𾷽	𾷾	𾷿
U+3EE0x	𾸀	𾸁	𾸂	𾸃	𾸄	𾸅	𾸆	𾸇	𾸈	𾸉	𾸊	𾸋	𾸌	𾸍	𾸎	𾸏
U+3EE1x	𾸐	𾸑	𾸒	𾸓	𾸔	𾸕	𾸖	𾸗	𾸘	𾸙	𾸚	𾸛	𾸜	𾸝	𾸞	𾸟
U+3EE2x	𾸠	𾸡	𾸢	𾸣	𾸤	𾸥	𾸦	𾸧	𾸨	𾸩	𾸪	𾸫	𾸬	𾸭	𾸮	𾸯
U+3EE3x	𾸰	𾸱	𾸲	𾸳	𾸴	𾸵	𾸶	𾸷	𾸸	𾸹	𾸺	𾸻	𾸼	𾸽	𾸾	𾸿
U+3EE4x	𾹀	𾹁	𾹂	𾹃	𾹄	𾹅	𾹆	𾹇	𾹈	𾹉	𾹊	𾹋	𾹌	𾹍	𾹎	𾹏
U+3EE5x	𾹐	𾹑	𾹒	𾹓	𾹔	𾹕	𾹖	𾹗	𾹘	𾹙	𾹚	𾹛	𾹜	𾹝	𾹞	𾹟
U+3EE6x	𾹠	𾹡	𾹢	𾹣	𾹤	𾹥	𾹦	𾹧	𾹨	𾹩	𾹪	𾹫	𾹬	𾹭	𾹮	𾹯
U+3EE7x	𾹰	𾹱	𾹲	𾹳	𾹴	𾹵	𾹶	𾹷	𾹸	𾹹	𾹺	𾹻	𾹼	𾹽	𾹾	𾹿
U+3EE8x	𾺀	𾺁	𾺂	𾺃	𾺄	𾺅	𾺆	𾺇	𾺈	𾺉	𾺊	𾺋	𾺌	𾺍	𾺎	𾺏
U+3EE9x	𾺐	𾺑	𾺒	𾺓	𾺔	𾺕	𾺖	𾺗	𾺘	𾺙	𾺚	𾺛	𾺜	𾺝	𾺞	𾺟
U+3EEAx	𾺠	𾺡	𾺢	𾺣	𾺤	𾺥	𾺦	𾺧	𾺨	𾺩	𾺪	𾺫	𾺬	𾺭	𾺮	𾺯
U+3EEBx	𾺰	𾺱	𾺲	𾺳	𾺴	𾺵	𾺶	𾺷	𾺸	𾺹	𾺺	𾺻	𾺼	𾺽	𾺾	𾺿
U+3EECx	𾻀	𾻁	𾻂	𾻃	𾻄	𾻅	𾻆	𾻇	𾻈	𾻉	𾻊	𾻋	𾻌	𾻍	𾻎	𾻏
U+3EEDx	𾻐	𾻑	𾻒	𾻓	𾻔	𾻕	𾻖	𾻗	𾻘	𾻙	𾻚	𾻛	𾻜	𾻝	𾻞	𾻟
U+3EEEx	𾻠	𾻡	𾻢	𾻣	𾻤	𾻥	𾻦	𾻧	𾻨	𾻩	𾻪	𾻫	𾻬	𾻭	𾻮	𾻯
U+3EEFx	𾻰	𾻱	𾻲	𾻳	𾻴	𾻵	𾻶	𾻷	𾻸	𾻹	𾻺	𾻻	𾻼	𾻽	𾻾	𾻿
U+3EF0x	𾼀	𾼁	𾼂	𾼃	𾼄	𾼅	𾼆	𾼇	𾼈	𾼉	𾼊	𾼋	𾼌	𾼍	𾼎	𾼏
U+3EF1x	𾼐	𾼑	𾼒	𾼓	𾼔	𾼕	𾼖	𾼗	𾼘	𾼙	𾼚	𾼛	𾼜	𾼝	𾼞	𾼟
U+3EF2x	𾼠	𾼡	𾼢	𾼣	𾼤	𾼥	𾼦	𾼧	𾼨	𾼩	𾼪	𾼫	𾼬	𾼭	𾼮	𾼯
U+3EF3x	𾼰	𾼱	𾼲	𾼳	𾼴	𾼵	𾼶	𾼷	𾼸	𾼹	𾼺	𾼻	𾼼	𾼽	𾼾	𾼿
U+3EF4x	𾽀	𾽁	𾽂	𾽃	𾽄	𾽅	𾽆	𾽇	𾽈	𾽉	𾽊	𾽋	𾽌	𾽍	𾽎	𾽏
U+3EF5x	𾽐	𾽑	𾽒	𾽓	𾽔	𾽕	𾽖	𾽗	𾽘	𾽙	𾽚	𾽛	𾽜	𾽝	𾽞	𾽟
U+3EF6x	𾽠	𾽡	𾽢	𾽣	𾽤	𾽥	𾽦	𾽧	𾽨	𾽩	𾽪	𾽫	𾽬	𾽭	𾽮	𾽯
U+3EF7x	𾽰	𾽱	𾽲	𾽳	𾽴	𾽵	𾽶	𾽷	𾽸	𾽹	𾽺	𾽻	𾽼	𾽽	𾽾	𾽿
U+3EF8x	𾾀	𾾁	𾾂	𾾃	𾾄	𾾅	𾾆	𾾇	𾾈	𾾉	𾾊	𾾋	𾾌	𾾍	𾾎	𾾏
U+3EF9x	𾾐	𾾑	𾾒	𾾓	𾾔	𾾕	𾾖	𾾗	𾾘	𾾙	𾾚	𾾛	𾾜	𾾝	𾾞	𾾟
U+3EFAx	𾾠	𾾡	𾾢	𾾣	𾾤	𾾥	𾾦	𾾧	𾾨	𾾩	𾾪	𾾫	𾾬	𾾭	𾾮	𾾯
U+3EFBx	𾾰	𾾱	𾾲	𾾳	𾾴	𾾵	𾾶	𾾷	𾾸	𾾹	𾾺	𾾻	𾾼	𾾽	𾾾	𾾿
U+3EFCx	𾿀	𾿁	𾿂	𾿃	𾿄	𾿅	𾿆	𾿇	𾿈	𾿉	𾿊	𾿋	𾿌	𾿍	𾿎	𾿏
U+3EFDx	𾿐	𾿑	𾿒	𾿓	𾿔	𾿕	𾿖	𾿗	𾿘	𾿙	𾿚	𾿛	𾿜	𾿝	𾿞	𾿟
U+3EFEx	𾿠	𾿡	𾿢	𾿣	𾿤	𾿥	𾿦	𾿧	𾿨	𾿩	𾿪	𾿫	𾿬	𾿭	𾿮	𾿯
U+3EFFx	𾿰	𾿱	𾿲	𾿳	𾿴	𾿵	𾿶	𾿷	𾿸	𾿹	𾿺	𾿻	𾿼	𾿽	𾿾	𾿿
U+3F00x	𿀀	𿀁	𿀂	𿀃	𿀄	𿀅	𿀆	𿀇	𿀈	𿀉	𿀊	𿀋	𿀌	𿀍	𿀎	𿀏
U+3F01x	𿀐	𿀑	𿀒	𿀓	𿀔	𿀕	𿀖	𿀗	𿀘	𿀙	𿀚	𿀛	𿀜	𿀝	𿀞	𿀟
U+3F02x	𿀠	𿀡	𿀢	𿀣	𿀤	𿀥	𿀦	𿀧	𿀨	𿀩	𿀪	𿀫	𿀬	𿀭	𿀮	𿀯
U+3F03x	𿀰	𿀱	𿀲	𿀳	𿀴	𿀵	𿀶	𿀷	𿀸	𿀹	𿀺	𿀻	𿀼	𿀽	𿀾	𿀿
U+3F04x	𿁀	𿁁	𿁂	𿁃	𿁄	𿁅	𿁆	𿁇	𿁈	𿁉	𿁊	𿁋	𿁌	𿁍	𿁎	𿁏
U+3F05x	𿁐	𿁑	𿁒	𿁓	𿁔	𿁕	𿁖	𿁗	𿁘	𿁙	𿁚	𿁛	𿁜	𿁝	𿁞	𿁟
U+3F06x	𿁠	𿁡	𿁢	𿁣	𿁤	𿁥	𿁦	𿁧	𿁨	𿁩	𿁪	𿁫	𿁬	𿁭	𿁮	𿁯
U+3F07x	𿁰	𿁱	𿁲	𿁳	𿁴	𿁵	𿁶	𿁷	𿁸	𿁹	𿁺	𿁻	𿁼	𿁽	𿁾	𿁿
U+3F08x	𿂀	𿂁	𿂂	𿂃	𿂄	𿂅	𿂆	𿂇	𿂈	𿂉	𿂊	𿂋	𿂌	𿂍	𿂎	𿂏
U+3F09x	𿂐	𿂑	𿂒	𿂓	𿂔	𿂕	𿂖	𿂗	𿂘	𿂙	𿂚	𿂛	𿂜	𿂝	𿂞	𿂟
U+3F0Ax	𿂠	𿂡	𿂢	𿂣	𿂤	𿂥	𿂦	𿂧	𿂨	𿂩	𿂪	𿂫	𿂬	𿂭	𿂮	𿂯
U+3F0Bx	𿂰	𿂱	𿂲	𿂳	𿂴	𿂵	𿂶	𿂷	𿂸	𿂹	𿂺	𿂻	𿂼	𿂽	𿂾	𿂿
U+3F0Cx	𿃀	𿃁	𿃂	𿃃	𿃄	𿃅	𿃆	𿃇	𿃈	𿃉	𿃊	𿃋	𿃌	𿃍	𿃎	𿃏
U+3F0Dx	𿃐	𿃑	𿃒	𿃓	𿃔	𿃕	𿃖	𿃗	𿃘	𿃙	𿃚	𿃛	𿃜	𿃝	𿃞	𿃟
U+3F0Ex	𿃠	𿃡	𿃢	𿃣	𿃤	𿃥	𿃦	𿃧	𿃨	𿃩	𿃪	𿃫	𿃬	𿃭	𿃮	𿃯
U+3F0Fx	𿃰	𿃱	𿃲	𿃳	𿃴	𿃵	𿃶	𿃷	𿃸	𿃹	𿃺	𿃻	𿃼	𿃽	𿃾	𿃿
U+3F10x	𿄀	𿄁	𿄂	𿄃	𿄄	𿄅	𿄆	𿄇	𿄈	𿄉	𿄊	𿄋	𿄌	𿄍	𿄎	𿄏
U+3F11x	𿄐	𿄑	𿄒	𿄓	𿄔	𿄕	𿄖	𿄗	𿄘	𿄙	𿄚	𿄛	𿄜	𿄝	𿄞	𿄟
U+3F12x	𿄠	𿄡	𿄢	𿄣	𿄤	𿄥	𿄦	𿄧	𿄨	𿄩	𿄪	𿄫	𿄬	𿄭	𿄮	𿄯
U+3F13x	𿄰	𿄱	𿄲	𿄳	𿄴	𿄵	𿄶	𿄷	𿄸	𿄹	𿄺	𿄻	𿄼	𿄽	𿄾	𿄿
U+3F14x	𿅀	𿅁	𿅂	𿅃	𿅄	𿅅	𿅆	𿅇	𿅈	𿅉	𿅊	𿅋	𿅌	𿅍	𿅎	𿅏
U+3F15x	𿅐	𿅑	𿅒	𿅓	𿅔	𿅕	𿅖	𿅗	𿅘	𿅙	𿅚	𿅛	𿅜	𿅝	𿅞	𿅟
U+3F16x	𿅠	𿅡	𿅢	𿅣	𿅤	𿅥	𿅦	𿅧	𿅨	𿅩	𿅪	𿅫	𿅬	𿅭	𿅮	𿅯
U+3F17x	𿅰	𿅱	𿅲	𿅳	𿅴	𿅵	𿅶	𿅷	𿅸	𿅹	𿅺	𿅻	𿅼	𿅽	𿅾	𿅿
U+3F18x	𿆀	𿆁	𿆂	𿆃	𿆄	𿆅	𿆆	𿆇	𿆈	𿆉	𿆊	𿆋	𿆌	𿆍	𿆎	𿆏
U+3F19x	𿆐	𿆑	𿆒	𿆓	𿆔	𿆕	𿆖	𿆗	𿆘	𿆙	𿆚	𿆛	𿆜	𿆝	𿆞	𿆟
U+3F1Ax	𿆠	𿆡	𿆢	𿆣	𿆤	𿆥	𿆦	𿆧	𿆨	𿆩	𿆪	𿆫	𿆬	𿆭	𿆮	𿆯
U+3F1Bx	𿆰	𿆱	𿆲	𿆳	𿆴	𿆵	𿆶	𿆷	𿆸	𿆹	𿆺	𿆻	𿆼	𿆽	𿆾	𿆿
U+3F1Cx	𿇀	𿇁	𿇂	𿇃	𿇄	𿇅	𿇆	𿇇	𿇈	𿇉	𿇊	𿇋	𿇌	𿇍	𿇎	𿇏
U+3F1Dx	𿇐	𿇑	𿇒	𿇓	𿇔	𿇕	𿇖	𿇗	𿇘	𿇙	𿇚	𿇛	𿇜	𿇝	𿇞	𿇟
U+3F1Ex	𿇠	𿇡	𿇢	𿇣	𿇤	𿇥	𿇦	𿇧	𿇨	𿇩	𿇪	𿇫	𿇬	𿇭	𿇮	𿇯
U+3F1Fx	𿇰	𿇱	𿇲	𿇳	𿇴	𿇵	𿇶	𿇷	𿇸	𿇹	𿇺	𿇻	𿇼	𿇽	𿇾	𿇿
U+3F20x	𿈀	𿈁	𿈂	𿈃	𿈄	𿈅	𿈆	𿈇	𿈈	𿈉	𿈊	𿈋	𿈌	𿈍	𿈎	𿈏
U+3F21x	𿈐	𿈑	𿈒	𿈓	𿈔	𿈕	𿈖	𿈗	𿈘	𿈙	𿈚	𿈛	𿈜	𿈝	𿈞	𿈟
U+3F22x	𿈠	𿈡	𿈢	𿈣	𿈤	𿈥	𿈦	𿈧	𿈨	𿈩	𿈪	𿈫	𿈬	𿈭	𿈮	𿈯
U+3F23x	𿈰	𿈱	𿈲	𿈳	𿈴	𿈵	𿈶	𿈷	𿈸	𿈹	𿈺	𿈻	𿈼	𿈽	𿈾	𿈿
U+3F24x	𿉀	𿉁	𿉂	𿉃	𿉄	𿉅	𿉆	𿉇	𿉈	𿉉	𿉊	𿉋	𿉌	𿉍	𿉎	𿉏
U+3F25x	𿉐	𿉑	𿉒	𿉓	𿉔	𿉕	𿉖	𿉗	𿉘	𿉙	𿉚	𿉛	𿉜	𿉝	𿉞	𿉟
U+3F26x	𿉠	𿉡	𿉢	𿉣	𿉤	𿉥	𿉦	𿉧	𿉨	𿉩	𿉪	𿉫	𿉬	𿉭	𿉮	𿉯
U+3F27x	𿉰	𿉱	𿉲	𿉳	𿉴	𿉵	𿉶	𿉷	𿉸	𿉹	𿉺	𿉻	𿉼	𿉽	𿉾	𿉿
U+3F28x	𿊀	𿊁	𿊂	𿊃	𿊄	𿊅	𿊆	𿊇	𿊈	𿊉	𿊊	𿊋	𿊌	𿊍	𿊎	𿊏
U+3F29x	𿊐	𿊑	𿊒	𿊓	𿊔	𿊕	𿊖	𿊗	𿊘	𿊙	𿊚	𿊛	𿊜	𿊝	𿊞	𿊟
U+3F2Ax	𿊠	𿊡	𿊢	𿊣	𿊤	𿊥	𿊦	𿊧	𿊨	𿊩	𿊪	𿊫	𿊬	𿊭	𿊮	𿊯
U+3F2Bx	𿊰	𿊱	𿊲	𿊳	𿊴	𿊵	𿊶	𿊷	𿊸	𿊹	𿊺	𿊻	𿊼	𿊽	𿊾	𿊿
U+3F2Cx	𿋀	𿋁	𿋂	𿋃	𿋄	𿋅	𿋆	𿋇	𿋈	𿋉	𿋊	𿋋	𿋌	𿋍	𿋎	𿋏
U+3F2Dx	𿋐	𿋑	𿋒	𿋓	𿋔	𿋕	𿋖	𿋗	𿋘	𿋙	𿋚	𿋛	𿋜	𿋝	𿋞	𿋟
U+3F2Ex	𿋠	𿋡	𿋢	𿋣	𿋤	𿋥	𿋦	𿋧	𿋨	𿋩	𿋪	𿋫	𿋬	𿋭	𿋮	𿋯
U+3F2Fx	𿋰	𿋱	𿋲	𿋳	𿋴	𿋵	𿋶	𿋷	𿋸	𿋹	𿋺	𿋻	𿋼	𿋽	𿋾	𿋿
U+3F30x	𿌀	𿌁	𿌂	𿌃	𿌄	𿌅	𿌆	𿌇	𿌈	𿌉	𿌊	𿌋	𿌌	𿌍	𿌎	𿌏
U+3F31x	𿌐	𿌑	𿌒	𿌓	𿌔	𿌕	𿌖	𿌗	𿌘	𿌙	𿌚	𿌛	𿌜	𿌝	𿌞	𿌟
U+3F32x	𿌠	𿌡	𿌢	𿌣	𿌤	𿌥	𿌦	𿌧	𿌨	𿌩	𿌪	𿌫	𿌬	𿌭	𿌮	𿌯
U+3F33x	𿌰	𿌱	𿌲	𿌳	𿌴	𿌵	𿌶	𿌷	𿌸	𿌹	𿌺	𿌻	𿌼	𿌽	𿌾	𿌿
U+3F34x	𿍀	𿍁	𿍂	𿍃	𿍄	𿍅	𿍆	𿍇	𿍈	𿍉	𿍊	𿍋	𿍌	𿍍	𿍎	𿍏
U+3F35x	𿍐	𿍑	𿍒	𿍓	𿍔	𿍕	𿍖	𿍗	𿍘	𿍙	𿍚	𿍛	𿍜	𿍝	𿍞	𿍟
U+3F36x	𿍠	𿍡	𿍢	𿍣	𿍤	𿍥	𿍦	𿍧	𿍨	𿍩	𿍪	𿍫	𿍬	𿍭	𿍮	𿍯
U+3F37x	𿍰	𿍱	𿍲	𿍳	𿍴	𿍵	𿍶	𿍷	𿍸	𿍹	𿍺	𿍻	𿍼	𿍽	𿍾	𿍿
U+3F38x	𿎀	𿎁	𿎂	𿎃	𿎄	𿎅	𿎆	𿎇	𿎈	𿎉	𿎊	𿎋	𿎌	𿎍	𿎎	𿎏
U+3F39x	𿎐	𿎑	𿎒	𿎓	𿎔	𿎕	𿎖	𿎗	𿎘	𿎙	𿎚	𿎛	𿎜	𿎝	𿎞	𿎟
U+3F3Ax	𿎠	𿎡	𿎢	𿎣	𿎤	𿎥	𿎦	𿎧	𿎨	𿎩	𿎪	𿎫	𿎬	𿎭	𿎮	𿎯
U+3F3Bx	𿎰	𿎱	𿎲	𿎳	𿎴	𿎵	𿎶	𿎷	𿎸	𿎹	𿎺	𿎻	𿎼	𿎽	𿎾	𿎿
U+3F3Cx	𿏀	𿏁	𿏂	𿏃	𿏄	𿏅	𿏆	𿏇	𿏈	𿏉	𿏊	𿏋	𿏌	𿏍	𿏎	𿏏
U+3F3Dx	𿏐	𿏑	𿏒	𿏓	𿏔	𿏕	𿏖	𿏗	𿏘	𿏙	𿏚	𿏛	𿏜	𿏝	𿏞	𿏟
U+3F3Ex	𿏠	𿏡	𿏢	𿏣	𿏤	𿏥	𿏦	𿏧	𿏨	𿏩	𿏪	𿏫	𿏬	𿏭	𿏮	𿏯
U+3F3Fx	𿏰	𿏱	𿏲	𿏳	𿏴	𿏵	𿏶	𿏷	𿏸	𿏹	𿏺	𿏻	𿏼	𿏽	𿏾	𿏿
U+3F40x	𿐀	𿐁	𿐂	𿐃	𿐄	𿐅	𿐆	𿐇	𿐈	𿐉	𿐊	𿐋	𿐌	𿐍	𿐎	𿐏
U+3F41x	𿐐	𿐑	𿐒	𿐓	𿐔	𿐕	𿐖	𿐗	𿐘	𿐙	𿐚	𿐛	𿐜	𿐝	𿐞	𿐟
U+3F42x	𿐠	𿐡	𿐢	𿐣	𿐤	𿐥	𿐦	𿐧	𿐨	𿐩	𿐪	𿐫	𿐬	𿐭	𿐮	𿐯
U+3F43x	𿐰	𿐱	𿐲	𿐳	𿐴	𿐵	𿐶	𿐷	𿐸	𿐹	𿐺	𿐻	𿐼	𿐽	𿐾	𿐿
U+3F44x	𿑀	𿑁	𿑂	𿑃	𿑄	𿑅	𿑆	𿑇	𿑈	𿑉	𿑊	𿑋	𿑌	𿑍	𿑎	𿑏
U+3F45x	𿑐	𿑑	𿑒	𿑓	𿑔	𿑕	𿑖	𿑗	𿑘	𿑙	𿑚	𿑛	𿑜	𿑝	𿑞	𿑟
U+3F46x	𿑠	𿑡	𿑢	𿑣	𿑤	𿑥	𿑦	𿑧	𿑨	𿑩	𿑪	𿑫	𿑬	𿑭	𿑮	𿑯
U+3F47x	𿑰	𿑱	𿑲	𿑳	𿑴	𿑵	𿑶	𿑷	𿑸	𿑹	𿑺	𿑻	𿑼	𿑽	𿑾	𿑿
U+3F48x	𿒀	𿒁	𿒂	𿒃	𿒄	𿒅	𿒆	𿒇	𿒈	𿒉	𿒊	𿒋	𿒌	𿒍	𿒎	𿒏
U+3F49x	𿒐	𿒑	𿒒	𿒓	𿒔	𿒕	𿒖	𿒗	𿒘	𿒙	𿒚	𿒛	𿒜	𿒝	𿒞	𿒟
U+3F4Ax	𿒠	𿒡	𿒢	𿒣	𿒤	𿒥	𿒦	𿒧	𿒨	𿒩	𿒪	𿒫	𿒬	𿒭	𿒮	𿒯
U+3F4Bx	𿒰	𿒱	𿒲	𿒳	𿒴	𿒵	𿒶	𿒷	𿒸	𿒹	𿒺	𿒻	𿒼	𿒽	𿒾	𿒿
U+3F4Cx	𿓀	𿓁	𿓂	𿓃	𿓄	𿓅	𿓆	𿓇	𿓈	𿓉	𿓊	𿓋	𿓌	𿓍	𿓎	𿓏
U+3F4Dx	𿓐	𿓑	𿓒	𿓓	𿓔	𿓕	𿓖	𿓗	𿓘	𿓙	𿓚	𿓛	𿓜	𿓝	𿓞	𿓟
U+3F4Ex	𿓠	𿓡	𿓢	𿓣	𿓤	𿓥	𿓦	𿓧	𿓨	𿓩	𿓪	𿓫	𿓬	𿓭	𿓮	𿓯
U+3F4Fx	𿓰	𿓱	𿓲	𿓳	𿓴	𿓵	𿓶	𿓷	𿓸	𿓹	𿓺	𿓻	𿓼	𿓽	𿓾	𿓿
U+3F50x	𿔀	𿔁	𿔂	𿔃	𿔄	𿔅	𿔆	𿔇	𿔈	𿔉	𿔊	𿔋	𿔌	𿔍	𿔎	𿔏
U+3F51x	𿔐	𿔑	𿔒	𿔓	𿔔	𿔕	𿔖	𿔗	𿔘	𿔙	𿔚	𿔛	𿔜	𿔝	𿔞	𿔟
U+3F52x	𿔠	𿔡	𿔢	𿔣	𿔤	𿔥	𿔦	𿔧	𿔨	𿔩	𿔪	𿔫	𿔬	𿔭	𿔮	𿔯
U+3F53x	𿔰	𿔱	𿔲	𿔳	𿔴	𿔵	𿔶	𿔷	𿔸	𿔹	𿔺	𿔻	𿔼	𿔽	𿔾	𿔿
U+3F54x	𿕀	𿕁	𿕂	𿕃	𿕄	𿕅	𿕆	𿕇	𿕈	𿕉	𿕊	𿕋	𿕌	𿕍	𿕎	𿕏
U+3F55x	𿕐	𿕑	𿕒	𿕓	𿕔	𿕕	𿕖	𿕗	𿕘	𿕙	𿕚	𿕛	𿕜	𿕝	𿕞	𿕟
U+3F56x	𿕠	𿕡	𿕢	𿕣	𿕤	𿕥	𿕦	𿕧	𿕨	𿕩	𿕪	𿕫	𿕬	𿕭	𿕮	𿕯
U+3F57x	𿕰	𿕱	𿕲	𿕳	𿕴	𿕵	𿕶	𿕷	𿕸	𿕹	𿕺	𿕻	𿕼	𿕽	𿕾	𿕿
U+3F58x	𿖀	𿖁	𿖂	𿖃	𿖄	𿖅	𿖆	𿖇	𿖈	𿖉	𿖊	𿖋	𿖌	𿖍	𿖎	𿖏
U+3F59x	𿖐	𿖑	𿖒	𿖓	𿖔	𿖕	𿖖	𿖗	𿖘	𿖙	𿖚	𿖛	𿖜	𿖝	𿖞	𿖟
U+3F5Ax	𿖠	𿖡	𿖢	𿖣	𿖤	𿖥	𿖦	𿖧	𿖨	𿖩	𿖪	𿖫	𿖬	𿖭	𿖮	𿖯
U+3F5Bx	𿖰	𿖱	𿖲	𿖳	𿖴	𿖵	𿖶	𿖷	𿖸	𿖹	𿖺	𿖻	𿖼	𿖽	𿖾	𿖿
U+3F5Cx	𿗀	𿗁	𿗂	𿗃	𿗄	𿗅	𿗆	𿗇	𿗈	𿗉	𿗊	𿗋	𿗌	𿗍	𿗎	𿗏
U+3F5Dx	𿗐	𿗑	𿗒	𿗓	𿗔	𿗕	𿗖	𿗗	𿗘	𿗙	𿗚	𿗛	𿗜	𿗝	𿗞	𿗟
U+3F5Ex	𿗠	𿗡	𿗢	𿗣	𿗤	𿗥	𿗦	𿗧	𿗨	𿗩	𿗪	𿗫	𿗬	𿗭	𿗮	𿗯
U+3F5Fx	𿗰	𿗱	𿗲	𿗳	𿗴	𿗵	𿗶	𿗷	𿗸	𿗹	𿗺	𿗻	𿗼	𿗽	𿗾	𿗿
U+3F60x	𿘀	𿘁	𿘂	𿘃	𿘄	𿘅	𿘆	𿘇	𿘈	𿘉	𿘊	𿘋	𿘌	𿘍	𿘎	𿘏
U+3F61x	𿘐	𿘑	𿘒	𿘓	𿘔	𿘕	𿘖	𿘗	𿘘	𿘙	𿘚	𿘛	𿘜	𿘝	𿘞	𿘟
U+3F62x	𿘠	𿘡	𿘢	𿘣	𿘤	𿘥	𿘦	𿘧	𿘨	𿘩	𿘪	𿘫	𿘬	𿘭	𿘮	𿘯
U+3F63x	𿘰	𿘱	𿘲	𿘳	𿘴	𿘵	𿘶	𿘷	𿘸	𿘹	𿘺	𿘻	𿘼	𿘽	𿘾	𿘿
U+3F64x	𿙀	𿙁	𿙂	𿙃	𿙄	𿙅	𿙆	𿙇	𿙈	𿙉	𿙊	𿙋	𿙌	𿙍	𿙎	𿙏
U+3F65x	𿙐	𿙑	𿙒	𿙓	𿙔	𿙕	𿙖	𿙗	𿙘	𿙙	𿙚	𿙛	𿙜	𿙝	𿙞	𿙟
U+3F66x	𿙠	𿙡	𿙢	𿙣	𿙤	𿙥	𿙦	𿙧	𿙨	𿙩	𿙪	𿙫	𿙬	𿙭	𿙮	𿙯
U+3F67x	𿙰	𿙱	𿙲	𿙳	𿙴	𿙵	𿙶	𿙷	𿙸	𿙹	𿙺	𿙻	𿙼	𿙽	𿙾	𿙿
U+3F68x	𿚀	𿚁	𿚂	𿚃	𿚄	𿚅	𿚆	𿚇	𿚈	𿚉	𿚊	𿚋	𿚌	𿚍	𿚎	𿚏
U+3F69x	𿚐	𿚑	𿚒	𿚓	𿚔	𿚕	𿚖	𿚗	𿚘	𿚙	𿚚	𿚛	𿚜	𿚝	𿚞	𿚟
U+3F6Ax	𿚠	𿚡	𿚢	𿚣	𿚤	𿚥	𿚦	𿚧	𿚨	𿚩	𿚪	𿚫	𿚬	𿚭	𿚮	𿚯
U+3F6Bx	𿚰	𿚱	𿚲	𿚳	𿚴	𿚵	𿚶	𿚷	𿚸	𿚹	𿚺	𿚻	𿚼	𿚽	𿚾	𿚿
U+3F6Cx	𿛀	𿛁	𿛂	𿛃	𿛄	𿛅	𿛆	𿛇	𿛈	𿛉	𿛊	𿛋	𿛌	𿛍	𿛎	𿛏
U+3F6Dx	𿛐	𿛑	𿛒	𿛓	𿛔	𿛕	𿛖	𿛗	𿛘	𿛙	𿛚	𿛛	𿛜	𿛝	𿛞	𿛟
U+3F6Ex	𿛠	𿛡	𿛢	𿛣	𿛤	𿛥	𿛦	𿛧	𿛨	𿛩	𿛪	𿛫	𿛬	𿛭	𿛮	𿛯
U+3F6Fx	𿛰	𿛱	𿛲	𿛳	𿛴	𿛵	𿛶	𿛷	𿛸	𿛹	𿛺	𿛻	𿛼	𿛽	𿛾	𿛿
U+3F70x	𿜀	𿜁	𿜂	𿜃	𿜄	𿜅	𿜆	𿜇	𿜈	𿜉	𿜊	𿜋	𿜌	𿜍	𿜎	𿜏
U+3F71x	𿜐	𿜑	𿜒	𿜓	𿜔	𿜕	𿜖	𿜗	𿜘	𿜙	𿜚	𿜛	𿜜	𿜝	𿜞	𿜟
U+3F72x	𿜠	𿜡	𿜢	𿜣	𿜤	𿜥	𿜦	𿜧	𿜨	𿜩	𿜪	𿜫	𿜬	𿜭	𿜮	𿜯
U+3F73x	𿜰	𿜱	𿜲	𿜳	𿜴	𿜵	𿜶	𿜷	𿜸	𿜹	𿜺	𿜻	𿜼	𿜽	𿜾	𿜿
U+3F74x	𿝀	𿝁	𿝂	𿝃	𿝄	𿝅	𿝆	𿝇	𿝈	𿝉	𿝊	𿝋	𿝌	𿝍	𿝎	𿝏
U+3F75x	𿝐	𿝑	𿝒	𿝓	𿝔	𿝕	𿝖	𿝗	𿝘	𿝙	𿝚	𿝛	𿝜	𿝝	𿝞	𿝟
U+3F76x	𿝠	𿝡	𿝢	𿝣	𿝤	𿝥	𿝦	𿝧	𿝨	𿝩	𿝪	𿝫	𿝬	𿝭	𿝮	𿝯
U+3F77x	𿝰	𿝱	𿝲	𿝳	𿝴	𿝵	𿝶	𿝷	𿝸	𿝹	𿝺	𿝻	𿝼	𿝽	𿝾	𿝿
U+3F78x	𿞀	𿞁	𿞂	𿞃	𿞄	𿞅	𿞆	𿞇	𿞈	𿞉	𿞊	𿞋	𿞌	𿞍	𿞎	𿞏
U+3F79x	𿞐	𿞑	𿞒	𿞓	𿞔	𿞕	𿞖	𿞗	𿞘	𿞙	𿞚	𿞛	𿞜	𿞝	𿞞	𿞟
U+3F7Ax	𿞠	𿞡	𿞢	𿞣	𿞤	𿞥	𿞦	𿞧	𿞨	𿞩	𿞪	𿞫	𿞬	𿞭	𿞮	𿞯
U+3F7Bx	𿞰	𿞱	𿞲	𿞳	𿞴	𿞵	𿞶	𿞷	𿞸	𿞹	𿞺	𿞻	𿞼	𿞽	𿞾	𿞿
U+3F7Cx	𿟀	𿟁	𿟂	𿟃	𿟄	𿟅	𿟆	𿟇	𿟈	𿟉	𿟊	𿟋	𿟌	𿟍	𿟎	𿟏
U+3F7Dx	𿟐	𿟑	𿟒	𿟓	𿟔	𿟕	𿟖	𿟗	𿟘	𿟙	𿟚	𿟛	𿟜	𿟝	𿟞	𿟟
U+3F7Ex	𿟠	𿟡	𿟢	𿟣	𿟤	𿟥	𿟦	𿟧	𿟨	𿟩	𿟪	𿟫	𿟬	𿟭	𿟮	𿟯
U+3F7Fx	𿟰	𿟱	𿟲	𿟳	𿟴	𿟵	𿟶	𿟷	𿟸	𿟹	𿟺	𿟻	𿟼	𿟽	𿟾	𿟿
U+3F80x	𿠀	𿠁	𿠂	𿠃	𿠄	𿠅	𿠆	𿠇	𿠈	𿠉	𿠊	𿠋	𿠌	𿠍	𿠎	𿠏
U+3F81x	𿠐	𿠑	𿠒	𿠓	𿠔	𿠕	𿠖	𿠗	𿠘	𿠙	𿠚	𿠛	𿠜	𿠝	𿠞	𿠟
U+3F82x	𿠠	𿠡	𿠢	𿠣	𿠤	𿠥	𿠦	𿠧	𿠨	𿠩	𿠪	𿠫	𿠬	𿠭	𿠮	𿠯
U+3F83x	𿠰	𿠱	𿠲	𿠳	𿠴	𿠵	𿠶	𿠷	𿠸	𿠹	𿠺	𿠻	𿠼	𿠽	𿠾	𿠿
U+3F84x	𿡀	𿡁	𿡂	𿡃	𿡄	𿡅	𿡆	𿡇	𿡈	𿡉	𿡊	𿡋	𿡌	𿡍	𿡎	𿡏
U+3F85x	𿡐	𿡑	𿡒	𿡓	𿡔	𿡕	𿡖	𿡗	𿡘	𿡙	𿡚	𿡛	𿡜	𿡝	𿡞	𿡟
U+3F86x	𿡠	𿡡	𿡢	𿡣	𿡤	𿡥	𿡦	𿡧	𿡨	𿡩	𿡪	𿡫	𿡬	𿡭	𿡮	𿡯
U+3F87x	𿡰	𿡱	𿡲	𿡳	𿡴	𿡵	𿡶	𿡷	𿡸	𿡹	𿡺	𿡻	𿡼	𿡽	𿡾	𿡿
U+3F88x	𿢀	𿢁	𿢂	𿢃	𿢄	𿢅	𿢆	𿢇	𿢈	𿢉	𿢊	𿢋	𿢌	𿢍	𿢎	𿢏
U+3F89x	𿢐	𿢑	𿢒	𿢓	𿢔	𿢕	𿢖	𿢗	𿢘	𿢙	𿢚	𿢛	𿢜	𿢝	𿢞	𿢟
U+3F8Ax	𿢠	𿢡	𿢢	𿢣	𿢤	𿢥	𿢦	𿢧	𿢨	𿢩	𿢪	𿢫	𿢬	𿢭	𿢮	𿢯
U+3F8Bx	𿢰	𿢱	𿢲	𿢳	𿢴	𿢵	𿢶	𿢷	𿢸	𿢹	𿢺	𿢻	𿢼	𿢽	𿢾	𿢿
U+3F8Cx	𿣀	𿣁	𿣂	𿣃	𿣄	𿣅	𿣆	𿣇	𿣈	𿣉	𿣊	𿣋	𿣌	𿣍	𿣎	𿣏
U+3F8Dx	𿣐	𿣑	𿣒	𿣓	𿣔	𿣕	𿣖	𿣗	𿣘	𿣙	𿣚	𿣛	𿣜	𿣝	𿣞	𿣟
U+3F8Ex	𿣠	𿣡	𿣢	𿣣	𿣤	𿣥	𿣦	𿣧	𿣨	𿣩	𿣪	𿣫	𿣬	𿣭	𿣮	𿣯
U+3F8Fx	𿣰	𿣱	𿣲	𿣳	𿣴	𿣵	𿣶	𿣷	𿣸	𿣹	𿣺	𿣻	𿣼	𿣽	𿣾	𿣿
U+3F90x	𿤀	𿤁	𿤂	𿤃	𿤄	𿤅	𿤆	𿤇	𿤈	𿤉	𿤊	𿤋	𿤌	𿤍	𿤎	𿤏
U+3F91x	𿤐	𿤑	𿤒	𿤓	𿤔	𿤕	𿤖	𿤗	𿤘	𿤙	𿤚	𿤛	𿤜	𿤝	𿤞	𿤟
U+3F92x	𿤠	𿤡	𿤢	𿤣	𿤤	𿤥	𿤦	𿤧	𿤨	𿤩	𿤪	𿤫	𿤬	𿤭	𿤮	𿤯
U+3F93x	𿤰	𿤱	𿤲	𿤳	𿤴	𿤵	𿤶	𿤷	𿤸	𿤹	𿤺	𿤻	𿤼	𿤽	𿤾	𿤿
U+3F94x	𿥀	𿥁	𿥂	𿥃	𿥄	𿥅	𿥆	𿥇	𿥈	𿥉	𿥊	𿥋	𿥌	𿥍	𿥎	𿥏
U+3F95x	𿥐	𿥑	𿥒	𿥓	𿥔	𿥕	𿥖	𿥗	𿥘	𿥙	𿥚	𿥛	𿥜	𿥝	𿥞	𿥟
U+3F96x	𿥠	𿥡	𿥢	𿥣	𿥤	𿥥	𿥦	𿥧	𿥨	𿥩	𿥪	𿥫	𿥬	𿥭	𿥮	𿥯
U+3F97x	𿥰	𿥱	𿥲	𿥳	𿥴	𿥵	𿥶	𿥷	𿥸	𿥹	𿥺	𿥻	𿥼	𿥽	𿥾	𿥿
U+3F98x	𿦀	𿦁	𿦂	𿦃	𿦄	𿦅	𿦆	𿦇	𿦈	𿦉	𿦊	𿦋	𿦌	𿦍	𿦎	𿦏
U+3F99x	𿦐	𿦑	𿦒	𿦓	𿦔	𿦕	𿦖	𿦗	𿦘	𿦙	𿦚	𿦛	𿦜	𿦝	𿦞	𿦟
U+3F9Ax	𿦠	𿦡	𿦢	𿦣	𿦤	𿦥	𿦦	𿦧	𿦨	𿦩	𿦪	𿦫	𿦬	𿦭	𿦮	𿦯
U+3F9Bx	𿦰	𿦱	𿦲	𿦳	𿦴	𿦵	𿦶	𿦷	𿦸	𿦹	𿦺	𿦻	𿦼	𿦽	𿦾	𿦿
U+3F9Cx	𿧀	𿧁	𿧂	𿧃	𿧄	𿧅	𿧆	𿧇	𿧈	𿧉	𿧊	𿧋	𿧌	𿧍	𿧎	𿧏
U+3F9Dx	𿧐	𿧑	𿧒	𿧓	𿧔	𿧕	𿧖	𿧗	𿧘	𿧙	𿧚	𿧛	𿧜	𿧝	𿧞	𿧟
U+3F9Ex	𿧠	𿧡	𿧢	𿧣	𿧤	𿧥	𿧦	𿧧	𿧨	𿧩	𿧪	𿧫	𿧬	𿧭	𿧮	𿧯
U+3F9Fx	𿧰	𿧱	𿧲	𿧳	𿧴	𿧵	𿧶	𿧷	𿧸	𿧹	𿧺	𿧻	𿧼	𿧽	𿧾	𿧿
U+3FA0x	𿨀	𿨁	𿨂	𿨃	𿨄	𿨅	𿨆	𿨇	𿨈	𿨉	𿨊	𿨋	𿨌	𿨍	𿨎	𿨏
U+3FA1x	𿨐	𿨑	𿨒	𿨓	𿨔	𿨕	𿨖	𿨗	𿨘	𿨙	𿨚	𿨛	𿨜	𿨝	𿨞	𿨟
U+3FA2x	𿨠	𿨡	𿨢	𿨣	𿨤	𿨥	𿨦	𿨧	𿨨	𿨩	𿨪	𿨫	𿨬	𿨭	𿨮	𿨯
U+3FA3x	𿨰	𿨱	𿨲	𿨳	𿨴	𿨵	𿨶	𿨷	𿨸	𿨹	𿨺	𿨻	𿨼	𿨽	𿨾	𿨿
U+3FA4x	𿩀	𿩁	𿩂	𿩃	𿩄	𿩅	𿩆	𿩇	𿩈	𿩉	𿩊	𿩋	𿩌	𿩍	𿩎	𿩏
U+3FA5x	𿩐	𿩑	𿩒	𿩓	𿩔	𿩕	𿩖	𿩗	𿩘	𿩙	𿩚	𿩛	𿩜	𿩝	𿩞	𿩟
U+3FA6x	𿩠	𿩡	𿩢	𿩣	𿩤	𿩥	𿩦	𿩧	𿩨	𿩩	𿩪	𿩫	𿩬	𿩭	𿩮	𿩯
U+3FA7x	𿩰	𿩱	𿩲	𿩳	𿩴	𿩵	𿩶	𿩷	𿩸	𿩹	𿩺	𿩻	𿩼	𿩽	𿩾	𿩿
U+3FA8x	𿪀	𿪁	𿪂	𿪃	𿪄	𿪅	𿪆	𿪇	𿪈	𿪉	𿪊	𿪋	𿪌	𿪍	𿪎	𿪏
U+3FA9x	𿪐	𿪑	𿪒	𿪓	𿪔	𿪕	𿪖	𿪗	𿪘	𿪙	𿪚	𿪛	𿪜	𿪝	𿪞	𿪟
U+3FAAx	𿪠	𿪡	𿪢	𿪣	𿪤	𿪥	𿪦	𿪧	𿪨	𿪩	𿪪	𿪫	𿪬	𿪭	𿪮	𿪯
U+3FABx	𿪰	𿪱	𿪲	𿪳	𿪴	𿪵	𿪶	𿪷	𿪸	𿪹	𿪺	𿪻	𿪼	𿪽	𿪾	𿪿
U+3FACx	𿫀	𿫁	𿫂	𿫃	𿫄	𿫅	𿫆	𿫇	𿫈	𿫉	𿫊	𿫋	𿫌	𿫍	𿫎	𿫏
U+3FADx	𿫐	𿫑	𿫒	𿫓	𿫔	𿫕	𿫖	𿫗	𿫘	𿫙	𿫚	𿫛	𿫜	𿫝	𿫞	𿫟
U+3FAEx	𿫠	𿫡	𿫢	𿫣	𿫤	𿫥	𿫦	𿫧	𿫨	𿫩	𿫪	𿫫	𿫬	𿫭	𿫮	𿫯
U+3FAFx	𿫰	𿫱	𿫲	𿫳	𿫴	𿫵	𿫶	𿫷	𿫸	𿫹	𿫺	𿫻	𿫼	𿫽	𿫾	𿫿
U+3FB0x	𿬀	𿬁	𿬂	𿬃	𿬄	𿬅	𿬆	𿬇	𿬈	𿬉	𿬊	𿬋	𿬌	𿬍	𿬎	𿬏
U+3FB1x	𿬐	𿬑	𿬒	𿬓	𿬔	𿬕	𿬖	𿬗	𿬘	𿬙	𿬚	𿬛	𿬜	𿬝	𿬞	𿬟
U+3FB2x	𿬠	𿬡	𿬢	𿬣	𿬤	𿬥	𿬦	𿬧	𿬨	𿬩	𿬪	𿬫	𿬬	𿬭	𿬮	𿬯
U+3FB3x	𿬰	𿬱	𿬲	𿬳	𿬴	𿬵	𿬶	𿬷	𿬸	𿬹	𿬺	𿬻	𿬼	𿬽	𿬾	𿬿
U+3FB4x	𿭀	𿭁	𿭂	𿭃	𿭄	𿭅	𿭆	𿭇	𿭈	𿭉	𿭊	𿭋	𿭌	𿭍	𿭎	𿭏
U+3FB5x	𿭐	𿭑	𿭒	𿭓	𿭔	𿭕	𿭖	𿭗	𿭘	𿭙	𿭚	𿭛	𿭜	𿭝	𿭞	𿭟
U+3FB6x	𿭠	𿭡	𿭢	𿭣	𿭤	𿭥	𿭦	𿭧	𿭨	𿭩	𿭪	𿭫	𿭬	𿭭	𿭮	𿭯
U+3FB7x	𿭰	𿭱	𿭲	𿭳	𿭴	𿭵	𿭶	𿭷	𿭸	𿭹	𿭺	𿭻	𿭼	𿭽	𿭾	𿭿
U+3FB8x	𿮀	𿮁	𿮂	𿮃	𿮄	𿮅	𿮆	𿮇	𿮈	𿮉	𿮊	𿮋	𿮌	𿮍	𿮎	𿮏
U+3FB9x	𿮐	𿮑	𿮒	𿮓	𿮔	𿮕	𿮖	𿮗	𿮘	𿮙	𿮚	𿮛	𿮜	𿮝	𿮞	𿮟
U+3FBAx	𿮠	𿮡	𿮢	𿮣	𿮤	𿮥	𿮦	𿮧	𿮨	𿮩	𿮪	𿮫	𿮬	𿮭	𿮮	𿮯
U+3FBBx	𿮰	𿮱	𿮲	𿮳	𿮴	𿮵	𿮶	𿮷	𿮸	𿮹	𿮺	𿮻	𿮼	𿮽	𿮾	𿮿
U+3FBCx	𿯀	𿯁	𿯂	𿯃	𿯄	𿯅	𿯆	𿯇	𿯈	𿯉	𿯊	𿯋	𿯌	𿯍	𿯎	𿯏
U+3FBDx	𿯐	𿯑	𿯒	𿯓	𿯔	𿯕	𿯖	𿯗	𿯘	𿯙	𿯚	𿯛	𿯜	𿯝	𿯞	𿯟
U+3FBEx	𿯠	𿯡	𿯢	𿯣	𿯤	𿯥	𿯦	𿯧	𿯨	𿯩	𿯪	𿯫	𿯬	𿯭	𿯮	𿯯
U+3FBFx	𿯰	𿯱	𿯲	𿯳	𿯴	𿯵	𿯶	𿯷	𿯸	𿯹	𿯺	𿯻	𿯼	𿯽	𿯾	𿯿
U+3FC0x	𿰀	𿰁	𿰂	𿰃	𿰄	𿰅	𿰆	𿰇	𿰈	𿰉	𿰊	𿰋	𿰌	𿰍	𿰎	𿰏
U+3FC1x	𿰐	𿰑	𿰒	𿰓	𿰔	𿰕	𿰖	𿰗	𿰘	𿰙	𿰚	𿰛	𿰜	𿰝	𿰞	𿰟
U+3FC2x	𿰠	𿰡	𿰢	𿰣	𿰤	𿰥	𿰦	𿰧	𿰨	𿰩	𿰪	𿰫	𿰬	𿰭	𿰮	𿰯
U+3FC3x	𿰰	𿰱	𿰲	𿰳	𿰴	𿰵	𿰶	𿰷	𿰸	𿰹	𿰺	𿰻	𿰼	𿰽	𿰾	𿰿
Notes 1.As of Unicode version 18.0

== History ==
The following Unicode-related committee and working group documents record the process by which the character repertoire of the Small Seal block was selected and arranged:

Version	Final code points (Note: Proposed code points and characters names may differ from final code points and names)	Count	UTC or L2 ID	WG2 ID	IRG ID	Document
18.0	U+3D000..3FC3F	11,328	L2/03-450		N0999	China’s Old Hanzi Encoding Proposal, 2003-11-16
18.0	U+3D000..3FC3F	11,328	L2/03-452	N2684	N1014	Li, Guoying; Bishop, Tom (2003-11-19), Draft Agreement on Old Hanzi Encoding
18.0	U+3D000..3FC3F	11,328	L2/04-204	N2782R	N1055	Resolution from the Old Hanzi Interest Group, 2004-05-26
18.0	U+3D000..3FC3F	11,328			N1087	A Statement on old Hanzi Encoding Principles, 2004-11-29
18.0	U+3D000..3FC3F	11,328			N1102	Resolutions from the Old Hanzi Expert Group, 2004-12-01
18.0	U+3D000..3FC3F	11,328			N1119	"Encoding Sample for Xiaozhuan", Old Hanzi Samples from China, 2005-05-18, pp. 12–15
18.0	U+3D000..3FC3F	11,328			N1123	Problems regarding Old Hanzi, 2005-05-19
18.0	U+3D000..3FC3F	11,328			N1134	"References on Small Seal", References on Old Hanzi, 2005-05-25, pp. 1–2
18.0	U+3D000..3FC3F	11,328			N1135	"3.3 Contributions on the other type of Old Hanzi", Report from the Old Hanzi Expert Group, 2005-05-25, p. 6
18.0	U+3D000..3FC3F	11,328			N1135R	"3.3 Contributions on the other type of Old Hanzi", Report from the Old Hanzi Expert Group, 2005-05-25, pp. 5–6
18.0	U+3D000..3FC3F	11,328			N1706	Consolidated P&P of Old Hanzi, 2010-09-30
18.0	U+3D000..3FC3F	11,328			N1742	Proposal of new ad-hoc group for preliminary study of Old Hanzi encoding architecture, 2010-11-10
18.0	U+3D000..3FC3F	11,328			N1746	"2.1. The background of IRG N1706 and P&P", Report from the Old Hanzi Expert Group, 2010-11-11, p. 1
18.0	U+3D000..3FC3F	11,328		N4095		Japanese Comments on TCA submission N4048, 2011-06-13
18.0	U+3D000..3FC3F	11,328			N1814	"2.1. Change of Modern Character Column", Old Hanzi Expert Group Meeting #2 Report, 2011-11-08, p. 2–3
18.0	U+3D000..3FC3F	11,328			N1842	"C) The consideration of the coverage of encoded UCS characters that can be used in the column "Corresponding Modern Character (UCS)."", Japanese proposal to the agenda for Old Hanzi Tokyo meeting, 2012-02-10, p. 3
18.0	U+3D000..3FC3F	11,328		N4233		Proposal of Separating the Old Hanzi Group from IRG, 2012-02-11
18.0	U+3D000..3FC3F	11,328			N1836	"IRG N1827 1.c (coverage of the code points for "UCS character" column)", Old Hanzi Expert Group Meeting #3 Report, 2012-02-23, pp. 2–3
18.0	U+3D000..3FC3F	11,328	L2/14-242	N4634		Proposal to encode Small Seal Script in UCS [small sample], 2014-09-30
18.0	U+3D000..3FC3F	11,328	L2/15-281	N4688		Proposal to encode Small Seal Script in UCS [full proposal - 89MB], 2015-10-20
18.0	U+3D000..3FC3F	11,328	L2/16-092	N4716		Suzuki, Toshiya (2016-04-28), Proposal to Apply source-Based Variation Selector in Shuowen Small Seal Encoding
18.0	U+3D000..3FC3F	11,328		N4755		Feedback on N4716 Shuowen small seal, 2016-09-22
18.0	U+3D000..3FC3F	11,328		N4761		Suzuki, Toshiya (2016-09-26), Feedback on N4755 Shuowen small seal
18.0	U+3D000..3FC3F	11,328	L2/17-250	N4834		Suzuki, Toshiya; Cook, Richard (2017-06-18), Shuowen Seal Encoding Design Issues
18.0	U+3D000..3FC3F	11,328	L2/17-317	N4852		Cook, Richard (2017-08-24), Shuowen Seal Encoding Design Issues++
18.0	U+3D000..3FC3F	11,328		N4844		Wei, Selena; Chan, Eiso (2017-08-24), Comments on encoding Shuowen Small Seal
18.0	U+3D000..3FC3F	11,328		N4843		Response to N4834: Shuowen Seal Encoding Design Issues, 2017-08-26
18.0	U+3D000..3FC3F	11,328	L2/17-318	N4853		Cook, Richard; Suzuki, Toshiya; Wang, Xiaoming; Wei, Selena (2017-09-01), Shuowen Seal Ad Hoc Meeting Resolutions
18.0	U+3D000..3FC3F	11,328		N4855		Comments on Encoding of Small Seal Script Characters, 2017-09-08
18.0	U+3D000..3FC3F	11,328	L2/17-371	N4909		Cook, Richard; McGowan, Rick; Whistler, Ken (2017-10-05), Seal Script Naming Considerations
18.0	U+3D000..3FC3F	11,328		N4973		Comments on encoding Shuowen Small Seal, 2018-06-12
18.0	U+3D000..3FC3F	11,328		N4992		Suzuki, Toshiya (2018-06-17), Comments on WG2 N4973 (Small Seal)
18.0	U+3D000..3FC3F	11,328		N4996		Wei, Selena (2018-06-20), Response to WG2 N4992 (Small Seal)
18.0	U+3D000..3FC3F	11,328		N5034		Suzuki, Toshiya (2018-12-17), Report of Discussion on Small Seal Script during WG2 #67
18.0	U+3D000..3FC3F	11,328		N5089		Wei, Selena; Wang, Ning; Wang, Liun; Hsu, Hsueh-Jen; Suzuki, Toshiya; Chen, Zhuang; Wang, Xiaoming; Hu, Jiajia (2019-06-01), Shuowen Seal Informal Meeting Report (June 1st 2019, Beijing)
18.0	U+3D000..3FC3F	11,328	L2/19-228 (appendix)	N5105 (appendix)		Proposal to encode Small Seal Script, 2019-06-19
18.0	U+3D000..3FC3F	11,328	L2/19-245	N5108		Suzuki, Toshiya (2019-06-19), Report of Seal Script discussion at WG2 #68
18.0	U+3D000..3FC3F	11,328		N5117		Shuowen Seal Encoding Report, 2019-09-27
18.0	U+3D000..3FC3F	11,328		N5118		Wei, Selena; Tseng, Yenling (2019-09-27), About the future extension of Shuowen Seal
18.0	U+3D000..3FC3F	11,328		N5119		Shuowen Seal Ad Hoc Meeting Report, Taipei, Oct 2019, 2019-10-01
18.0	U+3D000..3FC3F	11,328		N5123		Suzuki, Toshiya (2019-12-01), Comments on several criteria to distinguish Shuowen Seal Glyphs (Feedback to WG2 N5118)
18.0	U+3D000..3FC3F	11,328		N5133 (appendix)		Suzuki, Toshiya (2020-04-01), Comparison table of N5105 proposal (of Shuowen Seal) and Changzhi's version
18.0	U+3D000..3FC3F	11,328	L2/22-140	N5188		About the future extension of other versions of Shuowen Seal, 2022-06-17
18.0	U+3D000..3FC3F	11,328	L2/22-141	N5189		Wei, Selena (2022-06-17), THX Seal glyph Correction Principles
18.0	U+3D000..3FC3F	11,328	L2/22-139	N5187		TCA and China Feedback on N5133, 2022-06-20
18.0	U+3D000..3FC3F	11,328	L2/22-142	N5190		THX correction glyph summary table, 2022-06-20
18.0	U+3D000..3FC3F	11,328	L2/22-143	N5191		THX Property Table, 2022-06-20
18.0	U+3D000..3FC3F	11,328	L2/22-128			Anderson, Deborah; Whistler, Ken; Pournader, Roozbeh; Constable, Peter (2022-07-20), "15. Seal", Recommendations to UTC #172 July 2022 on Script Proposals, p. 19
18.0	U+3D000..3FC3F	11,328	L2/22-279			Cook, Richard (2022-11-08), UCS Seal Script Source Mapping Data
18.0	U+3D000..3FC3F	11,328		N5209 (appendix)		Suignard, Michel (2023-03-11), Considerations concerning the Small Seal encoding initiative
18.0	U+3D000..3FC3F	11,328		N5211 (appendix)		Suzuki, Toshiya; Cook, Richard (2023-04-03), 14-Column Seal Script Glyph comparison chart 2017-12-06
18.0	U+3D000..3FC3F	11,328		N5219		Suzuki, Toshiya (2023-06-03), Small seal, comments to latest documents from TCA/China (n5187, 5189, 5190)
18.0	U+3D000..3FC3F	11,328		N5230 (appendix)		TCA feedback to n5209 (Considerations about Small Seal encoding initiative, Suignard), 2023-06-16
18.0	U+3D000..3FC3F	11,328		N5231		TCA feedback to n5219 (comments from Suzuki), 2023-06-16
18.0	U+3D000..3FC3F	11,328		N5232 (appendix)		Suzuki, Toshiya (2023-06-16), Preliminary Draft of Mapping Table for Shuowen Seal: from CCZ to N5191
18.0	U+3D000..3FC3F	11,328	L2/23-166	N5242 (appendix)		Suzuki, Toshiya (2023-07-08), Small-Seal, Glyph Image Chart to Review L2/22-279 Mapping
18.0	U+3D000..3FC3F	11,328		N5272		Response to WG2 N5232 (Preliminary Draft of Mapping Table for Shuowen Seal), 2024-06-06
18.0	U+3D000..3FC3F	11,328		N5273		Response to WG2 N5209 (Considerations concerning the Small Seal encoding), 2024-06-06
18.0	U+3D000..3FC3F	11,328		N5293		Small Seal Font for 49 entries from K and D version, 2024-12-06
18.0	U+3D000..3FC3F	11,328		N5326		Suzuki, Toshiya (2024-12-25), Comment on DYC Glyphs in TTF by TCA & China
18.0	U+3D000..3FC3F	11,328		N5294 (appendix) (appendix) (appendix) (appendix)		Suignard, Michel (2025-01-18), Considerations concerning the Small Seal encoding initiative
18.0	U+3D000..3FC3F	11,328		N5294R		Suignard, Michel (2025-01-19), Considerations concerning the Small Seal encoding initiative
18.0	U+3D000..3FC3F	11,328	L2/25-049	N5294R2 (appendix)		Suignard, Michel (2025-01-22), Considerations concerning the Small Seal encoding initiative
18.0	U+3D000..3FC3F	11,328	L2/25-049R	N5294R3		Suignard, Michel (2025-01-26), Considerations concerning the Small Seal encoding initiative
18.0	U+3D000..3FC3F	11,328	L2/25-111	N5306		Suignard, Michel (2025-03-31), Converging towards a Small Seal encoding proposal
18.0	U+3D000..3FC3F	11,328		N5307		Mapping Principles of Small Seal Glyphs in Different Shuowen Versions, 2025-05-07
18.0	U+3D000..3FC3F	11,328		N5312		Feedback to N5294R2 & N5294R3 (Small Seal), 2025-05-07
18.0	U+3D000..3FC3F	11,328		N5313		Feedback to N5306, 2025-05-07
18.0	U+3D000..3FC3F	11,328		N5318		Proposal to encode Four-Column Small Seal Script in UCS, 2025-06-06
18.0	U+3D000..3FC3F	11,328		N5317		Suignard, Michel (2025-06-09), Disposition of comments on N5294R2/R3 and N5306 (Small Seal)
18.0	U+3D000..3FC3F	11,328		N5307R		Mapping Principles of Small Seal Glyphs in Different Shuowen Versions, Revised, 2025-06-12
18.0	U+3D000..3FC3F	11,328		N5313R (appendix)		Revised feedback to N5306 (Small Seal), 2025-06-12
18.0	U+3D000..3FC3F	11,328		N5318R		Revised proposal to encode Four-Column Small Seal Script (Preamble), revised, 2025-06-12
18.0	U+3D000..3FC3F	11,328		N5317R		Suignard, Michel (2025-06-15), Revised disposition of comments on N5306 (Small Seal)
18.0	U+3D000..3FC3F	11,328		N5317R2		Suignard, Michel (2025-06-19), Revised disposition of comments on N5306 (Small Seal)
18.0	U+3D000..3FC3F	11,328		N5342		Feedback to "Comment on DYC Glyphs in TTF by TCA & China" (N5326), 2025-06-20
18.0	U+3D000..3FC3F	11,328		N5327		Suzuki, Toshiya (2025-06-21), Comment on N5313R (Small Seal)
18.0	U+3D000..3FC3F	11,328		N5337		Feedback to N5327 (Small Seal), 2025-06-23
18.0	U+3D000..3FC3F	11,328		N5341		Suignard, Michel (2025-06-26), Small Seal Codecharts and Data Set
18.0	U+3D000..3FC3F	11,328		N5317R3		Suignard, Michel (2025-06-30), Revised disposition of comments on N5306 (Small Seal)
18.0	U+3D000..3FC3F	11,328		N5343		Suignard, Michel (2025-09-28), Additional Feedback on Small Seal
18.0	U+3D000..3FC3F	11,328	L2/25-232			"1.2: Seal Script", Recommendations to UTC #185 (October 2025) on Script Proposals, 2025-10-24, pp. 2–3
18.0	U+3D000..3FC3F	11,328	L2/25-232R			"1.2: Seal Script", Recommendations to UTC #185 (October 2025) on Script Proposals, 2025-10-27, pp. 2–3
18.0	U+3D000..3FC3F	11,328	L2/25-226			"D.1 Section 1.2 Seal Script", Draft Minutes of UTC Meeting 185, 2025-11-26
18.0	U+3D000..3FC3F	11,328		N5344		Suignard, Michel (2026-10-01), Proposal to encode the Small Seal Script in UCS
18.0	U+3D000..3FC3F	11,328		N5346 (appendix)		Feedback to Small Seal Code charts N5341, 2025-10-03
18.0	U+3D000..3FC3F	11,328		N5344R		Suignard, Michel (2026-10-07), Proposal to encode the Small Seal Script in UCS, revised
18.0	U+3D000..3FC3F	11,328		N5344R2		Suignard, Michel (2026-01-08), Proposal to encode the Small Seal Script in UCS, 2nd revision
18.0	U+3D000..3FC3F	11,328		N5355		Hu, Jiajia; Wei, Selena (2026-01-15), Clarification about Seal normalized form (modern CJK), feedback to N5348
18.0	U+3D000..3FC3F	11,328		N5348		Suignard, Michel (2026-03-13), Summary of discussions concerning Small Seal Script
18.0	U+3D000..3FC3F	11,328		N5348R		Suignard, Michel (2026-03-16), Summary of discussions concerning Small Seal Script, revised
18.0	U+3D000..3FC3F	11,328	L2/26-108			Suignard, Michel (2026-04-03), Draft Unicode Standard Annex #60: Data for Non Han Ideographic Scripts
