= Bengali–Assamese script =

Type of South Asian writing system

Bengali–Assamese বাংলা-অসমীয়া
- Image 1: The text, from the 18th-century Hastividyārnava, commissioned by Ahom king Siva Singha, reads: sri sri mot xivo xingho moharaja. The modern Bengali glyph "র" currently used for ra is used in this pre-modern Assamese/Sanskrit manuscript for va, the modern form of which is "ৱ". Though the modern Assamese alphabet does not use this glyph for any letter, modern Tirhuta continues to use this for va. Image 2: The native names, in Bengali–Assamese, of the three scheduled languages of India that commonly use this script, followed by their standard English names and a Latin transliteration of the native name in parentheses.
- Script type: Abugida
- Period: c. 1100–present
- Direction: Left-to-right
- Official script: for Bengali language, Assamese language and Meitei language (constitutionally termed Manipuri)
- Languages: Bengali, Assamese, Bishnupriya, Meitei, Sylheti, Santali, Kokborok, Garo, Hajong, Chakma, Mizo, Khasi, Chittagonian, Kudmali, Ho, Kamtapuri, Noakhali, and others.

Related scripts
- Parent systems: Egyptian Hieroglyphics: Proto-Sinaitic script; Phoenician alphabet; Aramaic alphabet (disputed) (Note: The Semitic/Aramaic origin model remains disputed among epigraphists.); Brāhmī; Gupta; Siddhaṃ; Gaudi; Bengali–Assamese
- Child systems: Bengali, Assamese

ISO 15924
- ISO 15924: Beng (325), Bengali (Bangla)

Unicode
- Unicode alias: Bengali
- Unicode range: U+0980–U+09FF (Bengali), U+11DF0–U+11DFF (Bengali Supplement), U+011480–U+0114DF (Tirhuta)

The Bengali–Assamese script, sometimes also known as Eastern Nagri, is an eastern Brahmic script primarily used today for the Bengali and Assamese languages spoken in eastern South Asia. It evolved from Gaudi script, also the common ancestor of the Odia and Tirhuta scripts. It is commonly called the Bengali script by Bengalis and the Assamese script by the Assamese, while in academic discourse it is called Eastern-Nāgarī. The script was traditionally called Gauḍa (not to be confused with Gaudi script, its precursor) as seen in the catalogue of books at the Radha-Damodara Mandir maintained by Jiva Goswami during the time of Akbar. Bengali is the official and national language of Bangladesh and three of the 22 official languages of the Indian Republic—Bengali, Assamese, and Meitei (Note: Besides Bengali script, Meitei language also uses Meitei script as its official script simultaneously.)—commonly use this script in writing;

Besides Bengali and Assamese, it is also used to write Bishnupriya Manipuri, Meitei, Chakma, Santali, and other languages spoken in eastern South Asia. Historically, it was used to write various Old and Middle Indo-Aryan languages, and, like many other Brahmic scripts, is still used for Sanskrit. Other languages, such as Bodo, Karbi, and Mising, were once written in this script. The two major alphabets in this script, Assamese and Bengali, are virtually identical, except for two characters: Assamese differs from Bengali in one letter for the /r/ sound, and an extra letter for the /w/ or /v/ sound.

== History ==
Places where the Eastern Nagari script (Purva Nagari) is used

The Bengali–Assamese script was not originally associated with any particular language, but was prevalent as the main script in the eastern regions of Medieval India for Old- and Middle-Indo-Aryan, including Sanskrit. All these eastern Magadhan scripts are based on a system of characters historically related to, but distinct from, Devanagari. Brahmi, an ancient Indian syllabary, is the source of most native Indian scripts, including the South Indian languages and Devanagari, the script associated with classical Sanskrit and other Indo-Aryan languages.

The Kutila inscription of Bareilly is an inscription in the Kutila script from 992 CE that provides crucial evidence in tracing the shared descent of the Devanagari and Bengali-Assamese scripts of Northern and Eastern India from the predecessor Gupta script. The writing was found on a stone unearthed in Bareilly district in the United Provinces of Agra and Oudh. The inscription says it was created by an engraver from Kannauj who was "proficient in the Kutila character". It also includes the date of the inscription, Vikram Samvat 1049, which corresponds to 992 CE.

The modern eastern scripts (Bengali-Assamese, Odia, and Maithili) became clearly differentiated around the 14th and 15th centuries from their predecessor Gaudi. While the scripts in Bengal, Assam, and Mithila remained similar to each other, the Odia script developed a curved top in the 13th–14th centuries and became increasingly different. Old Maithili also used Tirhuta, a script similar to Bengali–Assamese script, and Maithili scholars (particularly of the older generation) still write Sanskrit in it.

According to d'Hubert (2014) manuscripts written in the 17th–18th centuries from eastern Bihar in the west to Manipur in the east followed related scripts that can be classed largely into three on the basis of the letter ro: (1) western, with the current Bengali ro; (2) northern, with the current Assamese ro; and (3) eastern, largely lost today with a ro not seen today.

Modern Bengali–Assamese script saw further standardisations after printing was introduced.

=== Printing ===
Though there were early attempts to cut Bengali types it was the East India Company's interest in propagating the Bengali language that ultimately prevailed. It first commissioned William Bolts, a Dutch adventurer, to create a grammar for Bengali, but he had to leave India after he ran into trouble with the company. The first significant book with Bengali typography was Halhed's 1778 "A Grammar of the Bengal Language" which he compiled from a meagre set of six Bengali manuscripts. When Halhed turned to Warren Hastings for publishing, he was referred to Charles Wilkins, the type-founder at the Company press at Hoogly. Learned in Sanskrit and Persian, Wilkins singlehandedly cut the most complete set. He was assisted by the Bengali blacksmith, Panchanan Karmakar, who is often erroneously credited as the father of the Bengali type.

== Script ==
Evolution of Bengali-Assamese script

Inscription from Valavarman III from 9th-10th century, Nagaon, Assam. Modern forms of letters and matras are already discernible.

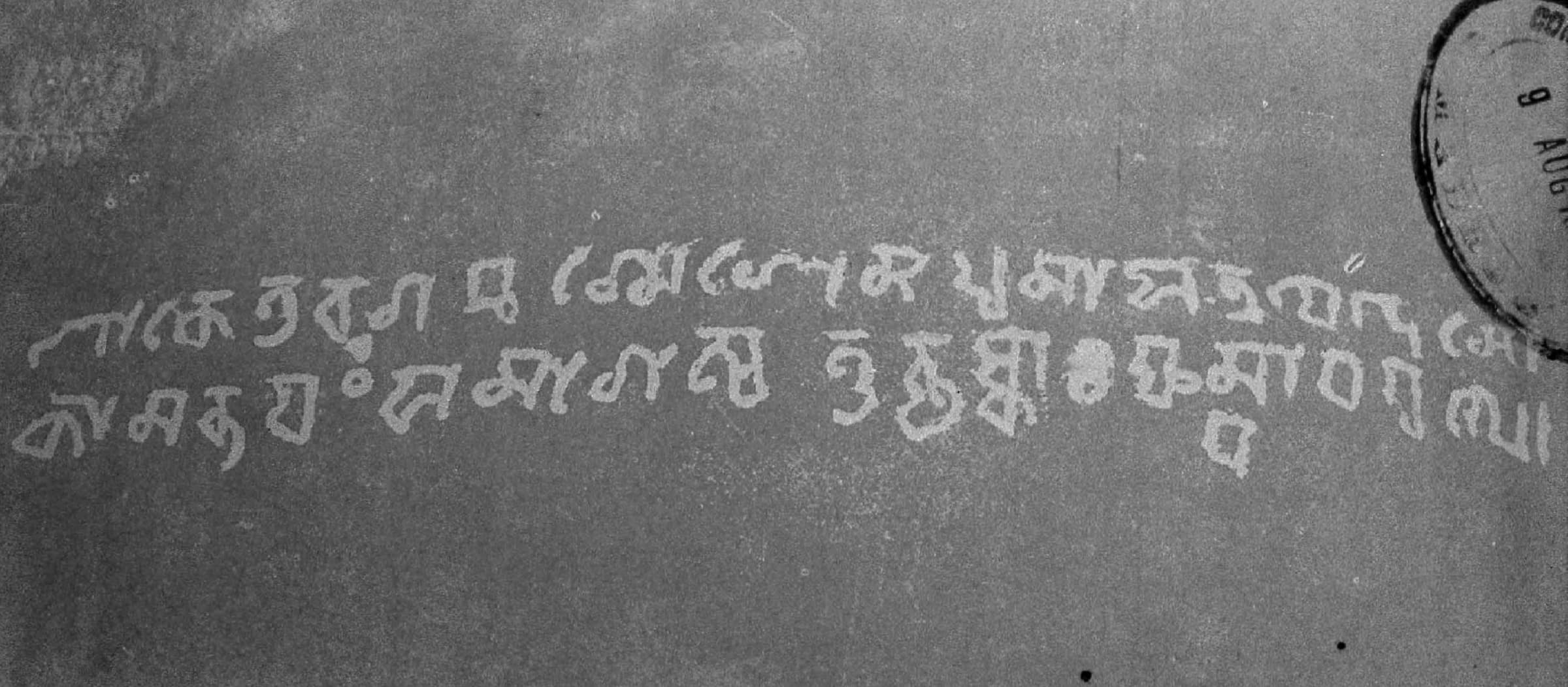
Early 13th century rock inscription near Guwahati, Assam

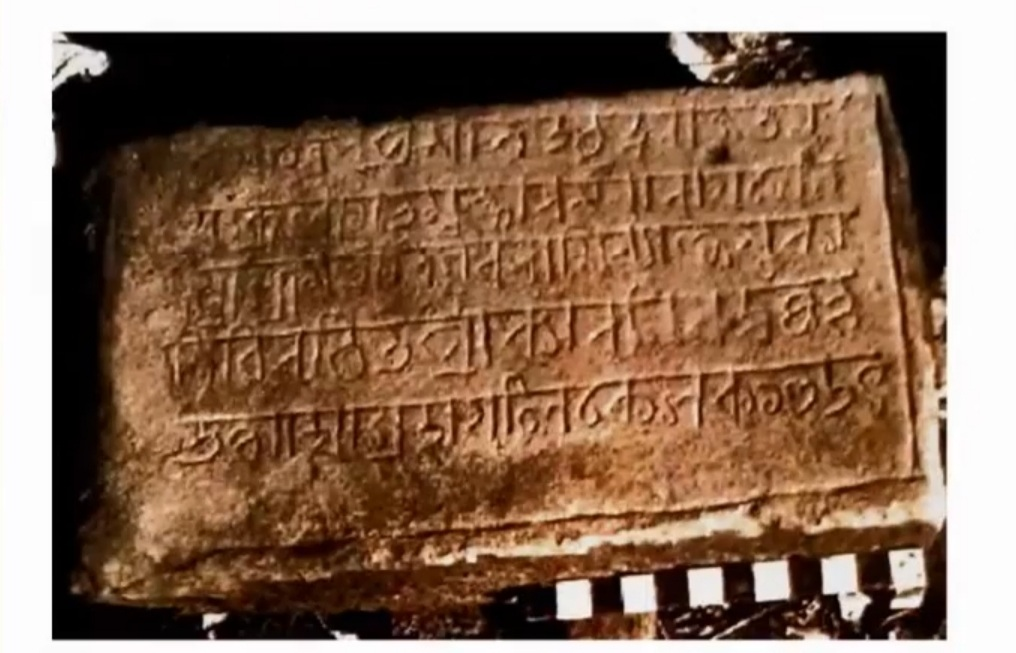
Mid 15th century rock Chutia inscription found at Sadiya, Assam

The text, from the 18th-century Hastividyārnava, commissioned by Ahom king Siva Singha, reads: sri sri mot xivo xingha moharaja. The modern Bengali glyph "র" currently used for ra is used in this pre-modern Assamese/Sanskrit manuscript for va, the modern form of which is "ৱ". Though the modern Assamese alphabet does not use this glyph for any letter, modern Tirhuta continues to use this for va.

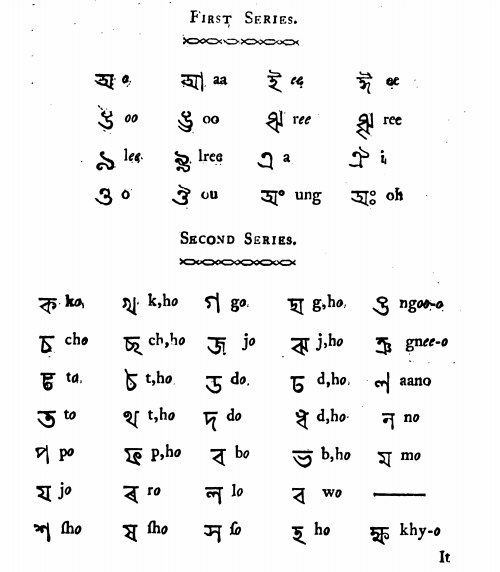
Halhed's script, 1778, as designed by Charles Wilkins, was the first significant type for printing. As can be clearly seen, not all the glyphs have achieved their modern forms yet. Though the chart sports the Assamese ৰ, the Bengali র was used interchangeably in the text.

In this and other articles on Wikipedia dealing with the Assamese and Bengali languages, a Romanization scheme used by linguists specialising in Bengali phonology and a separate Assamese transliteration table used by linguists specialising in Assamese phonology are included along with IPA transcription.

=== Alphabets ===
There are three major modern alphabets in this script: Bengali, Assamese, and Tirhuta. Modern Assamese is very similar to modern Bengali. Assamese has at least one extra letter, ৱ, that Bengali does not. It also uses a separate letter for the sound 'ro' ৰ different from the letter used for that sound in Bengali র and the letter ক্ষ is not a conjunct as in Bengali, but a letter by itself. The alphabetical orders of the two alphabets also differ, in the position of the letter ক্ষ, for example. Languages like Meitei and Bishnupriya use a hybrid of the two alphabets, with the Bengali র and the Assamese ৱ. Tirhuta is more different and carries forward some forms used in medieval Assamese.

=== Vowels and diacritics ===
The script consists of two sets of letters, the Swarabarna,of a total of 11 vowel letters, used to represent the seven vowel sounds of Bengali and eight vowel sounds of Assamese, along with a number of vowel diphthongs creating the second set of 39 (in Bengali) and 41 letters (in Assamese) called Byanjanbarna. All of these vowel letters are used in both Assamese and Bengali. Some of the vowel letters have different sounds depending on the word, and a number of vowel distinctions preserved in the writing system are not pronounced as such in modern spoken Bengali or Assamese. For example, the script has two symbols for the vowel sound [i] and two symbols for the vowel sound [u]. This redundancy stems from the time when this script was used to write Sanskrit, a language that had a short [i] and a long [iː], and a short [u] and a long [uː]. These letters are preserved in the script with their traditional names of "short i" and "long i", etc., despite the fact that they are no longer pronounced differently in ordinary speech.

=== Some language-specific usages ===
In the Bengali alphabet, অ্যা is used to write /æ/ in foreign loan words. Some other languages use a vowel অৗ to denote /ɯ/ which is not found in either Bengali or Assamese; and though the vowel diacritic (matra, ৗ) is found in Tirhuta the vowel letter itself is absent. Assamese alphabet uses an additional "matra" (ʼ) that is used to represent the phonemes অʼ and এʼ.

Vowel Table
Vowels	Vowel Diacritic symbol	Assamese	Bengali	Meitei (Manipuri)	Sylheti	Hajong	Rabha	Rajbongsi
অ	–	ô	ô/o	ô/a	o	o	ô	ô
অʼ	ʼ	o	–	–	–	–	–	–
আ	া	a	a	a꞉	a	a	a	a
অ্যা/এ্যা	্যা	–	æ	–	–	–	–	–
অৗ	ৗ	–	–	–	–	â	â	–
ই	ি	i	i	i	i	i	i	i
ইʼ	িʼ	–	–	–	–	–	î	–
ঈ	ী	i	i	–	ī	–	–	(i)
উ	ু	u	u	u	u	u	u	u
উʼ	ুʼ	–	–	–	–	–	â	–
ঊ	ূ	u	u	–	ū	–	–	(u)
ঋ	ৃ	ri	ri	–	ri	–	–	ri
ৠ	ৄ	rii	rii	–	–	–	–	–
ঌ	ৢ	li	li	–	–	–	–	–
ৡ	ৣ	lii	lii	–	–	–	–	–
এ	ে	ê	e/ê	e	ê	e	e	ê
এʼ	েʼ	e	–	–	–	–	–	–
ঐ	ৈ	ôi	ôi	ei	oi	oi	–	ôi
ও	ো	û	o	o/ô	–	ô	o	o
ঔ	ৌ	ôu	ôu	ou	ou	ôu	–	ôu

Vowel signs can be used in conjunction with consonants to modify the pronunciation of the consonant (here exemplified by ক, kô). When no vowel Diacritic symbol is written, then the vowel "অ" (ô) is the default inherited vowel for the consonant. To specifically denote the absence of a vowel, a hôsôntô (্) may be written underneath the consonant.

=== Consonants ===
The names of the consonant letters in Eastern Nagari are typically just the consonant's main pronunciation plus the inherent vowel "অ" ô. Since the inherent vowel is assumed and not written, most letters' names look identical to the letter itself (e.g. the name of the letter "ঘ" is itself ঘ ghô, not gh). Some letters that have lost their distinctive pronunciation in Modern Assamese and Bengali are called by a more elaborate name. For example, since the consonant phoneme /n/ can be written ন, ণ, or ঞ (depending on the spelling of the particular word), these letters are not simply called nô; instead, they are called "dental nô", "cerebral nô" and niô. Similarly, the phoneme /ʃ/ in Bengali and /x/ in Assamese can be written as "palatal shô/xhô" শ, "cerebral shô/xhô" ষ, or "dental sô/xô" স, depending on the word.

Consonant Table
Consonant	Assamese	Bengali	Meitei (Manipuri)	Chittagonian	Sylheti	Hajong	Maithili
ক	kô	kô	kô	xô	xô	ko	ka
খ	khô	khô	khô	xô	xo	kho	kha
গ	gô	gô	gô	gô	go	go	ga
ঘ	ghô	ghô	ghô	gô	go	gho	gha
ঙ	umô	umô	ngô	ngô	–	ngo	nga
চ	sô	cô	cô	sô	so	co	ca
ছ	sô	chô	–	sô	so	so	-
𑒕	–	–	–	–	–	–	cha
জ	zô	jô	jô	zô	zo	jo	ja
ঝ	zhô	jhô	jhô	zô	zo	jho	-
𑒗	–	–	–	–	–	–	jha
ঞ	niô	nô	–	–	–	–	nia
ট	tô	ţô	–	tô	to	–	–
𑒙	–	–	–	–	–	–	ţa
ঠ	thô	ţhô	–	tô	to	–	ţha
ড	dô	đô	–	dô	do	–	da
ড়	rô	ŗô	–	rô	ŗo	–	–
ঢ	dhô	đhô	–	dô	do	-	da
ঢ়	rhô	ŗhô	–	rô	ro	–	–
ণ	nô	nô	–	nô	no	-	-
ত	tô	tô	tô	tô	ṭo	to	ta
থ	thô	thô	thô	tô	ṭo	tho	tha
দ	dô	dô	dô	dô	ḍo	do	da
ধ	dhô	dhô	dhô	dhô	ḍo	dho	dha
ন	nô	nô	nô	nô	no	no	na
প	pô	pô	pô	fô	fo	po	pa
ফ	phô	phô/fô	fô	fô	fo	fo	–
𑒤	–	–	–	–	–	–	pha
ব	bô	bô	bô	vô	vo	bo	ra
ভ	bhô	bhô	vô	vô	vo	vo	bha
ম	mô	mô	mô	mô	mo	mo	ma
য	zô	jô	–	zô	zo	-	ya
য়	yô	yô	yô	yô	–	yo	–
র	(wô)	rô	rô	rô	ro	wõ	va
ৰ	rô	(rô)	ro	–	rô	–	ra
ল	lô	lô	lô	lô	lo	–	–
𑒪	–	–	–	–	–	–	la
ৱ	wô	–	wo	wô	–	–	–
শ	xô	şô	–	shô	–	-	sha
ষ	xô	şşô	–	shô	–	-	ssha
স	xô	şô	sô	shô	şo	-	sa
হ	hô	hô	hô	ô	ho	ho	-
𑒯	–	–	–	–	–	–	ha

=== Digits ===
Digits
Arabic numerals	0	1	2	3	4	5	6	7	8	9
Bengali-Assamese numerals	০	১	২	৩	৪	৫	৬	৭	৮	৯
Assamese names	xuinnô	ek	dui	tini	sari	pãs	sôy	xat	ath	nô
Assamese names	শূন্য	এক	দুই	তিনি	চাৰি	পাঁচ	ছয়	সাত	আঠ	ন
Bengali names	shunnô	æk	dui	tin	char	pãch	chhôy	shat	aţ	nôy
Bengali names	শূন্য	এক	দুই	তিন	চার	পাঁচ	ছয়	সাত	আট	নয়
Meitei names	phoon	ama	ani	ahum	mari	manga	taruk	taret	nipa꞉n	ma꞉pan
Meitei names	ফুন	অমা	অনি	অহুম	মরি	মঙা	তরূক	তরেৎ	নীপান	মাপন
Sylheti names	shuinno	ex	dui	tin	sair	fas	soy	shat/hat	aţ	noy
Sylheti names	শূইন্য	এক (খ)	দুই	তিন	ছাইর	পাচ	ছয়	সাত/হাত	আট	নয়
Maithili names	shūnya	ek	du	tīn	chari	pãch	chhau	sat	aţh	nau
Maithili names	শূন্য	এক	দু	তীন	চাৰি	পাঁচ	ছৌ	সাত	আঠ	নৌ
Kamtapuri names	shuinno	ek/aak	dui	tin	chair	pãch	chhôy	sat	aat	nôy/nôo
Kamtapuri names	শূইন্য	এক/আক	দুই	তিন	চাইর/চাইৰ	পাঁচ	ছয়	সাত	আট	নয়/নও
Hajong names	xuinnô	ek	dui	tin	câr	pas	soy	sat	at	noy
Hajong names	শূন্য	এক	দুই	তিন	চাৰ/চার	পাচ	ছয়	সাত	আট	নয়
Rabha names	tha	sa	niŋ	tham	bri	bwŋ	kröb	sin	gin	suku
Rabha names	থা	ছা	নিং	থাম	ব্ৰি	বৗং	ক্ৰোব	ছিন	গিন	ছুকু
Chittagonian names	shúinnô	ek	dui	tin	sair/sér	fañs	só	śat	añshtô	nô
Chittagonian names	শূইন্য	এক	দুই	তিন	ছাইর/ছের	পাঁচ	ছ	সাত	আঁশ্ট	ন

== Unicode ==
There are three Unicode blocks for Bengali–Assamese script, called Bengali, Bengali Supplement, and Tirhuta. The Bengali block is U+0980–U+09FF:

Bengali^{[1]}^{[2]} Official Unicode Consortium code chart (PDF)
	0	1	2	3	4	5	6	7	8	9	A	B	C	D	E	F
U+098x	ঀ	ঁ	ং	ঃ		অ	আ	ই	ঈ	উ	ঊ	ঋ	ঌ			এ
U+099x	ঐ			ও	ঔ	ক	খ	গ	ঘ	ঙ	চ	ছ	জ	ঝ	ঞ	ট
U+09Ax	ঠ	ড	ঢ	ণ	ত	থ	দ	ধ	ন		প	ফ	ব	ভ	ম	য
U+09Bx	র		ল				শ	ষ	স	হ			়	ঽ	া	ি
U+09Cx	ী	ু	ূ	ৃ	ৄ			ে	ৈ			ো	ৌ	্	ৎ	
U+09Dx								ৗ					ড়	ঢ়		য়
U+09Ex	ৠ	ৡ	ৢ	ৣ			০	১	২	৩	৪	৫	৬	৭	৮	৯
U+09Fx	ৰ	ৱ	৲	৳	৴	৵	৶	৷	৸	৹	৺	৻	ৼ	৽	৾	
Notes 1.As of Unicode version 18.0 2.Grey areas indicate non-assigned code points

The Bengali Supplement block is U+11DF0–U+11DFF:

Bengali Supplement^{[1]}^{[2]} Official Unicode Consortium code chart (PDF)
	0	1	2	3	4	5	6	7	8	9	A	B	C	D	E	F
U+11DFx	𑷰	𑷱														
Notes 1.As of Unicode version 18.0 2.Grey areas indicate non-assigned code points

The Tirhuta block is U+11480–U+114DF:

Tirhuta^{[1]}^{[2]} Official Unicode Consortium code chart (PDF)
	0	1	2	3	4	5	6	7	8	9	A	B	C	D	E	F
U+1148x	𑒀	𑒁	𑒂	𑒃	𑒄	𑒅	𑒆	𑒇	𑒈	𑒉	𑒊	𑒋	𑒌	𑒍	𑒎	𑒏
U+1149x	𑒐	𑒑	𑒒	𑒓	𑒔	𑒕	𑒖	𑒗	𑒘	𑒙	𑒚	𑒛	𑒜	𑒝	𑒞	𑒟
U+114Ax	𑒠	𑒡	𑒢	𑒣	𑒤	𑒥	𑒦	𑒧	𑒨	𑒩	𑒪	𑒫	𑒬	𑒭	𑒮	𑒯
U+114Bx	𑒰	𑒱	𑒲	𑒳	𑒴	𑒵	𑒶	𑒷	𑒸	𑒹	𑒺	𑒻	𑒼	𑒽	𑒾	𑒿
U+114Cx	𑓀	𑓁	𑓂	𑓃	𑓄	𑓅	𑓆	𑓇								
U+114Dx	𑓐	𑓑	𑓒	𑓓	𑓔	𑓕	𑓖	𑓗	𑓘	𑓙						
Notes 1.As of Unicode version 18.0 2.Grey areas indicate non-assigned code points

== See also ==
- Naoriya Phullo script
- Official scripts of the Indian Republic
