= Assamese alphabet =

Writing system of the Assamese language

Assamese Alphabet
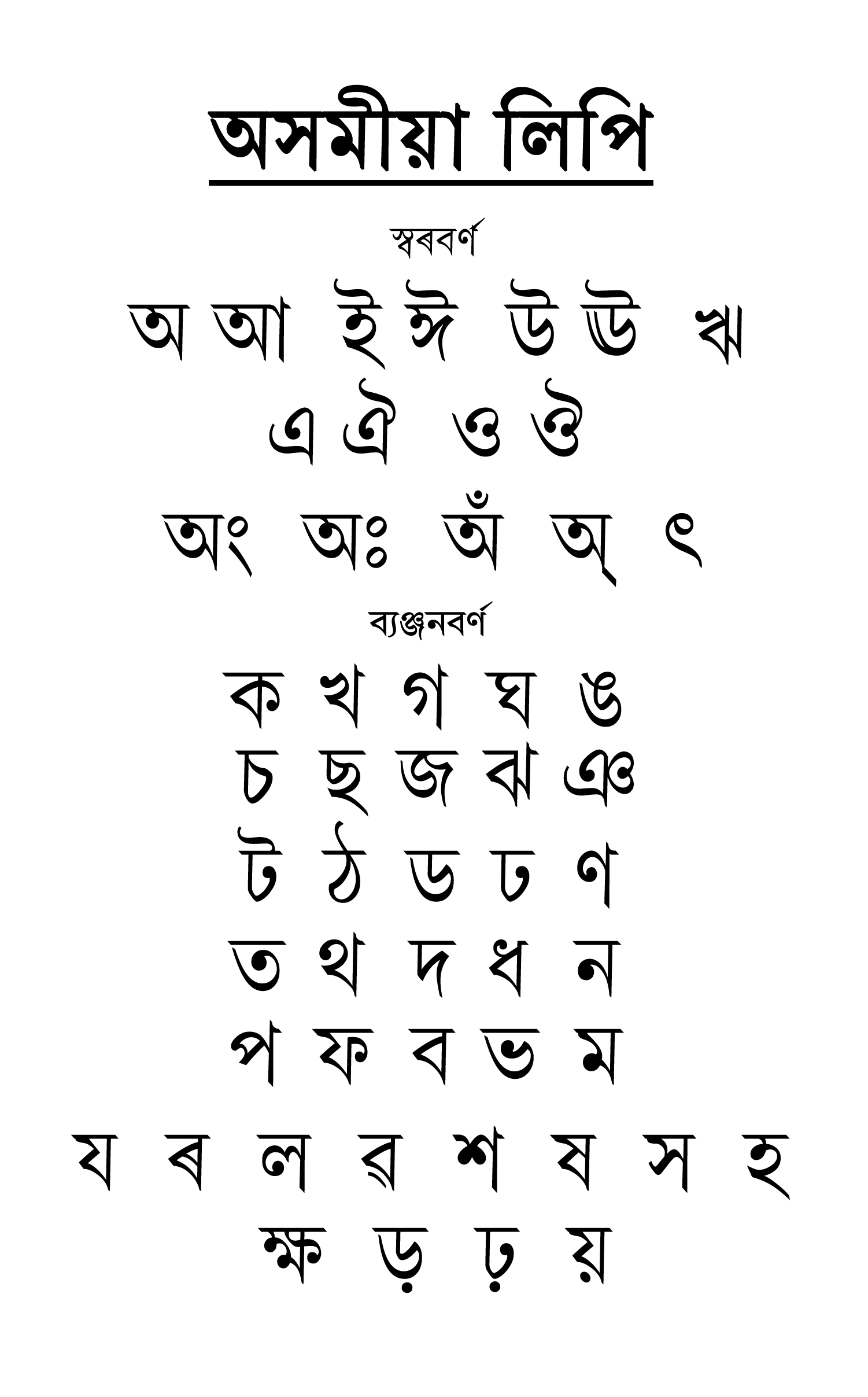
- Assamese Alphabet Chart
- Script type: Abugida
- Period: 19th century to the present
- Direction: Left-to-right
- Region: Assam
- Languages: Assamese, Sanskrit, Rabha, Deori, Mishing, Bodo (formerly) and others.

Related scripts
- Parent systems: Egyptian: Proto-Sinaitic; Phoenician; Aramaic; Brahmi script; Gupta script; Siddhaṃ script; Gaudi script; Bengali script; Assamese Alphabet
- Sister systems: Bengali alphabet

The Assamese alphabet (Assamese: অসমীয়া বৰ্ণমালা, romanized: Ôxômiya Bôrnômala) is a version of the Bengali script that was adopted by the Bengal-based printing press for Assamese in the 19th century and replaced the Assamese script by the 20th century. This alphabet is also used for Sanskrit as well as other languages such as Bodo (now Devanagari), Khasi (now Roman), Mising (now Roman), Jaintia (now Roman) etc. The replacement by this Bengali-based alphabet caused the traditional Assamese script to be mostly illegible to those trained in the current Bengali script, making historical Assamese literature illegible to the vast majority of Assamese speakers. The traditional Assamese script is a continuous development from the 5th-century Umachal/Nagajari-Khanikargaon rock inscriptions written in an eastern variety of the Gupta script, adopting significant traits from the Siddhaṃ script in the 7th century. By the 17th century three styles of the traditional Assamese script could be identified (bamuniya, kaitheli and garhgaya) that converged to a single style following typesetting required for printing. The present standard Assamese alphabet is identical to the Bengali alphabet except for two letters, ৰ (ro) and ৱ (vo); and the letter ক্ষ (khya) has evolved into an individual consonant by itself with its own phonetic quality whereas in the Bengali alphabet it is an original conjunct of two letters (ক + ষ). The ৰ and ৱ historically existed in the Bengali script also.

== History ==
Orunodoi, an Assamese newspaper printed in the Bengali-based Assamese alphabet.

The transition to the current Bengali script-based alphabet from the traditional Assamese script began in 1813 when the Serampore Press published the first Assamese printed book, an Assamese translation of the New Testament titled Natun Niyam. For the "sake of convenience of printing," the Assamese script was abandoned in favour of Bengali movable type blocks incised by Panchanan Karmakar. This decision was made by colonial missionaries without the consultation of the Assamese people or their royalty.

An attempt was made to introduce Assamese features in the printed alphabet by Atmaram Sarma, a translator and blockmaker. It was used to print the second edition of the New Testament in 1833, making it the first printed book in the Assamese script. The Assamese script was also used in Robinson’s ‘’A Grammar of Assamese Language’’ printed in 1839.. However, subsequent printing presses in Calcutta started to use the standard Bengali foundry for Assamese without keeping any unique Assamese letters. And thus the current Assamese alphabet gained prominence, through mass production of printed books, study materials etc which the traditional Assamese script, being used for handwritten manuscripts, couldn't compete and started to decline.

== Letters ==
=== Vowels ===
The script presently has a total of 11 vowel letters, used to represent the eight main vowel sounds of Assamese, along with a number of vowel diphthongs. All of these are used in both Assamese and Bengali, the two main languages using the script. In addition to the vowel system in the Bengali alphabet the Assamese alphabet has an additional "matra" (ʼ) that is used to represent the phonemes অʼ and এʼ. Some of the vowel letters have different sounds depending on the word, and a number of vowel distinctions preserved in the writing system are not pronounced as such in modern spoken Assamese or Bengali. For example, the Assamese script has two symbols for the vowel sound [i] and two symbols for the vowel sound [u]. This redundancy stems from the time when this script was used to write Sanskrit, a language that had a short [i] and a long [iː], and a short [u] and a long [uː]. These letters are preserved in the Assamese script with their traditional names of hôrswô i (lit. 'short i') and dirghô i (lit. 'long i'), etc., despite the fact that they are no longer pronounced differently in ordinary speech.

Vowel signs can be used in conjunction with consonants to modify the pronunciation of the consonant (here exemplified by ক, kô). When no vowel is written, the vowel অ (ô or o) is often assumed. To specifically denote the absence of a vowel, (্) may be written underneath the consonant.

Vowels
Letter	Name of letter	Vowel sign with [kɔ] (ক)	Name of vowel sign	Transliteration	IPA
অ	o	ক (none)	(none)	ko	kɔ
অ or অʼ	ó	ক (none) or কʼ	urdho-comma	kó	ko
আ	a	কা	akar	ka	kaː
ই	hroswo i	কি	hôrswôikar	ki	ki
ঈ	dirgho i	কী	dirghoikar	ki	ki
উ	hroswo u	কু	hroswoukar	ku	ku
ঊ	dirgho u	কূ	dirghoukar	ku	ku
ঋ	ri	কৃ	rikar	kri	kɹi
এ	e	কে	ekar	kê and ke	kɛ and ke
ঐ	oi	কৈ	ôikar	koi	kɔɪ
ও	ü	কো	ükar	kü	kʊ
ঔ	ou	কৌ	oukar	kou	kɔʊ

=== Consonants ===
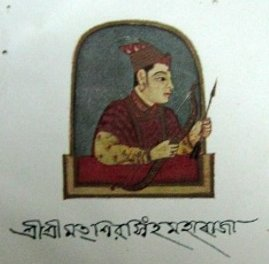
The text says: "Sri Sri Môt Xiwô Xinghô Môharaza". The "র" is used as "ৱ" in this 18th-century manuscript, just as in modern Mithilakshar.

The names of the consonant letters in Assamese are typically just the consonant's main pronunciation plus the inherent vowel ô. Since the inherent vowel is assumed and not written, most letters' names look identical to the letter itself (e.g. the name of the letter ঘ is itself ঘ ghô). Some letters that have lost their distinctive pronunciation in Modern Assamese are called by a more elaborate name. For example, since the consonant phoneme /n/ can be written ন, ণ, or ঞ (depending on the spelling of the particular word), these letters are not simply called no; instead, they are called ন dontyo no ("dental n"), ণ murdhoinnyo no ("retroflex n"), and ঞ inyo. Similarly, the phoneme /x/ can be written as শ taloibbyo xo ("palatal x"), ষ murdhoinnyo xo ("retroflex x"), or স dontyo xo ("dental x"), the phoneme /s/ can be written using চ prothom sô ("first s") or ছ dwitio so ("second s"), and the phoneme /z/ can be written using জ borgio zo ("row z" = "the z included in the five rows of stop consonants") or য ontohstho zo ("z situated between" = "the z that comes between the five rows of stop consonants and the row of sibilants"), depending on the standard spelling of the particular word.

Consonants
Letter	Name of Letter	Transliteration	IPA
ক	ko	k	k
খ	kho	kh	kʰ
গ	go	g	ɡ
ঘ	gho	gh	ɡʱ
ঙ	uŋo	ng	ŋ
চ	prothom so	s	s
ছ	dwitio so	s	sʰ
জ	borgiyo zo	z	z
ঝ	zho	zh	zʱ
ঞ	inyo	y	̃, ɲ
ট	murdhoinyo to	t	t
ঠ	murdhoinyo tho	th	tʰ
ড	murdhoinyo do	d	d
ঢ	murdhoinyo dho	dh	dʱ
ণ	murdhoinyo no	n	n
ত	dontyo to	t	t
থ	dontyo tho	th	tʰ
দ	dontyo do	d	d
ধ	dontyo dho	dh	dʱ
ন	dontyo no	n	n
প	po	p	p
ফ	pho	ph and f	pʰ~ɸ
ব	bo	b	b
ভ	bho	bh and v	bʱ~β
ম	mo	m	m
য	ontohstho zo	z	z
ৰ	ro	r	ɹ
ল	lo	l	l
ৱ	wo	w	w~β
শ	taloibyo xo	x and s	x~s
ষ	murdhoinyo xo	x and s	x~s
স	dontyo xo	x and s	x~s
হ	ho	h	ɦ~h
ক্ষ	khyo	khy, kkh	kʰj
ড়	dore ro	r	ɹ
ঢ়	dhore ro	rh	ɹɦ
য়	ontohstho yô	y	j

Assamese or Asamiya consonants include thirty three pure consonant letters in Assamese alphabet and each letter represents a single sound with an inherent vowel, the short vowel /a /.

The first twenty-five consonants letters are called sporxo borno. These sporxo bornos are again divided into five borgos. Therefore, these twenty-five letters are also called borgio borno.

The Assamese consonants are typically just the consonant's main pronunciation plus the inherent vowel o. The inherent vowel is assumed and not written, thus, names of most letters look identical to the letter itself (e.g. the name of the letter ঘ is itself ঘ gho).

Some letters have lost their distinctive pronunciation in modern Assamese are called by a more elaborate name. For example, since the consonant phoneme /n/ can be written ন, ণ, or ঞ (depending on the spelling of the particular word), these letters are not simply called no; instead, they are called ন dointo no ("dental n"), ণ murdhoinyo no ("cerebral n"), and ঞ nio.

Similarly, the phoneme /x/ can be written as শ taloibyo xo ("palatal x"), ষ murdhonno xo ("cerebral x"), or স dointo xo ("dental x"), the phoneme /s/ can be written using চ prothom so ("first s") or ছ dwitio so ("second s"), and the phoneme /z/ can be written using জ borgio zo ("row z" = "the z included in the five rows of stop consonants") or য ontohstho zo ("z situated between" = "the z that comes between the five rows of stop consonants and the row of sibilants"), depending on the standard spelling of the particular word.

The consonants can be arranged in following groups:

Group: 1 – Gutturals

Consonants	Phonetics
ক	kô
খ	khô
গ	gô
ঘ	ghô
ঙ	ṅgô

Group: 2 – Palatals

Consonants	Phonetics
চ	prôthôm sô
ছ	dwitiyô sô
জ	bôrgiyo jô
ঝ	jhô
ঞ	iñyô

Group: 3 – Cerebrals or Retroflex

Consonants	Phonetics
ট	murdhôinyo ṭa
ঠ	murdhôinyo ṭha
ড	murdhôinyo ḍa
ড়	daré ṛa
ঢ	murdhôinyo ḍha
ঢ়	dharé ṛha
ণ	murdhôinyo ṇa

Group: 4 – Dentals

Consonants	Phonetics
ত	dôntyo ta
ৎ	khanda ṯ
থ	dôntyo tha
দ	dôntyo da
ধ	dôntyo dha
ন	dôntyo na

Group: 5 – Labials

Consonants	Phonetics
প	pa
ফ	pha
ব	ba
ভ	bha
ম	ma

Group: 6 – Semivowels

Consonants	Phonetics
য	ôntôhsthô zô
য়	ôntôhsthô ẏô
ৰ	ra
ল	la
ৱ	wa

Group: 7 – Sibilants

Consonants	Phonetics
শ	talôibyo xô
ষ	mudhôinnya xô
স	dôntyo xô

Group: 8 – Aspirate

Consonants	Phonetics
হ	ha
ক্ষ	khyô

Group: 9 – Anuxāra

Consonants	Phonetics
ং	ṃ anuxar

Group: 9 – Bixarga

Consonants	Phonetics
ঃ	ḥ bixarga

Group: 10 – Chandrabindu (anunāsika)

Consonants	Phonetics
ঁ	n̐, m̐ candrabindu

- The letters শ (talôibyo xô), ষ (murdhôinyo xô), স (dôntyo xô) and হ (hô) are called usma barna
- The letters য (za), ৰ (ra), ল (la) and ৱ (wa) are called ôntôhsthô barna
- The letters ড় (daré ṛa) and ঢ় (dharé ṛha) are phonetically similar to /ra/
- The letter য (ôntôhsthô zô) is articulated like 'ôntôhsthô yô' in the word medial and final position. To denote the ôntôhsthô ẏô, the letter য় (ôntôhsthô ẏô) is used in Assamese
- ৎ (khanda ṯ or hôsôntô t) means the consonant letter Tö (dôntyo ta) without the inherent vowel

==== Halant ====
To write a consonant without the inherent vowel the halant sign is used below the base glyph. In Assamese this sign is called hôsôntô or tôlôr réf (meaning bottom réf). (্)

==== Consonant Conjuncts ====
In Assamese, the combination of three consonants is possible without their intervening vowels. There are about 122 conjunct letters. A few conjunct letters are given below:

==== Anuxôr ====
Anuxôr ( ং ) indicates a nasal consonant sound (velar). When an anuxar comes before a consonant belonging to any of the 5 bargas, it represents the nasal consonant belonging to that barga.

==== Candrabindu ====
Chandrabindu ( ঁ ) denotes nasalization of the vowel that is attached to it .

==== Bixargô ====
Bixargô ( ঃ ) represents a sound similar to /h /.

=== Consonant clusters according to Goswami ===
According to G. C. Goswami, the number of two-phoneme clusters is 143 symbolised by 174 conjunct letters. Three phoneme clusters are 21 in number, which are written by 27 conjunct clusters. A few of them are given hereafter as examples:

Conjunct letters	Transliteration	[Phoneme clusters (with phonetics)
ক + ক	(kô + kô)	ক্ক kkô
ঙ + ক	(ŋô + kô)	ঙ্ক ŋkô
ল + ক	(lô + kô)	ল্ক lkô
স + ক	(xô + kô)	স্ক skô
স + ফ	(xô + phô)	স্ফ sphô
ঙ + খ	(ŋô + khô)	ঙ্খ ŋkhô
স + খ	(xô + khô)	স্খ skhô
ঙ + গ	(ŋô + gô)	ঙ্গ ŋgô
ঙ + ঘ	(ŋô + ghô)	ঙ্ঘ ŋghô
দ + ঘ	(dô + ghô)	দ্ঘ dghô
শ + চ	(xô + sô)	শ্চ ssô
চ + ছ	(sô + shô)	চ্ছ sshô
ঞ + ছ	(ñô + shô)	ঞ্ছ ñshô
ঞ + জ	(ñô + zô)	ঞ্জ ñzô
জ + ঞ	(zô + ñô)	জ্ঞ zñô
ল + ট	(lô + ṭô)	ল্ট lṭô
ণ + ঠ	(ṇô + ṭhô)	ণ্ঠ ṇṭhô
ষ + ঠ	(xô + ṭhô)	ষ্ঠ ṣṭhô
ণ + ড	(ṇô + ḍô)	ণ্ড ṇḍô
ষ + ণ	(xô + ṇô)	ষ্ণ ṣṇô
হ + ন	(hô + nô)	হ hnô
ক + ষ	(kô + xô)	ক্ষ ksô
প + ত	(pô + tô)	প্ত ptô
স + ত	(xô + tô)	স্ত stô
ক + ত	(kô + tô)	ক্ত ktô
গ + ন	(gô + nô)	গ্ন gnô
ম + ন	(mô + nô)	ম্ন mnô
শ + ন	(xô + nô)	শ্ন snô
স + ন	(xô + nô)	স্ন snô
হ + ন	(hô + nô)	হ্ন hnô
ত + থ	(tô + thô)	ত্থ tthô
ন + থ	(nô + thô)	ন্থ nthô
ষ + থ	(xô + thô)	ষ্থ sthô
ন + দ	(nô + dô)	ন্দ ndô
ব + দ	(bô + dô)	ব্দ bdô
ম + প	(mô + pô)	ম্প mpô
ল + প	(lô + pô)	ল্প lpô
ষ + প	(xô + pô)	ষ্প spô
স + প	(xô + pô)	স্প spô
ম + ফ	(mô + phô)	ম্ফ mphô
ষ + ফ	(xô + phô)	স্ফ sphô
দ + ব	(dô + bô)	দ্ব dbô
ম + ব	(mô + bô)	ম্ব mbô
হ + ব	(hô + bô)	হ্ব hbô
দ + ভ	(dô + bhô)	দ্ভ dbhô
ম + ভ	(mô + bhô)	ম্ভ mbhô
ক + ম	(kô + mô)	ক্ম kmô
দ + ম	(dô + mô)	দ্ম dmô
হ + ম	(hô + mô)	হ্ম hmô
ম + ম	(mô + mô)	ম্ম mmô

== Numerals ==
Numerals
Hindu-Arabic numerals	0	1	2	3	4	5	6	7	8	9	10
Assamese numerals	০	১	২	৩	৪	৫	৬	৭	৮	৯	১০
Assamese names	xuinno	ek	dui	tini	sari	pas	soy	xat	ath	no (no')	doh
Assamese names	শূণ্য	এক	দুই	তিনি	চাৰি	পাচ	ছয়	সাত	আঠ	ন, ন'	দহ

== Three distinct variations of the Assamese alphabet from the standard Bengali alphabet ==
Assamese unique characters
Letter	Name of letter	Transliteration	IPA	Bengali
ৰ	rô	r	ɹ	– bôesunnô rô
ৱ	wô	w	w	– (antasthya a)
ক্ষ	khyô	khy	kʰj	– juktokkhyô

Though ক্ষ is used in Bengali as a conjunct letter. The ৰ and ৱ were used in the Bengali script, however, they were dropped when the Bengali alphabet was standardised.

== Assamese keyboard layout ==
- Inscript keyboard layout:

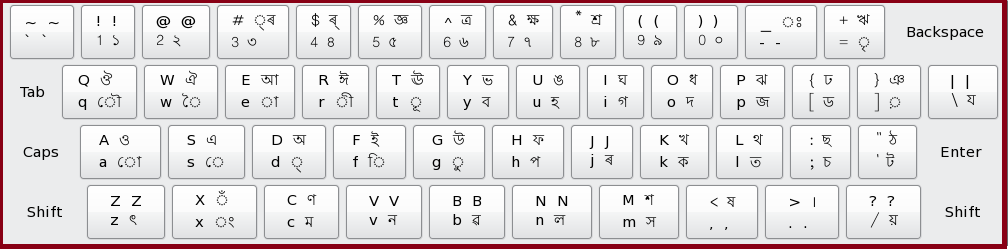

- Phonetic keyboard layout:

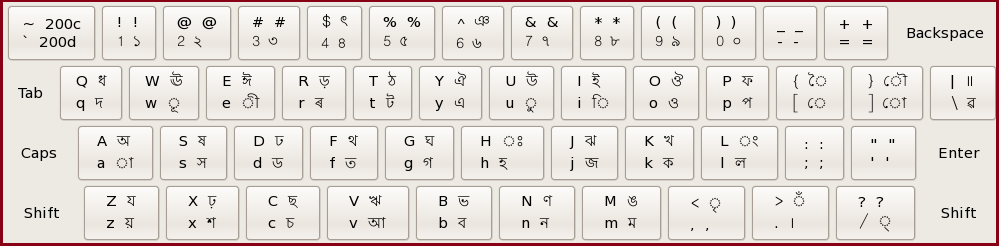

- The unique letter identifiers:

The keyboard locations of three characters unique to the Assamese alphabet are depicted below:

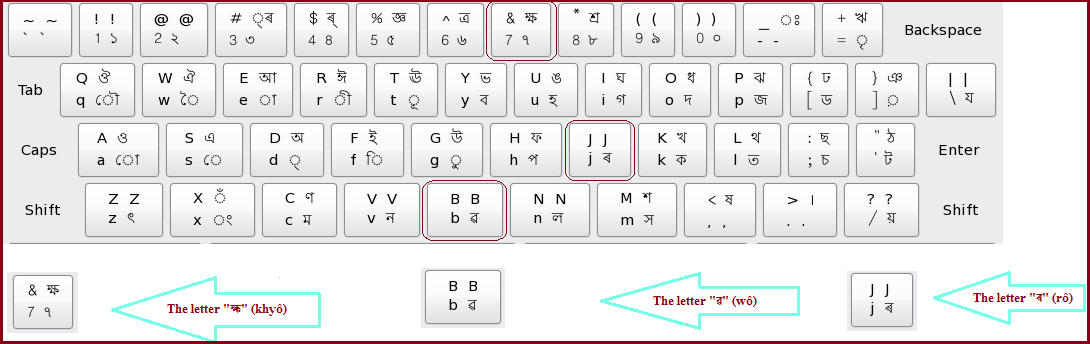

- ITRANS characterisation:

The "Indian languages TRANSliteration" (ITRANS) the ASCII transliteration scheme for Indic scripts here, Assamese; the characterisations are given below:

Keyboard sequence	Character
k	ক্
kh	খ্
g	গ্
gh	ঘ্
~N	ঙ্
N^	ঙ্
ch	চ্
Ch	ছ্
chh	ছ্
j	জ্
jh	ঝ্
~n	ঞ্
JN	ঞ্
T	ট্
Th	ঠ্
D	ড্
Dh	ঢ্
N	ণ্
t	ত্
th	থ্
d	দ্

Keyboard sequence	Character
dh	ধ্
n	ন্
p	প্
ph	ফ্
b	ব্
bh	ভ্
m	ম্
y	য্
r	ৰ্
l	ল্
v	ৱ্
w	ৱ্
sh	শ্
Sh	ষ্
shh	ষ্
s	স্
h	হ্
.D	ড়্
.Dh	ঢ়্
Y	য়্
yh	য়্

Keyboard sequence	Character
GY	জ্ঞ্
dny	জ্ঞ্
x	ক্ষ্
a	অ
aa	আ
A	আ
i	ই
ii	ঈ
I	ঈ
u	উ
uu	ঊ
U	ঊ
RRi	ঋ
R^i	ঋ
LLi	ঌ

Keyboard sequence	Character
L^i	ঌ
e	এ
ai	ঐ
o	ও
au	ঔ
RRI	ৠ
R^I	ৠ
LLI	ৡ
L^I	ৡ
.N	ঁ
.n	ং
M	ং
H	ঃ
.h	্

Keyboard sequence	Character
0	০
1	১
2	২
3	৩
4	৪
5	৫
6	৬
7	৭
8	৮
9	৯
#	্ৰ
$	ৰ্
^	ত্ৰ
*	শ্ৰ
	়

== Sample text ==
The following is a sample text in Assamese of Article 1 of the Universal Declaration of Human Rights:

Assamese in Assamese alphabet

১ম অনুচ্ছেদ: জন্মগতভাৱে সকলো মানুহ মৰ্য্যদা আৰু অধিকাৰত সমান আৰু স্বতন্ত্ৰ। তেওঁলোকৰ বিবেক আছে, বুদ্ধি আছে। তেওঁলোকে প্ৰত্যেকে প্ৰত্যেকক ভ্ৰাতৃভাৱে ব্যৱহাৰ কৰা উচিত।

Assamese in Romanisation 1

Prôthôm ônussêd: Zônmôgôtôbhawê xôkôlû manuh moirjyôda aru odhikarôt xôman aru sôtôntrô. Têû̃lûkôr bibêk asê, buddhi asê. Têû̃lûkê proittêkê proittêkôk bhratribhawê byôwôhar kôra usit.

Assamese in Romanisation 2

Prothom onussed: Jonmogotobhabe xokolü manuh moirjjoda aru odhikarot xoman aru sotontro. Teü̃lükor bibek ase, buddhi ase. Teü̃lüke proitteke proittekok bhratribhawe bebohar kora usit.

Assamese in Romanisation 3

Prothom onussed: Jonmogotovawe xokolu' manuh morjjoda aru odhikarot xoman aru sotontro. Teulu’kor bibek ase, buddhi ase. Teulu’ke proitteke proittekok vratrivawe bewohar kora usit.

Assamese in common chatting romanisation

Prothom onussed: Jonmogotobhawe xokolu manuh morjyoda aru odhikarot xoman aru sotontro. Teulukor bibek ase, buddhi ase. Teuluke proitteke proittekok bhratribhawe byowohar kora usit.

Assamese in IAST Romanisation

Prathama anucchēda: Janmagatabhāve sakalo mānuha maryadā āru adhikārata samāna āru svatantra. Tēõlokara bibēka āchē, buddhi āchē. Tēõlokē pratyēkē pratyēkaka bhrātribhāvē byavahāra karā ucita.

Assamese in the International Phonetic Alphabet

/pɹɔtʰɔm ɔnusːɛd | zɔnmɔɡɔtɔbʰawɛ xɔkɔlʊ manuʱ moizːɔda aɹu odʰikaɹɔt xɔman aɹu s(w)ɔtɔntɹɔ || tɛʊ̃lʊkɔɹ bibɛk asɛ budːʰi asɛ || tɛʊ̃lʊkɛ pɹoitːɛkɛ pɹoitːɛkɔk bʰɹatɹibʰabɛ bɛβɔɦaɹ kɔɹa usit/

Gloss

1st Article: Congenitally all human dignity and right-in equal and free. their conscience exists, intellect exists. They everyone everyone-to brotherly behaviour to-do should.

Translation

Article 1: All human beings are born free and equal in dignity and rights. They are endowed with reason and conscience. Therefore, they should act towards one another in a spirit of brotherhood.

== Unicode ==
The Bengali–Assamese script was added to the Unicode Standard in October 1991 with the release of version 1.0.

The Unicode block for Assamese and Bengali is U+0980–U+09FF:

Bengali^{[1]}^{[2]} Official Unicode Consortium code chart (PDF)
	0	1	2	3	4	5	6	7	8	9	A	B	C	D	E	F
U+098x	ঀ	ঁ	ং	ঃ		অ	আ	ই	ঈ	উ	ঊ	ঋ	ঌ			এ
U+099x	ঐ			ও	ঔ	ক	খ	গ	ঘ	ঙ	চ	ছ	জ	ঝ	ঞ	ট
U+09Ax	ঠ	ড	ঢ	ণ	ত	থ	দ	ধ	ন		প	ফ	ব	ভ	ম	য
U+09Bx	র		ল				শ	ষ	স	হ			়	ঽ	া	ি
U+09Cx	ী	ু	ূ	ৃ	ৄ			ে	ৈ			ো	ৌ	্	ৎ	
U+09Dx								ৗ					ড়	ঢ়		য়
U+09Ex	ৠ	ৡ	ৢ	ৣ			০	১	২	৩	৪	৫	৬	৭	৮	৯
U+09Fx	ৰ	ৱ	৲	৳	৴	৵	৶	৷	৸	৹	৺	৻	ৼ	৽	৾	
Notes 1.As of Unicode version 18.0 2.Grey areas indicate non-assigned code points

== See also ==
- Assamese Braille
- Help:IPA for Assamese
- Romanisation of Assamese
