= Robert Wray =

Robert Wray may refer to:

- Robert O. Wray (born 1957), American businessman and author
- Robert B. Wray, 18th-century English printer
