= Nagari numerals =

Nagari numerals may be,

- Bengali numerals
- Devanagari numerals
