= Ka (Bengali) =

First consonant of the Bengali abugida

The Bengali letter ক is derived from the Siddhaṃ, and is marked by a similar horizontal head line, but less geometric shape, than its Devanagari counterpart, क. The inherent vowel of Bengali consonant letters is /ɔ/, so the bare letter ক will sometimes be transliterated as "kô" instead of "ka". Adding okar, the "o" vowel mark, কো, gives a reading of /ko/.

The Bengali letter ক (Ka)

Like all Indic consonants, ক can be modified by marks to indicate another (or no) vowel than its inherent "a".

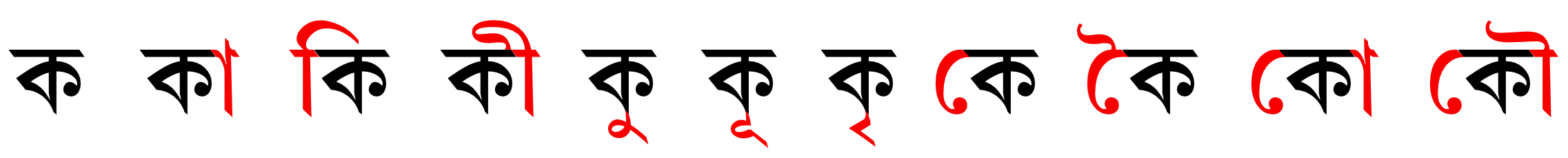

== ক in Bengali-using languages ==
ক is used as a basic consonant character in all of the major Bengali script orthographies, including Bengali and Assamese. It is also used with a nukta, ক়, for foreign borrowings of /q/.

== Conjuncts with ক ==
Bengali ক exhibits conjunct ligatures, as is common in Indic scripts, with a tendency towards stacked ligatures.

- ক্ + ষ [ʃ] gives us the irregular kʃa ligature. The conjunct functions as an independent letter in the Assamese orthography, with a different pronunciation than the Bengali ligature of ক্ + ষ.

- ক্ + স [s] preserves the ক, but reduces the স, giving

- ক্ + ক results in a stacked conjunct

- ঙ্ [ŋ] + ক also gives a stacked conjunct with a somewhat irregular form

- ক্ + র [ɾ] is a fully ligated (irregular) conjunct

== See also ==
- Ka (Indic), for a more general overview encompassing other Indic scripts
