= Bengali Supplement =

- Range: U+11DF0..U+11DFF (16 code points)
- Plane: SMP
- Scripts: Bengali
- Assigned: 2 code points
- Unused: 14 reserved code points

Unicode Version History
- 18.0 (2026): 2 (+2)

Unicode documentation
- Code chart ∣ Web page

Bengali Supplement is a Unicode block containing characters from the Bengali–Assamese script used in historical documents and Sanskrit texts.

== Block ==
Bengali Supplement^{[1]}^{[2]} Official Unicode Consortium code chart (PDF)
	0	1	2	3	4	5	6	7	8	9	A	B	C	D	E	F
U+11DFx	𑷰	𑷱														
Notes 1.As of Unicode version 18.0 2.Grey areas indicate non-assigned code points

== History ==
The following Unicode-related documents record the purpose and process of defining specific characters in the Bengali Supplement block:

Version	Final code points (Note: Proposed code points and characters names may differ from final code points and names)	Count	L2 ID	Document
18.0	U+11DF0	1	L2/24-153	Kučera, Jan; Li, Charles (2024-05-23), Proposal to encode Bengali Sign Combining Anusvara Above
18.0	U+11DF0	1	L2/24-166	Anderson, Deborah; Goregaokar, Manish; Kučera, Jan; Whistler, Ken; Pournader, Roozbeh; Constable, Peter (2024-07-18), "8. Bengali", Recommendations to UTC #180 July 2024 on Script Proposals
18.0	U+11DF0	1	L2/24-159	Constable, Peter (2024-07-29), "Consensus 180-C30", UTC #180 Minutes, "Provisionally assign one Bengali code point U+0984 BENGALI SIGN COMBINING ANUSVARA ABOVE ..."
18.0	U+11DF0	1	L2/25-226	"Consensus 185-C40", UTC #185 Minutes, 2025-10-29, "UTC accepts for encoding in Unicode 18.0 ..."
18.0	U+11DF0	1	L2/26-102	Constable, Peter (2026-04-15), "3. Recommended changes for 18.0", Release Management Group Report to UTC #187
18.0	U+11DF0	1	L2/26-093	"Consensus 187-C2 (Move the code point)", UTC #187 meeting minutes, 2026-04-29
18.0	U+11DF1	1	L2/22-268R	Rajan, Vinodh; Chakraborty, Deepro (2022-12-23), Proposal to Encode Alternate BA for the Bengali Language
18.0	U+11DF1	1	L2/23-012	Anderson, Deborah; et al. (2023-01-17), "3 Bengali", Recommendations to UTC #174 January 2023 on Script Proposals
18.0	U+11DF1	1	L2/23-005	Constable, Peter (2023-02-01), "Consensus 174-C20", UTC #174 Minutes, "Provisionally assign the code point U+09FF for BENGALI LETTER ALTERNATE BA"
18.0	U+11DF1	1	L2/24-006	Constable, Peter (2024-01-31), "Consensus 178-C38", UTC #178 Minutes, "Approve the name change for provisionally assigned character U+09FF from BENGALI LETTER ALTERNATE BA to BENGALI LETTER SANSKRIT BA"
18.0	U+11DF1	1	L2/24-221	Constable, Peter (2024-11-12), "Consensus 181-C60", UTC #181 Minutes, "UTC accepts for encoding in Unicode Version 17.0 the following ..."
18.0	U+11DF1	1	L2/25-181	Leroy, Robin (2025-08-07), "Consensus 184-C2", UTC #184 Minutes, "... removed from Unicode 17.0 and ... targeted instead for Unicode 18.0"
18.0	U+11DF1	1	L2/26-102	Constable, Peter (2026-04-15), "3. Recommended changes for 18.0", Release Management Group Report to UTC #187
18.0	U+11DF1	1	L2/26-093	"Consensus 187-C2 (Move the code point) and 187-C3 (Rename)", UTC #187 meeting minutes, 2026-04-29

== See also ==
- Bengali (Unicode block)
