= Robert B. Wray =

English printer

Robert B. Wray was an English printer known for casting a movable type font for printing Bengali script in 1778. His casting of the Bengali type contributed to the modernization of Bengali language and translation of European books into Bengali. It proved revolutionary for the British rule in India.
