= Kha (Bengali) =

The Bengali letter খ is derived from the Siddhaṃ, and is marked by the lack of a horizontal head line, unlike its Devanagari counterpart, ख. The inherent vowel of Bengali consonant letters is /ɔ/, so the bare letter খ will sometimes be transliterated as "kho" instead of "kha". Adding okar, the "o" vowel mark, খো, gives a reading of /kho/.

Like all Indic consonants, খ can be modified by marks to indicate another (or no) vowel than its inherent "a".

Bengali letter খ (Kha)

== খ in Bengali-using languages ==
খ is used as a basic consonant character in all of the major Bengali script orthographies, including Bengali and Assamese.

== Conjuncts with খ ==
Bengali খ does not exhibit any irregular conjunct ligatures, beyond adding the standard trailing forms of ব, য ya-phala, and র ra-phala, and the leading repha form of র.

- খ্ + ব [kh+ba] gives us the ligature

- খ্ + য [kh+ya] gives us the ligature

- খ্ + র [kh+ra] gives us the ligature

- while র্ + খ [r+kha] gives us the ligature

== See also ==
- Kha (Indic)
