= Romanisation of Assamese =

Romanisation of Assamese is the representation of the Assamese language in the Latin script. Various ways of romanisation systems of Assamese are used.

== See also ==
- Devanagari transliteration
