= Bengali numerals =

System of numerals

Bengali numerals (Bengali: সংখ্যা, romanized: shôṅkha, Assamese: সংখ্যা, romanized: xoiŋkha, Meitei: মশীং; ꯃꯁꯤꯡ, romanized: mashing) are the units of the numeral system, originating from Eastern South Asia, used officially in Bengali, as well as Assamese, and Manipuri. It is also used in Bishnupriya, Chakma and Hajong languages. They are used by more than 350 million people around the world and are a variety of the Hindu–Arabic numeral system.

== Base numbers ==
| Bengali numeral | Arabic numeral | Standard Bengali word | Romanization of Bengali | Standard Assamese word | Romanization of Standard Assamese |
|---|---|---|---|---|---|
| ০ | 0 | শূন্য | shunnô | শূন্য, শূইন | xuinnô, xuin |
| ১ | 1 | এক | æk | এক | êk |
| ২ | 2 | দুই, দু, দো | dui, du, do | দুই | dui |
| ৩ | 3 | তিন, তিনি | tin, | তিনি | tini |
| ৪ | 4 | চার, চারি | char, chari | চাৰি | sari |
| ৫ | 5 | পাঁচ | pãch | পাঁচ | pãs |
| ৬ | 6 | ছয়, ছ | chhôy, chhô | ছয় | sôy |
| ৭ | 7 | সাত | shat | সাত | xat |
| ৮ | 8 | আট | aṭ | আঠ | ath |
| ৯ | 9 | নয়, ন | nôy, nô | ন | nô |

== Extended numbers ==
| Bengali numeral | Arabic numeral | Standard Bengali word | Romanization of Bengali | Standard Assamese | Romanisation of Standard Assamese |
|---|---|---|---|---|---|
| ১০ | 10 | দশ | dôsh | দহ | dôh |
| ১১ | 11 | এগারো | ægaro | এঘাৰ | êgharô |
| ১২ | 12 | বারো | baro | বাৰ | barô |
| ১৩ | 13 | তেরো | tero | তেৰ | têrô |
| ১৪ | 14 | চৌদ্দ, চোদ্দ | chouddô, choddô | চৈধ্য, চৌধ্য | soiddhô, souddhô |
| ১৫ | 15 | পনেরো, পনর | pônero, pônôrô | পোন্ধৰ | pûndhôrô |
| ১৬ | 16 | ষোলো | sholo | ষোল্ল | xûllô |
| ১৭ | 17 | সতেরো, সতর | shôtero, shôtôrô | সোতৰ | xûtôrô |
| ১৮ | 18 | আঠারো, আঠেরো | aṭharo, aṭhero | ওঠৰ | ûthôrô |
| ১৯ | 19 | ঊনিশ, ঊন্নিশ | unish, unnish | ঊনৈচ | unnois |
| ২০ | 20 | বিশ, কুড়ি | bish, kuṛi | বিচ, কুৰি | bis, kuri |
| ২১ | 21 | একুশ | ekush | একৈচ | êkois |
| ৩০ | 30 | ত্রিশ, তিরিশ | trish, tirish | ত্ৰিচ, তিৰিচ | tris, tiris |
| ৩৯ | 39 | ঊনচল্লিশ | unôchôllish | ঊনচল্লিচ | unosollis |
| ৪০ | 40 | চল্লিশ | chôllish | চল্লিচ | sollis |
| ৪৯ | 49 | ঊনপঞ্চাশ | unôpônchash | ঊনপঞ্চাচ | unopônsas |
| ৫০ | 50 | পঞ্চাশ | pônchash | পঞ্চাচ | pônsas |
| ৬০ | 60 | ষাট, ষাটি, ষাইট | shaṭ, shaṭi, shaiṭ | ষাঠি | xathi |
| ৭০ | 70 | সত্তর | shôttôr | সত্তৰ | xôttôr |
| ৮০ | 80 | আশি | ashi | আশী | axi |
| ৯০ | 90 | নব্বই, নব্বুই | nôbbôi, nôbbui | নব্বৈ | nôbboi |
| ১০০ | 100 | শত, একশ | shôtô, ækshô | শ, এশ | xô, êxô |
| ১০০০ | 1,000 | এক হাজার, সহস্র | æk hajar, shôhôsrô | হাজাৰ, হেজাৰ, এহাজাৰ, এহেজাৰ | hazar, hêzar, êhazar, êhêzar |
| ১০,০০০ | 10,000 | দশ হাজার, এক অযুত | dôsh hajar, æk ôjut | দহ হাজাৰ/হেজাৰ, অযুত, এক অযুত | dôh hazar/hêzar, ozut, êk ozut |
| ১,০০,০০০ | 100,000 | লক্ষ, লাখ | lôkkhô, lakh | লাখ, এক লাখ | lakh, êk lakh |
| ১০,০০,০০০ | 1,000,000 | দশ লক্ষ, দশ লাখ, এক নিযুত | dôsh lôkkhô, dôsh lakh, æk nijut | দহ লাখ, নিযুত, এক নিযুত | dôh lakh, nizut, êk nizut |
| ১,০০,০০,০০০ | 10,000,000 | কোটি, ক্রোড়, করোড় | koṭi, kroṛ, kôroṛ | কোটি, এক কোটি | kuti, êk kuti |
| ১০,০০,০০,০০০ | 100,000,000 | দশ কোটি | dôsh koṭi | দহ কোটি | dôh kuti |

An example of the number string: -

1065. One thousand sixty-five.
১০৬৫. এক হাজার পঁয়ষট্টি। (in Bengali)

১০৬৫. এহেজাৰ পঁষষ্ঠি। (in Assamese)

== Fractions ==
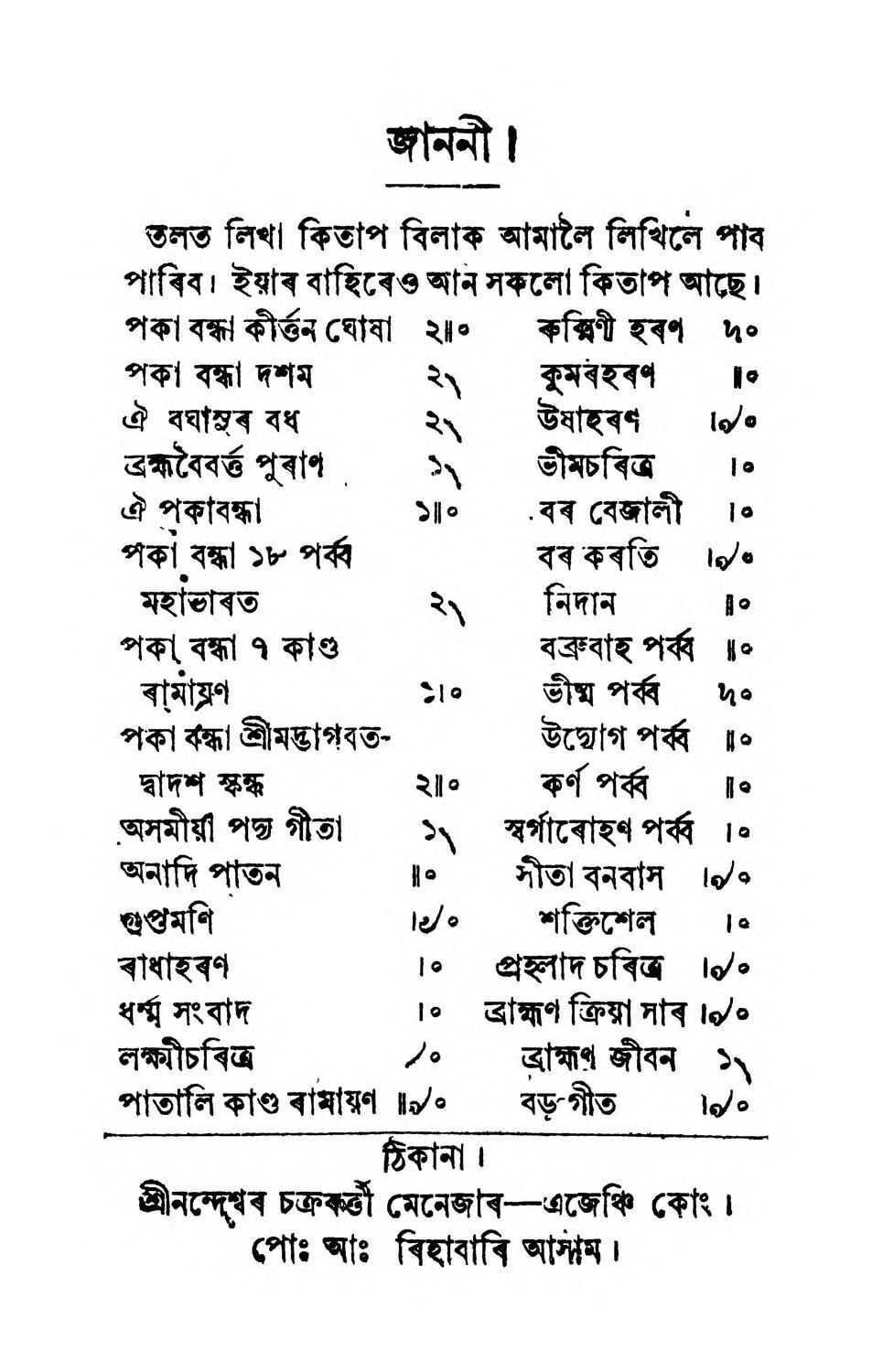
A book list from 1908, with prices in rupees and anna. The price at top left is ২৷৷৹ (2 Rupees and 8 Anas, or 2½ Rupees), top right ৸৹ (12 Anas or ¾ Rupees).

The Bengali script has a separate set of digits for base-16 fractions:

| Symbol | Name | Fractional value | Other names |
|---|---|---|---|
| ৴৹ | 1 ānā | 1/16 | ১ আনা |
| ৵৹ | 2 ānā | 2/16 | |
| ৶৹ | 3 ānā | 3/16 | |
| ৷৹ | 4 ānā | 4/16 = 1/4 | সিকি, পোয়া, "সোয়া-" |
| ৷৴৹ | 5 ānā | 5/16 | |
| ৷৵৹ | 6 ānā | 6/16 | |
| ৷৶৹ | 7 ānā | 7/16 | |
| ৷৷৹ | 8 ānā | 8/16 = 1/2 | আধুলি, "সাড়ে-" |
| ৷৷৴৹ | 9 ānā | 9/16 | |
| ৷৷৵৹ | 10 ānā | 10/16 | |
| ৷৷৶৹ | 11 ānā | 11/16 | |
| ৸৹ | 12 ānā | 12/16 = 3/4 | "পৌনে-" |
| ৸৴৹ | 13 ānā | 13/16 | |
| ৸৵৹ | 14 ānā | 14/16 | |
| ৸৶৹ | 15 ānā | 15/16 | |
| ১৲ | 16 ānā | 16/16 = 1 | ১ টাকা |

This system was the norm for pricing before decimalization of the currency: ২৲ (৳2), ২৷৷৹ (৳2-8, or 2 taka 8 annas).

== See also ==
- Bengali-Assamese script
- Sylhet Nagari
