= Bangladeshi taka sign =

Currency symbol for the Bangladeshi taka

৳

Bangladeshi taka sign
- In Unicode: U+09F3 ৳ BENGALI RUPEE SIGN

Currency
- Currency: Bangladeshi Taka

Related
- See also: U+09F3 ৳ BENGALI RUPEE SIGN (Bangladesh, and India)

The Bangladeshi taka sign (৳) is the currency symbol for the Bangladeshi taka (ISO 4217: BDT), the official currency of Bangladesh. The sign has been a part of unicode since version 1.0 owing to usage in historical texts. The international three-letter currency code for the Bangladeshi taka is BDT.

== Design ==
The design is morphed from the Bangla letter "ট" of the word "টাকা", meaning money.

== Unicode ==
The symbol has been present from the first version of unicode as the fourth Bengali currency symbol.

The symbol is also sometimes used to denote the Indian rupee in texts written in Bengali, one of India's Eighth Schedule languages, which is why the symbol is called BENGALI RUPEE SIGN in Unicode.

On systems running Ubuntu, most other Linux distributions and ChromeOS, the symbol may be typed using Ctrl+⇧ Shift+u 09F3Space (or simply AltGr+4 if the 'Bengali' language setting is used).

== Character mappings ==
Character information
Preview	৳	
Unicode name	BANGLADESHI TAKA SIGN	
Encodings	decimal	hex
Unicode	2547	U+09F3
UTF-8	224 167 179	E0 A7 B3
Numeric character reference	&#2547;	&#x9F3;

== See also ==
- History of the taka
- Bangladeshi taka
