= Assamese rô =

Assamese literature অসমীয়া সাহিত্য
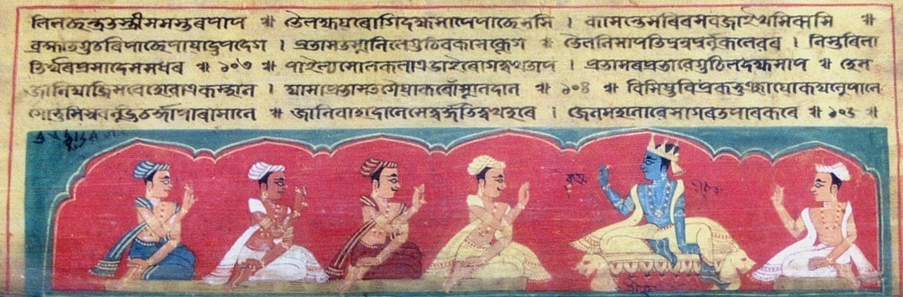
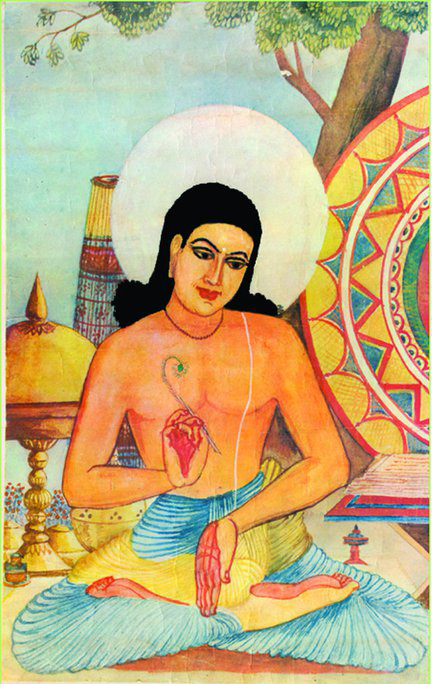
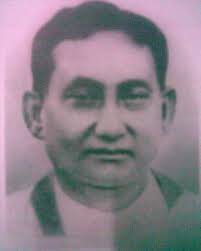
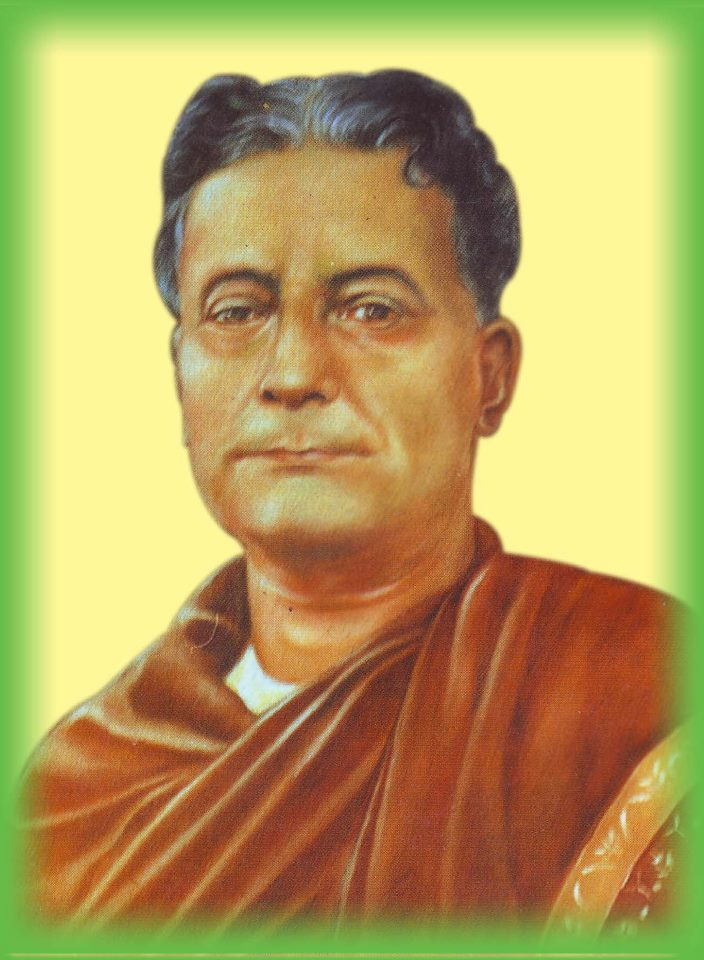
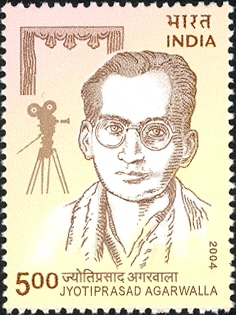
- Assamese literature (by category); Assamese

Assamese literary history
- History of Assamese literature

Assamese language authors
- List of Assamese writers

Assamese writers
- Dramatists & playwrights • Poets • Writers

Forms
- Books – Poetry; Ankia Naats – Bhaona – Borgeets – Buranjis

Institutions & awards
- Asam Sahitya Sabha; Assam Lekhika Samaroh Samiti; Assam Ratna; Assam Valley Literary Award; Kamal Kumari National Award

Assamese rô in combination with various vowels

Rô (Assamese: ৰ /ɹɔ/) is a character distinctive to the Assamese alphabet. In the Assamese alphabet, it is the twenty-seventh consonant, or in other terms, twenty-seventh letter of the byônzônbôrnômala (ব্যঞ্জনবৰ্ণমালা).

== When vowels are added ==
Two common variations of Asamiya Rô.

Rô has an inherent vowel in it, which is ô, as in most other Assamese consonants. But, many a times, ô is to be replaced by another vowel or swôrôbôrnô. In such a case, the vowels change their forms.

As examples:

- ৰ + আ = ৰা
- ৰ + ই = ৰি
- ৰ + ঈ = ৰী
- ৰ + উ = ৰু
- ৰ + ঊ = ৰূ
- ৰ + ঋ = ৰৃ
- ৰ + এ = ৰে
- ৰ + ঐ = ৰৈ
- ৰ + ও = ৰো
- ৰ + ঔ = ৰৌ

== Words starting with ৰ ==
Given below are examples of words starting with ৰ.

- ৰং (/ɹɔŋ/) which means color
- ৰঙা (/ɹɔŋa/) which means red
- ৰজা (/ɹɔza/) which means king

== When added to other consonants ==
=== Reph (ৰেফ) ===
When ৰ is added before another consonant to form a conjunct, ৰ turns into reph. In other words, reph indicates that there is a r sound before the letter it is used before.

For example:

- ৰ + ক = ৰ্ক
- ৰ + খ = ৰ্খ
- ৰ + ঘ = ৰ্ঘ
- ৰ + ছ = ৰ্ছ
- ৰ + জ = ৰ্জ
- ৰ + প = ৰ্প
- ৰ + ম = ৰ্ম
- ৰ + য = ৰ্য etc.

Examples of words are আৰ্জন (arzon, which means 'gain'), কৰ্তা (korta, which means 'doer') etc.

=== Rô-kar (ৰ-কাৰ) ===
When ৰ is added after another consonant, ৰ changes into rô-kar. In other words, rô-kar after a consonant means that there is a rô sound after it.

For example:

- ব + ৰ = ব্ৰ
- প + ৰ = প্ৰ
- স + ৰ = স্ৰ
- ল + ৰ = ল্ৰ
- শ + ৰ = শ্ৰ etc.

Some consonants change their shape when rô-kar is added.

For example:

- ক + ৰ = ক্ৰ
- ভ + ৰ = ভ্ৰ
- ত + ৰ = ত্ৰ
