= Louis LaRavoire Morrow =

Roman Catholic bishop in India

The Most Reverend Louis LaRavoire Morrow S.D.B.
- Bishop Emeritus of Krishnangar
- Other posts: Founder, Sisters of Mary Immaculate; catechetical author

Orders
- Ordination: 21 May 1921 (priest)
- Consecration: 29 October 1939 (bishop)

Personal details
- Born: 24 December 1892 Weatherford, Texas, United States
- Died: 31 August 1987 (aged 94) Krishnanagar, West Bengal, India
- Denomination: Roman Catholic
- Coat of arms

Louis LaRavoire Morrow, S.D.B. (24 December 1892 – 31 August 1987) was an American-born Roman Catholic bishop, Salesian of Don Bosco, missionary, and author. He served as Bishop of Krishnangar (West Bengal, India) from 1939 to 1969; founded the Sisters of Mary Immaculate congregation; and wrote several catechetical works that were widely used in Catholic schools.

== Early life ==
Morrow was born on 24 December 1892 in Weatherford, Texas. His family later moved to Mexico, where he completed his education. He joined the Salesians of Don Bosco and was ordained a priest on 21 May 1921.

== Episcopal ministry ==
On 29 October 1939 Morrow was consecrated bishop and took charge of the Diocese of Krishnangar. He spent thirty years leading the diocese, focusing on building schools, churches, and charitable institutions. In 1948 he founded the Sisters of Mary Immaculate (SMI), a congregation dedicated to education, health care, and social work. The novitiate opened in 1950, and the first professions were made in 1952. In 1965 he inaugurated the new motherhouse and chapel of the congregation in Krishnangar.

== Institutions and schools ==
Morrow encouraged education and helped establish several schools and parishes in the diocese.

- In January 1959, he supported the foundation of Bishop Morrow School, which later became affiliated with the ICSE and ISC boards.
- In 1973, inspired by his legacy, the Sisters of Mary Immaculate founded Chapra Mary Immaculate High School (H.S.), which continues to serve the community today.

He also promoted the building and renovation of parish churches, including the cathedral in Krishnangar.

== Later life and death ==
Morrow resigned as Bishop of Krishnangar in 1969 and retired from active ministry. He continued to revise his catechetical writings and remained close to the SMI community. He died on 31 August 1987.

== Selected works ==
Morrow is best remembered for his catechetical books, many of which were used in schools and parishes for decades.

- My Catholic Faith (later revised as Our Catholic Faith), a catechism for adults and youth.
- My Bible History, a simplified Old Testament history for students.
