= Ujjal Biswas =

Indian politician (1954–2026)

Minister of Science, Technology & Bio-technology Government of West Bengal
- In office 3 August 2022 – 4 May 2026
- Governor: C .V. Ananda Bose
- Chief Minister: Mamata Banerjee
- Preceded by: Ratna De (Nag)

Member of the West Bengal Legislative Assembly
- In office 13 May 2011 – 4 May 2026
- Succeeded by: Sadhan Ghosh
- Constituency: Krishnanagar Dakshin

Personal details
- Born: 17 June 1954 Krishnanagar, Nadia district, West Bengal, India
- Died: 11 November 2026 (aged 72) Kolkata, West Bengal, India
- Party: All India Trinamool Congress

Ujjal Biswas (17 June 1954 – 11 November 2026) was an Indian politician who served as the Minister of the Science, Technology and Bio-Technology department in the Government of West Bengal. Until 2022, he was the minister for correctional administration. He was also an MLA, elected from the Krishnanagar Dakshin constituency of Nadia district in the 2011 West Bengal state assembly election. Biswas lost the 2026 Bengal elections to BJP's Sadhan Ghosh.

== Background ==
Ujjal Biswas was from a Mahishya family of freedom fighters who participated in various agitations against the British rule, such as Indigo revolt leader Digambar Biswas, under whose leadership the indigo farmers protested against the European Indigo planters.

Anushilan Samiti revolutionary Basanta Kumar Biswas and independence activist Manmathanath Biswas were from the same family.

Biswas died from multiple organ failure on 11 November 2026, at the age of 72.
