= Baruihuda =

- Census Town
- Location in West Bengal, India Baruihuda (India)
- Coordinates: 23.37762°N 88.48941°E
- Country: India
- State: West Bengal
- District: Nadia

Area
  - Total: 1.85 km^{2} (0.71 sq mi)

Population (2011)
  - Total: 11,574
  - Density: 6,260/km^{2} (16,200/sq mi)

Languages
  - Official: Bengali, English
- Time zone: UTC+5:30 (IST)
- ISO 3166 code: IN-WB
- Vehicle registration: WB
- Website: wb.gov.in

Baruihuda is a census town in the Krishnanagar I CD block in the Krishnanagar Sadar subdivision of the Nadia district in the state of West Bengal, India.

== Geography ==
Cities and towns in Krishnanagr Sadar subdivision of Nadia district
M: municipal town/ city, CT: census town, R: rural/ urban centre, H: place of historical/ religious interest, T: place of tourist interest.
Owing to space constraints in the small map, the actual locations in a larger map may vary slightly

=== Location ===
Baruihuda is located at 23.37762°N 88.48941°E.

=== Area overview ===
Nadia district is mostly alluvial plains lying to the east of Hooghly River, locally known as Bhagirathi. The alluvial plains are cut across by such distributaries as Jalangi, Churni and Ichhamati. With these rivers getting silted up, floods are a recurring feature. The Krishnanagar Sadar subdivision, presented in the map alongside, has the Bhagirathi on the west, with Purba Bardhaman district lying across the river. The long stretch along the Bhagirathi has many swamps. The area between the Bhagirathi and the Jalangi, which flows through the middle of the subdivision, is known as Kalantar, a low-lying tract of black clay soil. A big part of the subdivision forms the Krishnanagar-Santipur Plain, which occupies the central part of the district. The Jalangi, after flowing through the middle of the subdivision, turns right and joins the Bhagirathi. On the south-east, the Churni separates the Krishnanagar-Santipur Plain from the Ranaghat-Chakdaha Plain. The east forms the boundary with Bangladesh. The subdivision is moderately urbanized. 20.795% of the population lives in urban areas and 79.205% lives in rural areas.

Note: The map alongside presents some of the notable locations in the subdivision. All places marked in the map are linked in the larger full screen map. All the four subdivisions are presented with maps on the same scale – the size of the maps vary as per the area of the subdivision.

== Demographics ==
According to the 2011 Census of India, Baruihuda had a total population of 11,574, of which 5,864 (51%) were males and 5,610 (49%) were females. Population in the age range 0–6 years was 1,165. The total number of literate persons in Baruihuda was 7,296 (70.09% of the population over 6 years).

The following municipality and census towns were part of Krishnanagar Urban Agglomeration in 2011 census: Krishnanagar (M), Baruihuda (CT), Paschimbhatjangla (CT) and Sonda.

As of 2001 India census, Baruihuda had a population of 9,575. Males constitute 51% of the population and females 49%. Baruihuda has an average literacy rate of 58%, lower than the national average of 59.5%; with 58% of the males and 42% of females literate. 14% of the population is under 6 years of age.

== Infrastructure ==
According to the District Census Handbook 2011, Nadia, Baruihuda covered an area of 1.85 km^{2}. Among the civic amenities, the protected water supply involved tap water from treated sources. It had 1,352 domestic electric connections. Among the medical facilities it had 1 medicine shop. Among the educational facilities it had were 5 primary schools, 1 middle school, 1 senior secondary school. It had the branch office of 1 agricultural credit society.

== Healthcare ==
Bishnupur Rural Hospital, with 30 beds at Bishnupur, is the major government medical facility in the Krishnanagr I CD block.
