= Krishnanagar Academy =

School in West Bengal

Coordinates: 23.3931°N 88.4939°E

Krishnanagar Academy is a higher secondary school, affiliated to CISCE, in Krishnanagar, Nadia, West Bengal, India. This is an English Medium School. There are many other English Medium schools in Nadia Like St Mary's English School. Ranaghat Convent of Jesus and Mary, Ranaghat, BMS (Bishop Morrow School), Krishnanagar, etc. These schools are in Nadia District, having a population of more than 41 lakhs. Krishnanagar Academy is situated on a land measuring 2.32 acres and there are two football grounds.

== History ==
Krishnanagar Academy was registered and opened in 1981, as an English language school, in a house which had formerly been the home of the Late Babu Ramtanu Lahiri, a Bengali intellectual. The school was started with three classes in the Pre-Primary section and five class in the Primary section. After starting Class VII, an application for a No-Objection Certificate (necessary for affiliation with the council for I.C.S.E., Delhi) was submitted to the Government of West Bengal in 1983. After much correspondence and several inspections, the school was upgraded to class X standard in 1988 and students began preparing for the final exam.
