= Grace Cottage, Krishnanagar =

Heritage building in West Bengal

Grace Cottage, Krishnanagar is a Government office building and heritage site. It is situated at Bowbazar, Krishnanagar in Nadia district in the Indian state of West Bengal. Presently the building houses an office of West Bengal State Electricity Distribution Company.

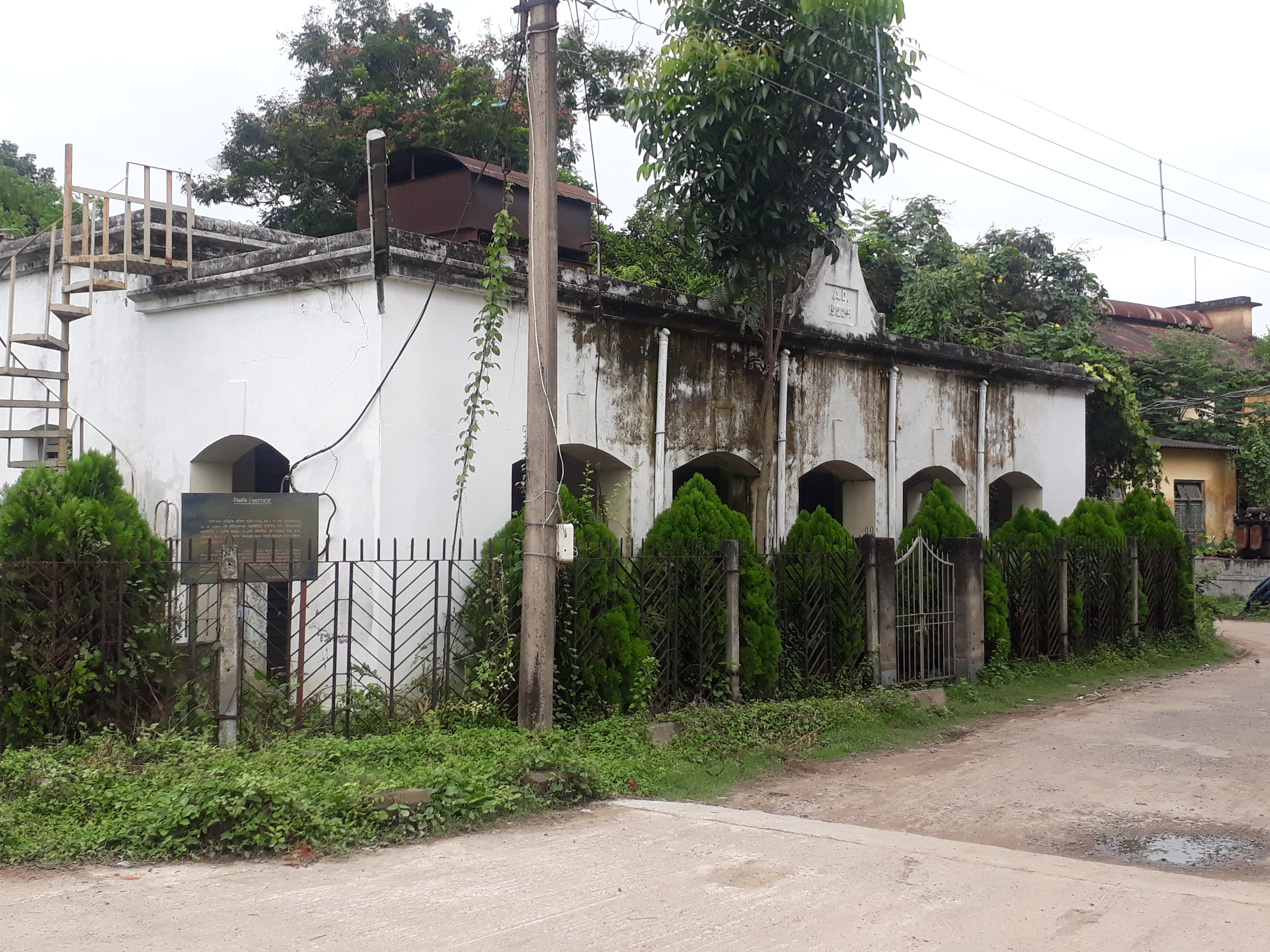
Grace Cottage in Krishnanagar

== History ==
During the British period, a power station was situated in Grace Cottage complex. Poet Kazi Nazrul Islam stayed there between 1926 and 1928. His first child Bulbul was born and mother Zahida died there. Nazrul wrote number of his famous poems, namely Daridro, Phani Manasa, Samyabadi, Puber Hawa and the novel Mrityu Khudha in the rented house. On 25 August 2012 the Grace Cottage was renovated and got heritage status by the West Bengal Heritage Commission.
