= Krishnanagar I =

- Community development block
- Coordinates: 23.3773198°N 88.4361649°E
- Country: India
- State: West Bengal
- District: Nadia

Government
  - Type: Community development block

Area
  - Total: 273.19 km^{2} (105.48 sq mi)
- Elevation: 17 m (56 ft)

Population (2011)
  - Total: 314,833
  - Density: 1,152.4/km^{2} (2,984.8/sq mi)

Languages
  - Official: Bengali, English

Literacy (2011)
  - Total literates: 201,405 (71.45%)
- Time zone: UTC+5:30 (IST)
- PIN: 741401 (Dignagar); 741161 (Assannagar)
- Telephone/STD code: 03472
- Vehicle registration: WB-51, WB-52
- Lok Sabha constituency: Krishnanagar
- Vidhan Sabha constituency: Krishnanagar Uttar, Krishnanagar Dakshin
- Website: nadia.nic.in

Krishnanagar I is a community development block that forms an administrative division in Krishnanagar Sadar subdivision of Nadia district in the Indian state of West Bengal.

== Geography ==
Bhaluka, a constituent panchayat in this block, is located at 23°22′38″N 88°26′10″E.

Krishnanagar I CD Block is bounded by Krishnanagar II and Chapra CD Blocks in the north, Krishnaganj and Hanskhali CD Blocks in the east, Santipur CD Block in the south and Nabadwip CD Block in the west.

Nadia district is mostly alluvial plains lying to the east of Hooghly River, locally known as the Bhagirathi. The alluvial plains are cut across by such distributaries as the Jalangi, Churni and Ichhamati. With these rivers getting silted up, floods are common.

Krishnnagar I CD Block has an area of 273.19 km^{2}. It has 1 panchayat samity, 12 gram panchayats, 236 gram sansads (village councils), 92 mouzas and 87 inhabited villages. Krishnanagar police station serves this block. Headquarters of this CD Block is at Ruipukur.

Gram panchayats of Krishnanagar I block/ panchayat samiti are: Asannagar, Bhaluka, Bhandarkhola, Bhatjangla, Bhimpur, Chakdignagar, Deypara, Dignagar, Dogachi, Joania, Poragacha and Ruipukur.

== Demographics ==
=== Population ===
As per the 2011 Census of India, Krishnagar I CD Block had a total population of 314,833, of which 285,855 were rural and 28,948 were urban. There were 162,086 (51%) males and 152,747 (49%) females. The population below 6 years of age was 32,969. Scheduled Castes numbered 113,204 (35.96%) and Scheduled Tribes numbered 16,019 (5.09%).

As per the 2001 census, Krishnanagar I block had a total population of 280,254, out of which 144,462 were males and 135,792 were females. Krishnagar I block registered a population growth of 25.13 per cent during the 1991-2001 decade. Decadal growth for the district was 19.51 per cent. Decadal growth in West Bengal was 17.84 per cent.

There are three census towns in Krishnanagar I CD Block (2011 census figures in brackets): Sonda (P) (4,511), Baruihuda (11,474) and Paschimbhatjangla (12,963).

Large villages (with 4,000+ population) in Krishnanagar I CD Block were (2011 census figures in brackets): Hara Nagar (4,137), Rui Pukur (P) (7,823), Simul Tala (4,936), Sabarna Behar (15,461), Amghata (8,037), Usidpur (5,847), Bhaluka (14,653), Dignagar (6,023), Itla (6,097), Jahangirpur (6,144), Krishnanagar (P) (13,640), Naldaha (6,447), Kulgachhi (5,003), Jatrapur (6,464), Dogachhi (P) (7,012), Jalalkhali (8,251), Dakshinjhitkipota (8,816), Durgapur (4,929), Senpur (7,286), Asannagar (12,794), Dafarpota (9,295) and Bhimpur (8,057).

Other villages in Krishnanagar I CD Block include (2011 census figures in brackets): Bhandarkhola (3,992), Poragachha (2,133), Chakdignagar (1,548) and Joania (2,065).

=== Literacy ===
As per the 2011 census, the total number of literates in Krishnanagar I CD Block was 201,405 (71.45% of the population over 6 years) out of which males numbered 111,272 (76.50% of the male population over 6 years) and females numbered 90,133 (66.08% of the female population over 6 years). The gender disparity (the difference between female and male literacy rates) was 10.42%.

See also – List of West Bengal districts ranked by literacy rate

Literacy in CD blocks of
Nadia district
Tehatta subdivision
Karimpur I – 67.70%
Karimpur II – 62.04%
Tehatta I – 70.72%
Tehatta II – 68.52%
Krishnanagar Sadar subdivision
Kaliganj – 65.89%
Nakashipara – 64.86%
Chapra – 68.25%
Krishnanagar I – 71.45%
Krishnanagar II – 68.52%
Nabadwip – 67.72%
Krishnaganj – 72.86%
Ranaghat subdivision
Hanskhali – 80.11%
Santipur – 73.10%
Ranaghat I – 77.61%
Ranaghat II – 79.38%
Kalyani subdivision
Chakdaha – 64.17%
Haringhata – 82.15%
Source: 2011 Census: CD Block Wise
Primary Census Abstract Data

=== Language and religion ===
Religion in Krishnanagar I CD block (2011)
Hinduism	82.78%
Islam	15.25%
Tribal religion	1.12%
Christianity	0.79%
Other or not stated	0.06%

In the 2011 census, Hindus numbered 260,607 and formed 82.78% of the population in Krishnanagar I CD Block. Muslims numbered 47,998 and formed 15.25% of the population. Christians numbered 2,482 and formed 0.79% of the population. Others numbered 3,746 and formed 1.18% of the population.

In the 2001 census, Hindus numbered 311,840 and formed 77.09% of the combined population of Krisnanagar I and Krishnanagar II CD Blocks. Muslims numbered 90,806 and formed 22.45% of the combined population. In the 1991 census, Hindus numbered 255,189 and formed 77.32% of the combined population of Krishnanagar I and Krishnanagar II CD Blocks. Muslims numbered 73,355 and formed 22.23% of the combined population.

Languages in Krishnanagar I CD block (2011)
1. Bengali (95.8%)
2. Sadri (2.34%)
3. Hindi (1.13%)
4. Others (0.69%)

At the time of the 2011 census, 95.84% of the population spoke Bengali, 2.34% Sadri and 1.13% Hindi as their first language.

== Rural poverty ==
The District Human Development Report for Nadia has provided a CD Block-wise data table for Modified Human Vulnerability Index of the district. Krishnanagar I CD Block registered 34.97 on the MHPI scale. The CD Block-wise mean MHVI was estimated at 33.92. A total of 8 out of the 17 CD Blocks in Nadia district were found to be severely deprived when measured against the CD Block mean MHVI - Karimpur I and Karimpur II (under Tehatta subdivision), Kaliganj, Nakashipara, Chapra, Krishnanagar I and Nabadwip (under Krishnanagar Sadar subdivision) and Santipur (under Ranaghat subdivision) appear to be backward.

As per the Human Development Report 2004 for West Bengal, the rural poverty ratio in Nadia district was 28.35%. The estimate was based on Central Sample data of NSS 55th round 1999–2000.

== Economy ==
=== Livelihood ===
In Krishnanagar I CD Block in 2011, amongst the class of total workers, cultivators formed 16.52%, agricultural labourers 32.80%, household industry workers 11.47% and other workers 39.21%.

The southern part of Nadia district starting from Krishnanagar I down to Chakdaha and Haringhata has some urban pockets specialising in either manufacturing or service related economic activity and has reflected a comparatively higher concentration of population but the urban population has generally stagnated. Nadia district still has a large chunk of people living in the rural areas.

=== Infrastructure ===
There are 87 inhabited villages in Krishnanagar I CD Block. 100% villages have power supply and drinking water supply. 20 Villages (22.99%) have post offices. 84 villages (96.55%) have telephones (including landlines, public call offices and mobile phones). 54 villages (62.07%) have a pucca approach road and 53 villages (60.92%) have transport communication (includes bus service, rail facility and navigable waterways). 17 villages (19.54%) have agricultural credit societies and 16 villages (18.39%) have banks. It should, however, be noted that although 100% villages in Nadia district had power supply in 2011, a survey in 2007-08 revealed that less than 50% of households had electricity connection. In rural areas of the country, the tube well was for many years considered to be the provider of safe drinking water, but with arsenic contamination of ground water claiming public attention it is no longer so. Piped water supply is still a distant dream. In 2007–08, the availability of piped drinking water in Nadia district was as low as 8.6%, well below the state average of around 20%.

=== Agriculture ===
Persons engaged in agriculture
in Krishnanagar I CD Block
1. Bargadars (6.07%)
2. Patta holders (9.37%)
3. Small farmers (5.41%)
4. Marginal farmers (24.8%)
5. Agricultural labourers (54.3%)

Although the Bargadari Act of 1950 recognised the rights of bargadars to a higher share of crops from the land that they tilled, it was not implemented fully. Large tracts, beyond the prescribed limit of land ceiling, remained with the rich landlords. From 1977 onwards major land reforms took place in West Bengal. Land in excess of land ceiling was acquired and distributed amongst the peasants. Following land reforms land ownership pattern has undergone transformation. In 2013–14, persons engaged in agriculture in Krishnanagar I CD Block could be classified as follows: bargadars 6.07%, patta (document) holders 9.37%, small farmers (possessing land between 1 and 2 hectares) 5.41%, marginal farmers (possessing land up to 1 hectare) 24.81% and agricultural labourers 54.34%. As the proportion of agricultural labourers is very high, the real wage in the agricultural sector has been a matter of concern.

Krishnanagar I CD Block had 186 fertiliser depots, 5 seed stores and 118 fair price shops in 2013–14.

In 2013–14, Krishnanagar I CD Block produced 42,037 tonnes of Aman paddy, the main winter crop from 15,162 hectares, 23,789 tonnes of Boro paddy (spring crop) from 6,251 hectares, 7,457 tonnes of Aus paddy (summer crop) from 3,370 hectares, 3,940 tonnes of wheat from 1,241 hectares, 115,649 tonnes of jute from 7,069 hectares, 6,246 tonnes of potatoes from 40 hectares and 1,904 tonnes of sugar cane from 19 hectares. It also produced pulses and oilseeds.

In 2013–14, the total area irrigated in Krishnanagar I CD Block was 2,347 hectares, out of which 437 hectares were irrigated by river lift irrigation, 1,880 hectares by deep tube wells and 30 hectares by shallow tube wells.

=== Banking ===
In 2013–14, Krishnanagar I CD Block had offices of 8 commercial banks and 6 gramin banks.

== Transport ==
Krihnanagar I CD Block has 2 ferry services and 4 originating/ terminating bus services.

The Ranaghat-Lalgola branch line was opened in 1905. It passes through this CD Block and there are stations at Bahadurpur and Dhubulia.

NH 14, SH 3 running from Krishnanagar (in Nadia district) to Gosaba (in South 24 Pargananas district) and SH 8, running from Majhdia (in Nadia district) to Santaldih (in Purulia district) pass through this block.

== Education ==
In 2013–14, Krishnanagar I CD Block had 177 primary schools with 12,937 students, 13 middle schools with 1,678 students, 5 high school with 4,602 students and 18 higher secondary schools with 26,967 students. Krishnanagar I CD Block had 1 general college with 1,212 students, 5 technical/ professional institutions with 624 students and 604 institutions for special and non-formal education with 17,119 students

In Krishnanagar CD Block, amongst the 87 inhabited villages, 4 villages did not have any school, 52 had more than 1 primary school, 35 had at least 1 primary and 1 middle school and 16 had at least 1 middle and 1 secondary school.

Asannagar Madan Mohan Tarkalankar College was established at Asannagar in 2007. Affiliated to the University of Kalyani, it offers honours courses in Bengali, English, Sanskrit and history.

== Healthcare ==
In 2014, Krishnanagar I CD Block had 1 block primary health centre, 2 primary health centres and 1 private nursing home with total 50 beds and 4 doctors (excluding private bodies). It had 29 family welfare subcentres. 4,118 patients were treated indoor and 140,199 patients were treated outdoor in the hospitals, health centres and subcentres of the CD Block.

Bishnupur Rural Hospital, with 30 beds at Bishnupur, is the major government medical facility in the Krishnanagr I CD block. There are primary health centres at Asannagar (with 10 beds) and Bhaluka (with 6 beds).

Krishnanagar I CD Block is one of the areas of Nadia district where ground water is affected by moderate level of arsenic contamination. The WHO guideline for arsenic in drinking water is 10 mg/ litre, and the Indian Standard value is 50 mg/ litre. All the 17 blocks of Nadia district have arsenic contamination above this level. The maximum concentration in Krishnanagar I CD Block is 229 mg/litre.
