= Krishnanagar, Nadia =

Krishnanagar Krishnagar Reui
- City
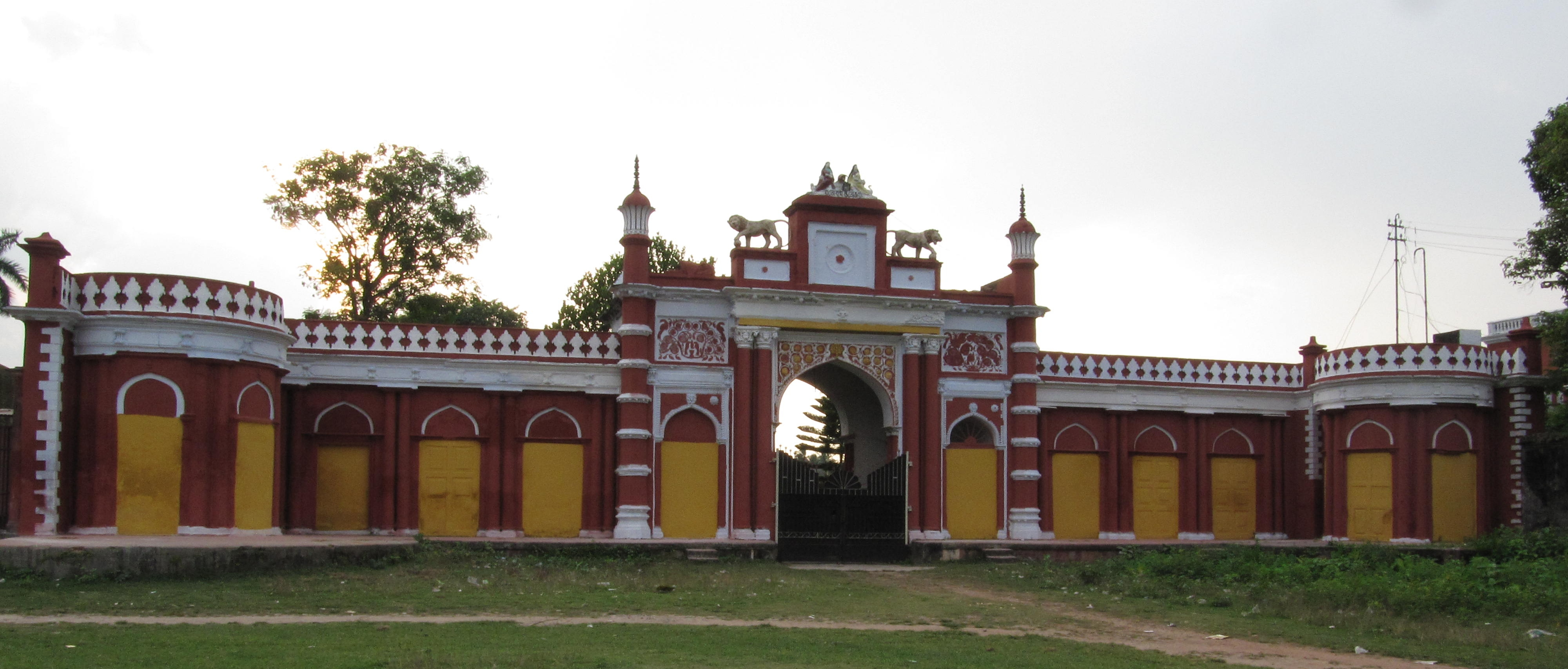
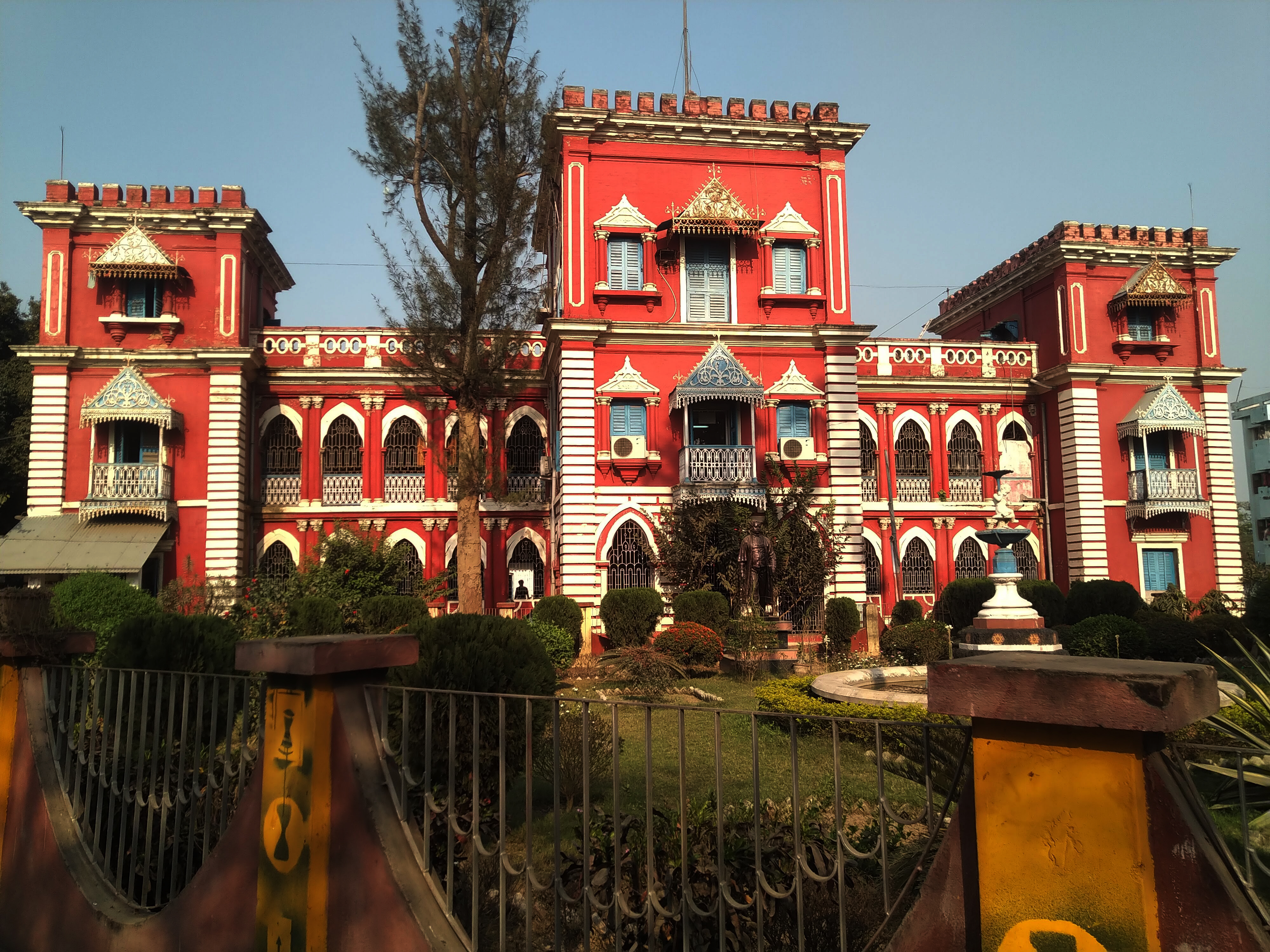
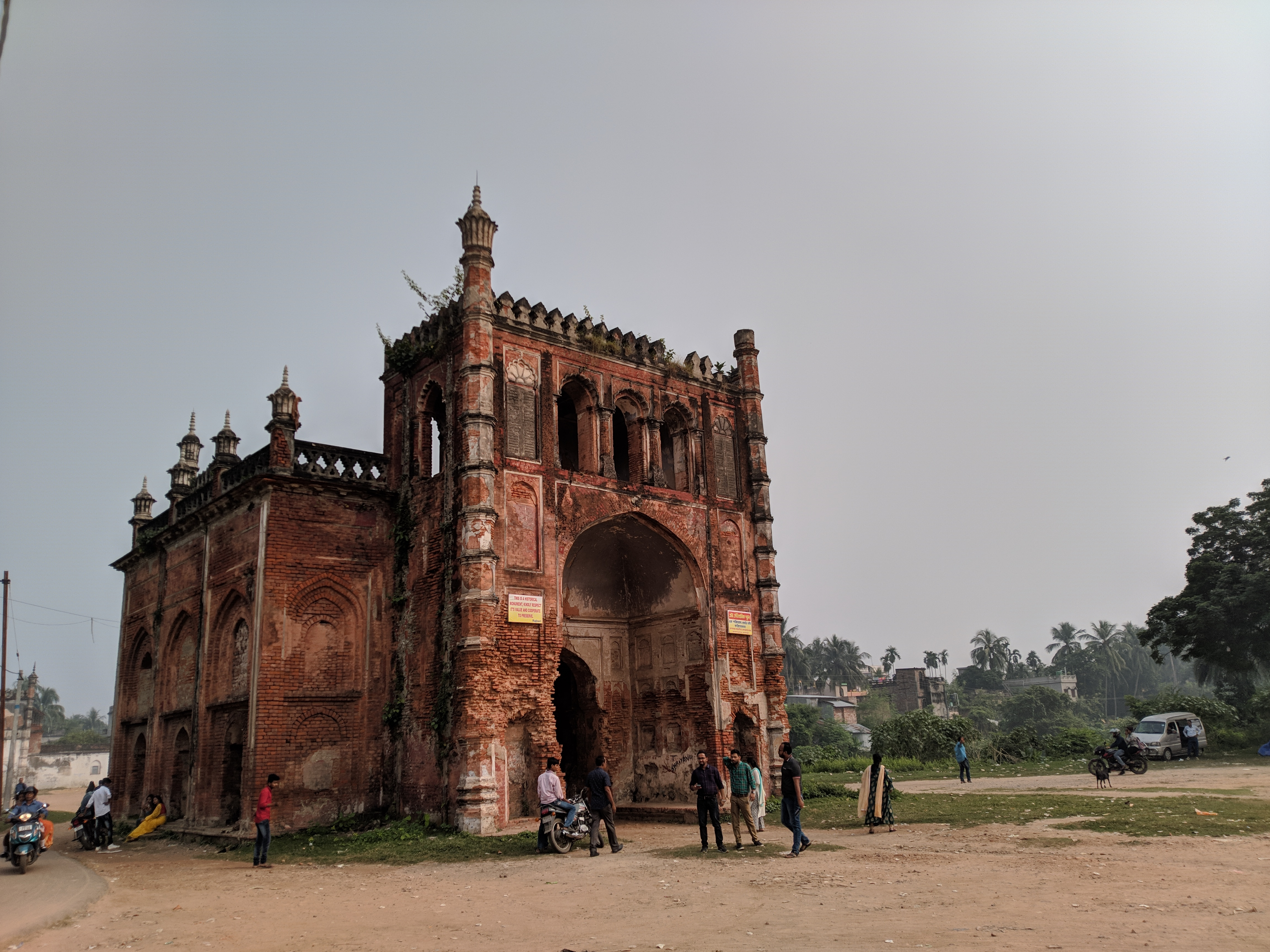
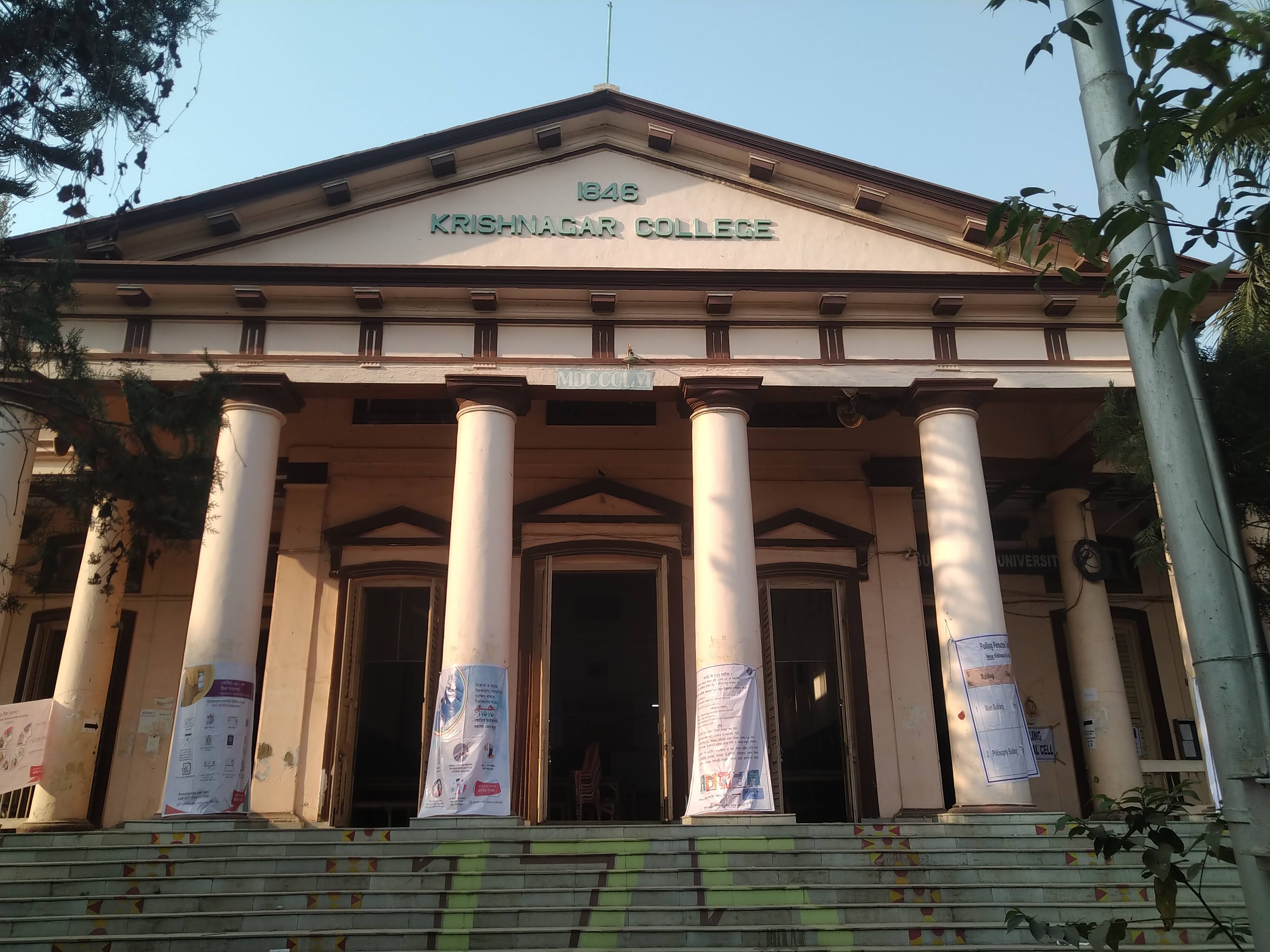
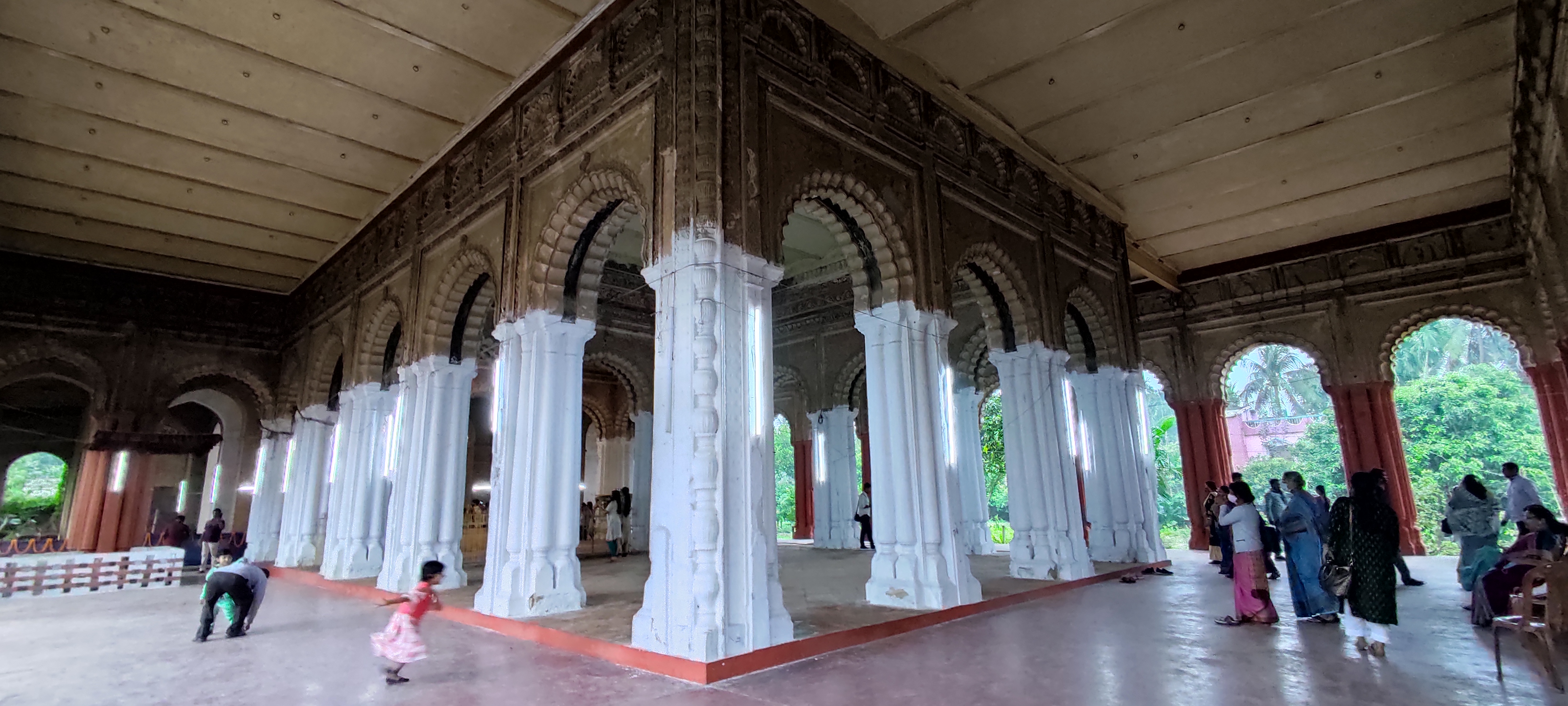
- Krishnanagar Palace Krishnagar Collegiate School Old Gate of the Krishnanagar Rajbari Krishnagar Government College Krishnanagar Rajbari Thakur Dalan

- Location in West Bengal, India Krishnanagar (India)
- Coordinates: 23.4°N 88.5°E
- Country: India
- State: West Bengal
- District: Nadia

Government
  - Type: Municipality
  - Body: Krishnanagar Municipality

Area
  - City: 15.96 km^{2} (6.16 sq mi)
- Elevation: 14 m (46 ft)

Population (2011)
  - City: 181,182
  - Density: 11,350/km^{2} (29,400/sq mi)
  - Metro: 203,429

Languages
  - Official: Bengali, English
- Time zone: UTC+5:30 (IST)
- ZIP code(s): 741101 to 741103
- Area code: 03472
- Vehicle registration: WB-51, WB-52
- Lok Sabha constituency: Krishnanagar
- Member of Legislative Assembly: Tarak Nath Chatterjee; Sadhan Ghosh
- Member of Parliament: Mahua Moitra
- Vidhan Sabha constituency: Krishnanagar North; Krishnanagar South
- Website: nadia.nic.in

Krishnanagar (/ˌkrɪʃnəˈnʌɡər/; Bengali pronunciation: [kriʃnonɔgor]) is a city and a municipality in the Indian state of West Bengal. It is the headquarters of the Nadia district.

== History ==
Krishnanagar municipality was established in 1864 and is one of the oldest municipalities in Bengal. It is claimed to be named after Krishna Chandra Roy (1728–1782). Previously, the city (village) was called 'Reui' (রেউই). The Rajbari built here during Roy's reign is a prominent tourist attraction, though the remnants of past glory have been eroded and only a dilapidated structure of the exquisite places with carvings on inner walls remain today.

== Geography ==
Krishnanagar is located at 23.4°N 88.5°E. The area of the municipality is around 16 km^{2}. It is situated on the southern banks of the Jalangi River. It has an average elevation of 14 metres (46 ft). The Tropic of Cancer passes through the outskirts of Krishnanagar. The latitude of the Tropic of Cancer is 23° 26′ 5″ N.

=== Climate ===
In summer, from April to June, the weather remains hot and temperatures range from a minimum of 26 °C (79 °F) to a maximum of 35 °C (95 °F).

Monsoon season prevails, beginning from June to mid-September. Also, retrieving monsoon from mid-October until mid-November

The weather is quite pleasant in winter, with a scorching summer. The level of moisture increases during summers.

Climate data for Krishnanagar (1991–2020, extremes 1885–2020)
Month	Jan	Feb	Mar	Apr	May	Jun	Jul	Aug	Sep	Oct	Nov	Dec	Year
Record high °C (°F)	36.8 (98.2)	38.8 (101.8)	42.2 (108.0)	45.0 (113.0)	46.1 (115.0)	45.5 (113.9)	43.0 (109.4)	43.0 (109.4)	38.5 (101.3)	38.2 (100.8)	38.0 (100.4)	36.0 (96.8)	46.1 (115.0)
Mean daily maximum °C (°F)	25.0 (77.0)	28.6 (83.5)	32.7 (90.9)	35.8 (96.4)	36.5 (97.7)	35.4 (95.7)	33.1 (91.6)	33.2 (91.8)	33.2 (91.8)	32.4 (90.3)	30.1 (86.2)	26.8 (80.2)	31.7 (89.1)
Mean daily minimum °C (°F)	11.4 (52.5)	15.5 (59.9)	19.1 (66.4)	23.5 (74.3)	24.6 (76.3)	25.5 (77.9)	25.7 (78.3)	25.7 (78.3)	24.9 (76.8)	23.2 (73.8)	17.8 (64.0)	13.2 (55.8)	20.6 (69.1)
Record low °C (°F)	0.9 (33.6)	3.9 (39.0)	7.5 (45.5)	13.5 (56.3)	15.5 (59.9)	16.0 (60.8)	12.0 (53.6)	14.0 (57.2)	16.0 (60.8)	12.0 (53.6)	7.0 (44.6)	4.4 (39.9)	0.9 (33.6)
Average rainfall mm (inches)	6.7 (0.26)	20.2 (0.80)	20.2 (0.80)	31.5 (1.24)	96.3 (3.79)	170.5 (6.71)	261.6 (10.30)	175.2 (6.90)	218.5 (8.60)	112.5 (4.43)	10.2 (0.40)	6.8 (0.27)	1,130 (44.49)
Average rainy days	0.9	1.0	1.5	2.0	4.9	8.6	13.2	9.9	9.5	5.1	0.8	0.2	57.6
Average relative humidity (%) (at 17:30 IST)	65	61	62	64	66	75	79	80	78	77	73	72	71
Source: India Meteorological Department

== Demographics ==
In the 2011 Indian census, Krishnanagar city had a population of 181,182, with 91,583 males and 89,599 females. It is at the centre of a bigger urban agglomeration which as of the 2011 census, had a population of 203,429. The urban agglomeration had a sex ratio of 978 females per 1,000 males. The child sex ratio is 926 girls per 1,000 boys. 7.5% of the population were under six years old. The effective literacy rate was 88.09%, of which male and female literacy was 90.84% and 85.29%, respectively.

The following municipality and census towns were part of Krishnanagar Urban Agglomeration in 2011 census: Krishnanagar (M), Baruihuda (CT), Paschimbhatjangla (CT) and Sonda.

Religions in Krishnanagar
Religion	Percent
Hinduism	90.82%
Christianity	6.07%
Islam	2.98%
Others†	0.15%
Distribution of religions †Includes Sikhs (0.04%), Buddhists (0.02%) and Jains (0.01%).

Languages spoken in Krishnanagar City (2011)
1. Bengali (97.5%)
2. Hindi (2.02%)
3. Santali (0.15%)
4. Bhojpuri (0.11%)
5. Malayalam (0.05%)
6. Others (0.18%)

== Administration ==
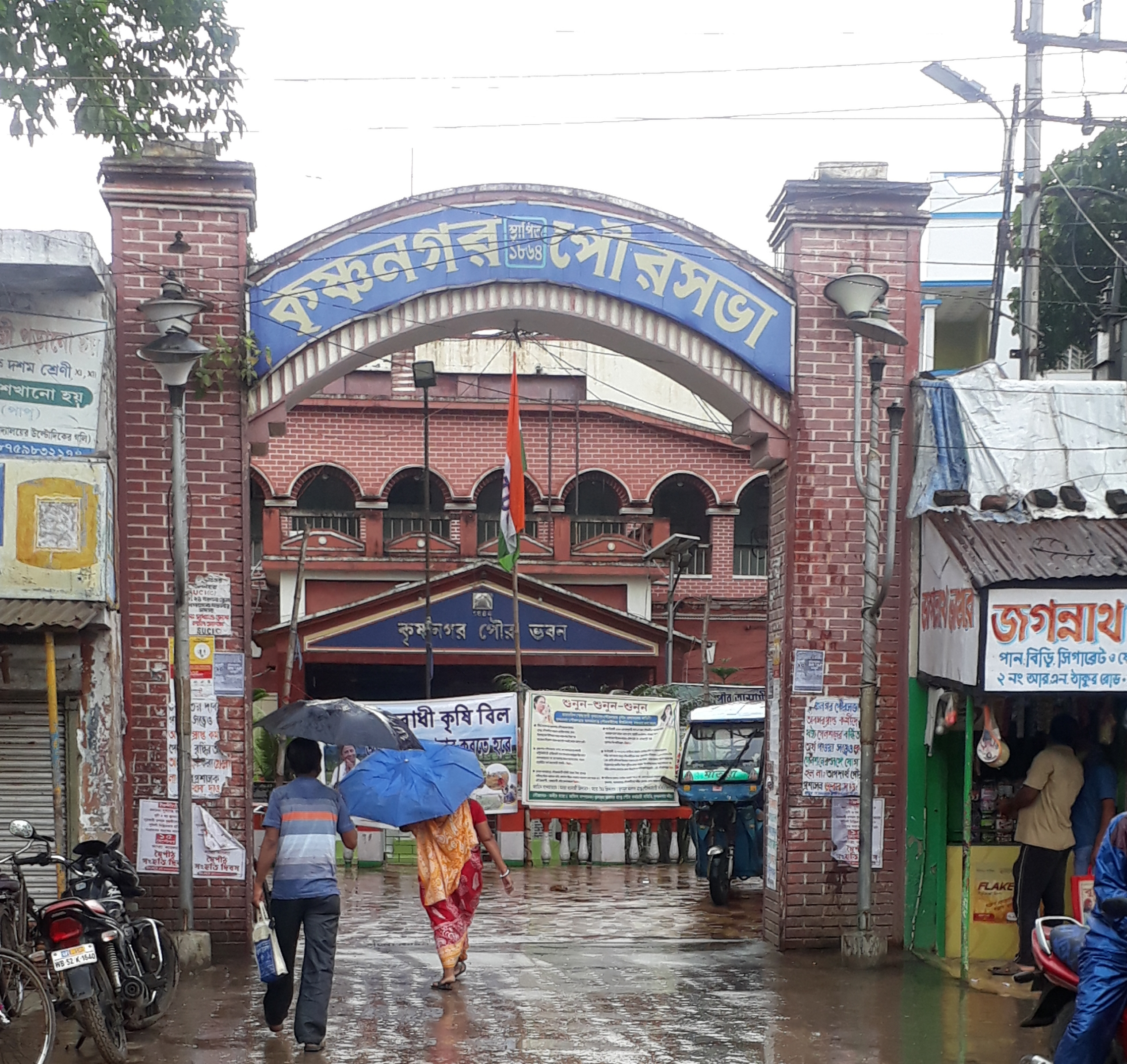
Krishnanagar Municipality front entrance

Krishnanagar city is governed by Krishnanagar Municipality, which comes under Krishnanagar Municipal Region. The area of the municipality is divided into 25 wards with 25 councillors. Krishnanagar is the administrative headquarters of Nadia district. Krishnanagar is the centre for all administration purposes. The parties which contest for the elections are Trinomool Congress, Indian National Congress, BJP, and CPIM. The board of councillors elect a chairman from among its elected members; the chairman is the executive head of the municipality. The elected members of this body are authorised to manage education, health, tourism, and the overall development of the area.

=== Medical Facilities ===
As Krishnanagar is the headquarter of Nadia District, it gets some of the added facilities. Apart from Government Hospitals, there are private-run nursing home as well.

=== Water ===
As Krishnanagar is city just beside the Jalangi River (Tributary of River Ganges), one can also avail water transport. Regular boat transport is also available from Krishnanagar to other parts.

=== Police stations ===
Kotwali Police Station (also known as Krishnanagar PS) has jurisdiction over Krishnanagar municipality and Krishnanagar I CD Block. The total area covered by the police station is 289.15 km^{2} and the population covered is 456,969 (2001 census).

Women Police Station was established in 2012.

== Transport ==
Krishnanagar is 100 kilometres (62 mi) north of Kolkata. Being the district headquarters, residents of Krishnanagar enjoy some unique facilities as far as transport is concerned: wide roads, intracity connectivity by auto rickshaws, cycle rickshaws, E-rickshaws, service buses, and magic taxis (aka Toto). Express buses are available for places like Kolkata, Malda, Siliguri, Berhampore, Howrah, Purulia, Asansol, Durgapur, Bolpur, Kirnahar, Suri, Tarakeswar etc. from the city's Bus Stand or PWD stand very close to NH 12. The nearest airports are Netaji Subhash Chandra Bose International Airport, which is 98 kilometres (61 mi) by road, and Kazi Nazrul Airport, which is 176 kilometres (109 miles) by road.

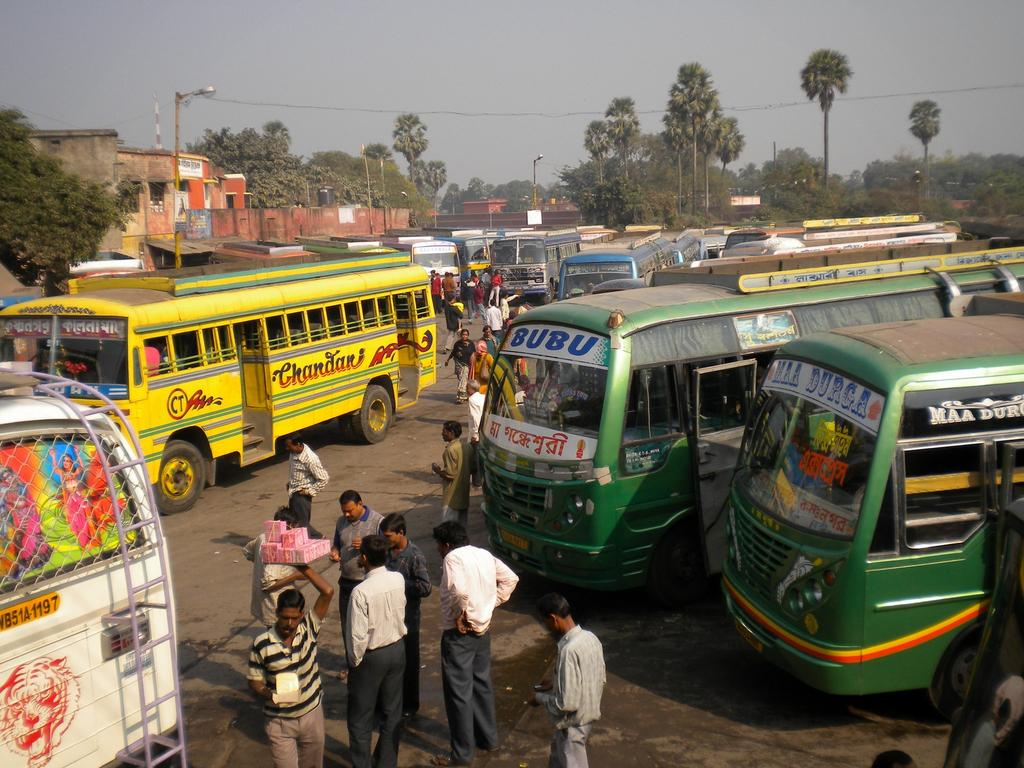
Bus Stand

=== Road ===
NH 12 passes through Krishnanagar. As Krishnanagar is the administrative headquarters of the Nadia district, it acts as the link between North Bengal and South Bengal. There are bus services on a regular basis from South Bengal to North Bengal and vice versa. All buses that start from Kolkata to North Bengal halt at Krishnanagar (Pantha Tirtha/Church Gate/Palpara). Krishnanagar has a main bus stand at the centre of the city, which is a destination of various long, mid-and short-distance places. It is connected directly to Kolkata, Siliguri Bardhaman, Durgapur, Tarakeswar, Siuri, and Asansol by road. Locally, it is connected to Ranaghat, Kolkata, Santipur, Mayapur, and Nabadwip. Krishnanagar is connected with Shikarpur (Route no 1), Patrikabari Ghat (Route no 2A) (via state highway 11), Hridaypur (Route no 4), Ranabandh Ghat (Route no 5), Nabadwip (Route no 8), Ranaghat (Route no 9, 17, 17B), Kalna Ghat (Route no 18), Patuli Ghat (Route no 25), Matiari (Route no 29), Bablari (Route no 30A), Tehatta Ghat (Route no 37), Palashi Monument (Route no 39) and Nonaganj (Route no 41). Krishnanagar is also connected with other places such as Karimpur, Khalboalia, Majdia, Birpur Ghat, Hular Ghat, Katwa Ghat, Hatisala Ghat, Ichapur Ghat, Sibpur Ghat, and Shimulia.

=== Rail ===
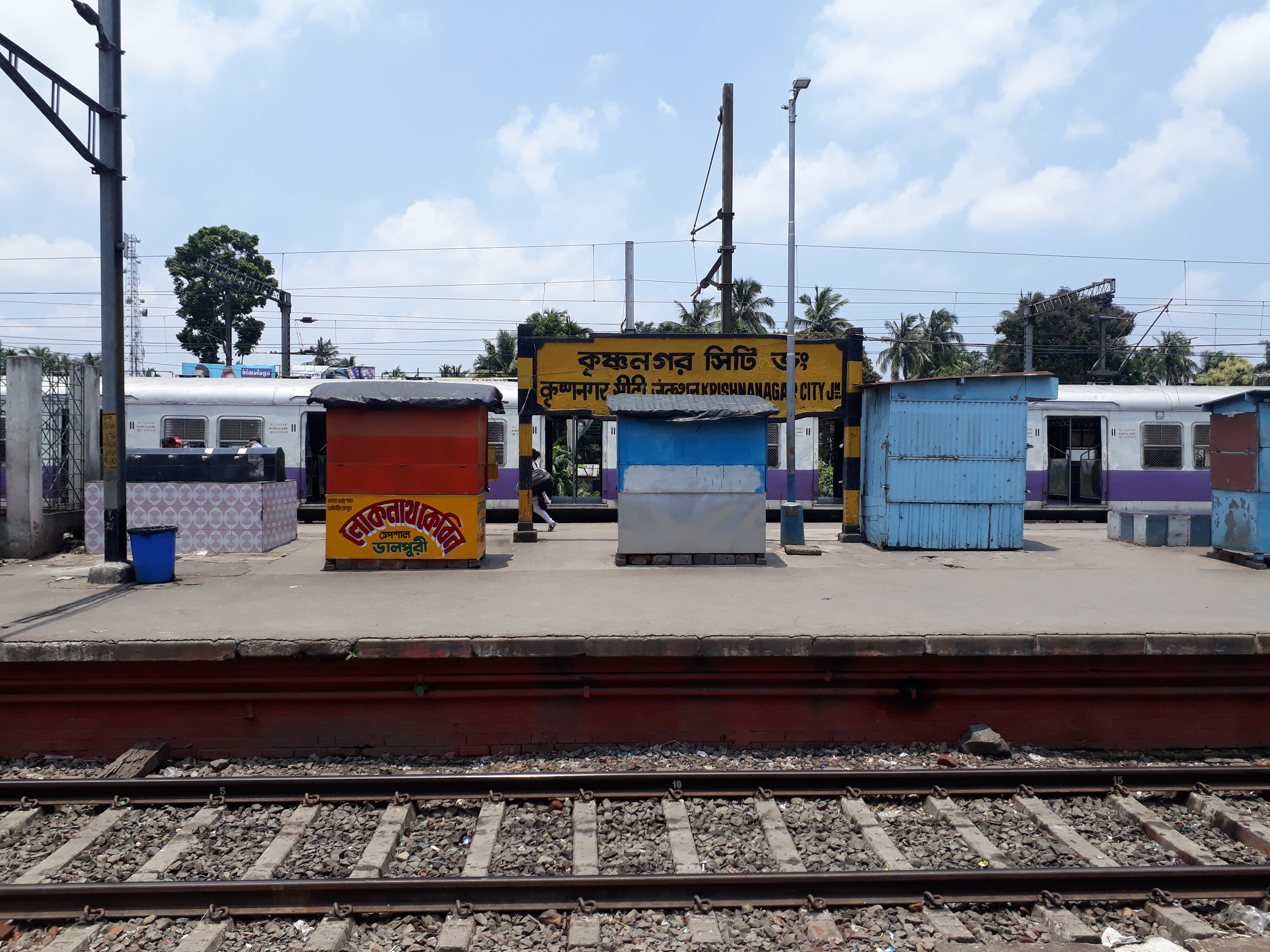
Krishnanagar City Junction railway station

Krishnanagar City Junction railway station is a junction on the Lalgola branch line of the Eastern Railway. Local EMU trains are the most convenient option to reach Kolkata.

All trains going to or coming from Lalgola stop at Krishnanagar. MEMU trains depart from Ranaghat heading for Bahrampur and vice versa stops at Krishnanagar.

EMU (Broad gauge local) train service between Santipur and Krishnanagar started, and has been extended to Amghata Halt after gauge conversion of Shantipur - Krishnanagar - Nabadwip Ghat NG Railway. This route may be extended to Nabadwip Ghat and/or Nabadwip Dham, hich is an ongoing matter of debate. Although 13103/13104 Sealdah-Lalgola Bhagirathi Express, 13113/13114 Kolkata - Lalgola Hazarduari Express, Lalgola Fast Passenger and a few Lalgola Passenger are the trains that run daily. 13117 / 13118 Kolkata - Lalgola Dhano Dhanye Express runs 4 days a week. Ladies special (Matribhumi local) from Krishnanagar to Sealdah runs every day. In 2025, AC EMU services were inaugurated between Sealdah and Krishnanagar City Junction.

This station alongwith the route became more important after the railway connection between the two banks of Bhagirathi river was established via Nashipur Rail Bridge in 2024. Passenger train between KNJ and Azimganj (AZ) is operational from 2024. In an attempt to establish direct rail connection to North Bengal and Northeast India from Kolkata, through the east bank of Bhagirathi River, 13115/13116 Sealdah-Jalpaiguri Road Humsafar Express and 13125/13126 Kolkata–Sairang Express were inaugurated in 2025. Krishnanagar is one of the important stoppages for these two trains.

== Culture ==
Krishnanagar is an important centre for culture and literature. It counts literary figures such as Ray Gunakor Bharatchandra, Ramprasad Sen, Dwijendralal Ray and Narayan Sanyal among many others. There is also a strong tradition of stage acting and Indian revolutionary movements. Several elegant pieces of handicraft arts can also be found in this region, namely the handicraft in making of carpet, bamboo and jute crafts, miniature paintings. a horticultural research station and jute nursery, and an agricultural training centre.

Jagaddhatri Puja is celebrated with grandeur in Krishnanagar, the illumination for Jagaddhatri Puja is mostly crafted by local artisans, with only occasional use of Chandannagar lights. The origins of Jagaddhatri Puja in Krishnanagar can be traced back to the 18th century, when it was first celebrated by Maharaja Krishna Chandra, the king of Krishnanagar. Initiated by Krishna Chandra in 1762, is the crowning glory of the annual festival. The Maharaja's absence from the Durga Puja that year left him heartbroken as he could not offer his prayers to Maa Durga. Returning by boat on Dasami, the day of idol immersion, the Maharaja saw the idols being immersed in the river and was overcome with grief. However, in a dream that night, he saw a teenage Goddess seated on a lion, resembling a white horse, assuring him that she would come to him on the Sukla Nabami tithi in the Bengali month of Kartick (October–November). Following her divine instructions, an idol of Goddess Jagaddhatri was sculpted and the puja was performed with great pomp and splendor. Jagaddhatri Puja is celebrated across the local clubs & Barowari's of Krishnanagar, with each of them have its own unique customs and traditions. They are essentially different neighborhoods or communities within the town, each with its own distinct identity and character. The most prominent of them all is Chasapara Barowari Puja where the deity is called Burima. This festival that has been celebrated for over 100 years, is known for its grandeur and splendor. The festival is organized by the Chasapara Barowari Committee, and it is celebrated with great enthusiasm and devotion by the locals. The festival is known for its magnificent pandal decorations, which are designed based on various themes and concepts. The pandals are adorned with colorful lights, flowers, and other decorative items, making them a visual treat for the visitors. During the Puja, the locals also perform a unique ritual called "chokkhudaan" where they offer their eyes to the Goddess in the form of a symbolic gesture. This ritual is believed to signify the devotee's willingness to see the truth and the divine light. The festival is also known for its colorful processions, which are accompanied by the beats of the dhak, a traditional Indian percussion instrument. One of the notable features of this Chasapara Barowari is the heavily adornment of Burima with gold jewellery. It is believed that Burima fulfills her true devotees wishes.

Krishnanagar is also famous for its Barodol Mela. Maharaja Krishnachandra, a devoted husband, once failed to fulfill his promise of taking his beloved queen to the neighboring fair at Ula Birnagar. To make up for it, he organized a grand festival in his own palace where 12 idols of Krishna were invited for a month-long stay. The tradition continues to this day, with the royal household playing a vital role in the festival's success, even though its splendor has faded somewhat over time.The festival is normally held after the Dolyatra in the Sukla Ekadashi tithi. It begins with the arrival of 12 idols of Krishna, each representing a different form of the deity. The idols are displayed for public viewing for the first three days of the festival, after which they retire to a temple inside the palace as guests of the patron deity Boro Narayan. Meanwhile, the month-long fair takes place in the vast field next to the old fort's gate, open to all who wish to participate. The fairgrounds are alive with the sounds of vendors hawking their wares, performers entertaining the crowds, and children laughing and screaming in delight as they ride the rides. The fair also provides a platform for local artisans to showcase their skills and sell their wares. From the clay toy makers to the handloom weavers, the fair is an opportunity for these artisans to display their products to a wider audience and earn a living.

== Places of interest ==
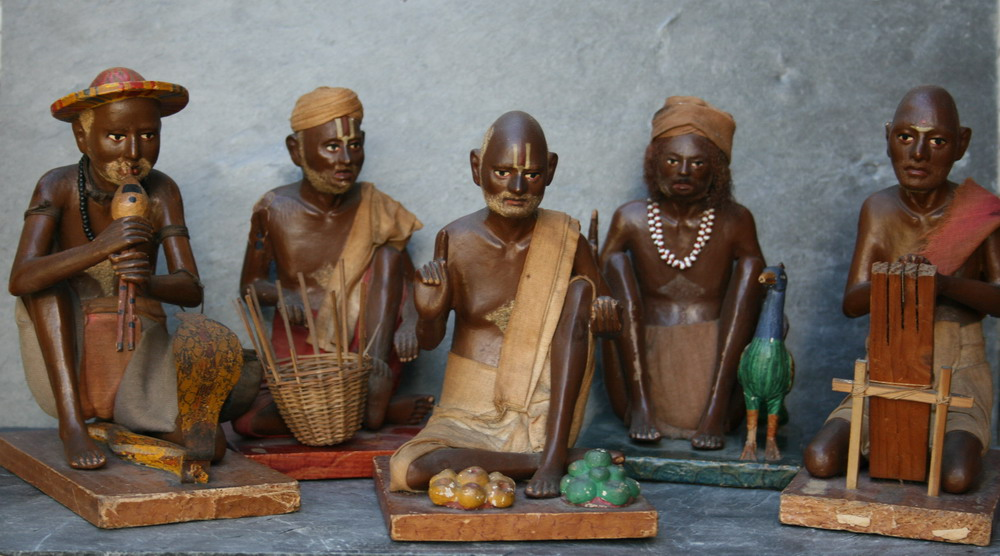
A piece of work at ghurni

=== Ghurni ===
The famous area called Ghurni is the birthplace of Yogiraj Sri Shyama Charan Lahiri Mahasaya, fountain-head of Kriya Yoga. Ghurni is the neighbourhood of the clay artists. Open studios and shops of the artists comprise an important attraction for tourists.

=== Rajbari ===
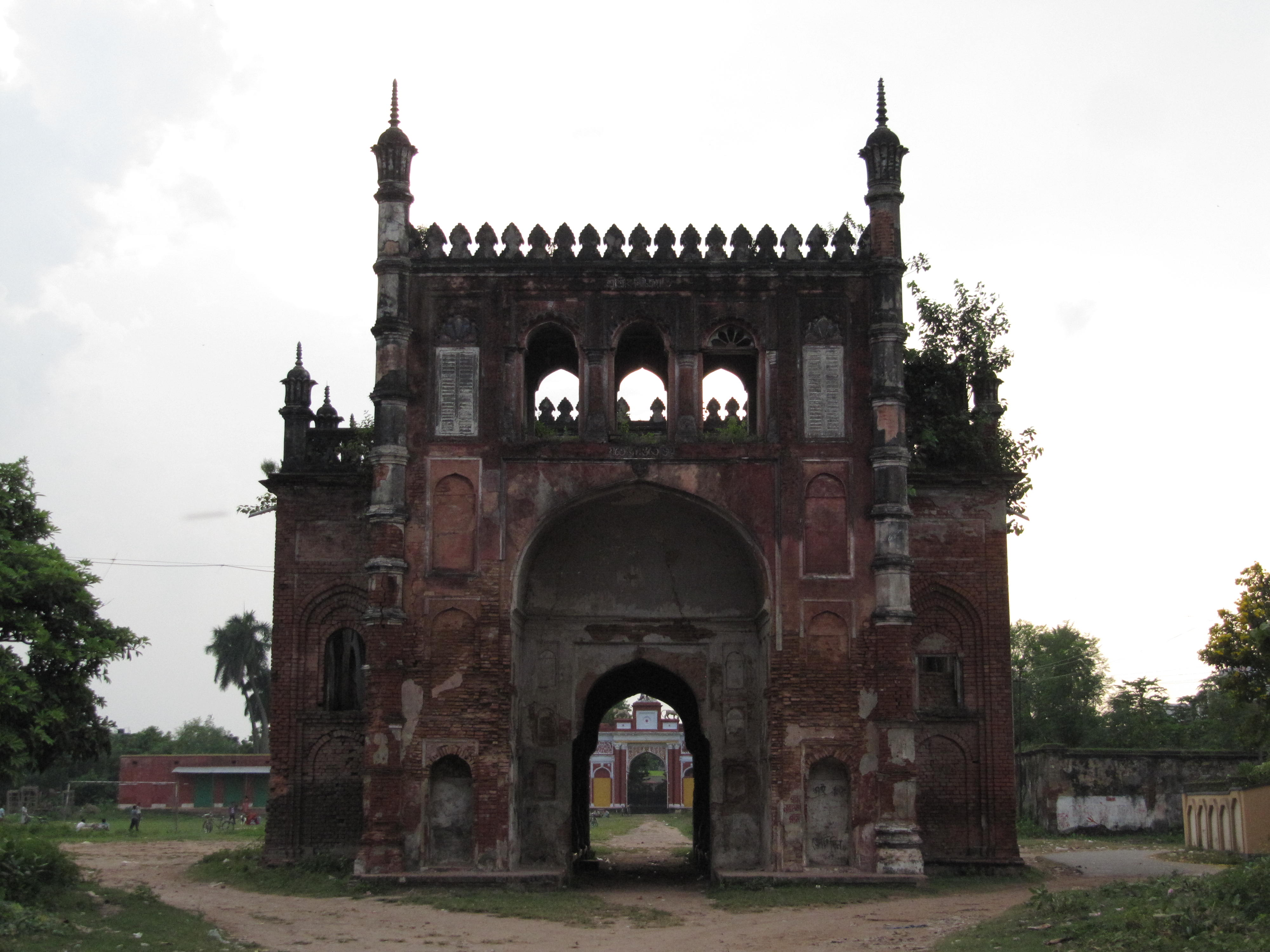
Entrance of Royal Palace

Rajbari, also known as the Krishnanagar Palace, is a royal palace with a Durga temple in the courtyard. The Durga puja was started by Raja Rudra Roy, the great-grandfather of Raja Krishnachandra Roy. Every year, Jhulan Mela is celebrated around the Rajbari in July–August and Baro Dol (as it is held 12 days after Dol Purnima) in March–April every year. Rajbari is mostly visited for the celebration of different festivals. These include the popular Jhulan Mela and the festival of colours Holi or Baro Dol. The historical monument surrounded by a water-body known as Dighi has a beautiful Goddess Durga temple erected in its central courtyard.

=== Bethuadahari Forest ===
Bethuadahari Forest, a forest covering about 67 hectares, is located at Bethuadahari which is situated about 22 km from Krishnanagar. This forest is an extended deer park. The forest was established in 1980 to preserve the biodiversity of the central Gangetic alluvial zone. A census of 1998 reveals a population of 295 deer in this forest and other wildlife includes python, jungle cat, porcupine, monitor lizard, snake, and a variety of birds (around 50 species).

Bahadurpur Forest situated by the side of NH 34 in Krishnanagar II Block has been chosen as a prospective spot for jungle safari. Hasadanga Beel, adjacent to Bahadurpur Forest, is a vast waterbody which can be transformed into a water sports complex. This beel has the potential to be developed as a safe haven for seasonal migratory birds.

== Notable people ==
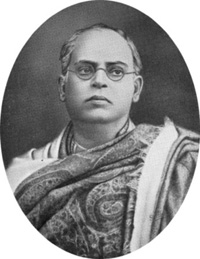
Dwijendralal Roy

- Dwijendralal Ray (1863–1913), Indian poet, playwright, and lyricist, was born in Krishnanagar.
- Ramtanu Lahiri (1813–1898), Bengal leader, teacher, and social reformer.
- Jagadananda Roy (1869–1933), a scientific article writer

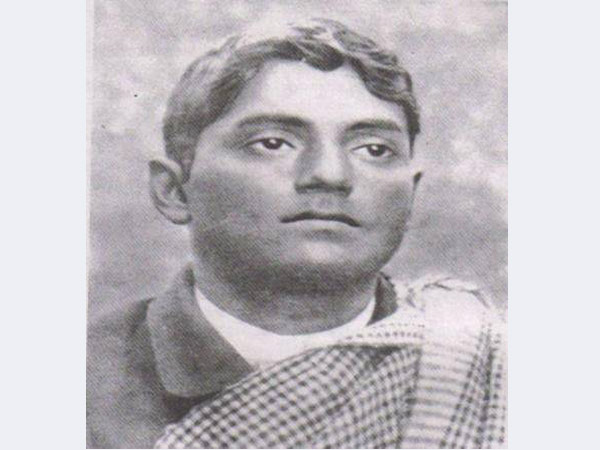
Bagha Jatin

- Bagha Jatin (born Jatindranath Mukherjee) (7 December 1879 – 10 September 1915) was an Indian Bengali revolutionary philosopher against British rule.
- Sudhir Chakravarti (1934–2020) was a Bengali educationist and essayist.
- Soumitra Chattopadhyay (1935–2020) was an Indian film and stage actor and poet.
- Kazi Nazrul Islam, the poet stayed at Grace Cottage, Krishnanagar between 1926 and 1928.
- Bijoy Lal Chattopadhyay, nationalist poet
- Narayan Sanyal
- Hemanta Kumar Sarkar
- Haripada Chattopadhyay
- Dilip Kumar Roy
- Lahiri Mahasaya
- Subhash Mukhopadhyay
- Charles Gmelin (First British Olympic Games award-winning athlete) were born in this city.
- Pramod Ranjan Sengupta, Socialist revolutionary and member of the Indian National Army
- Dr. Khudiram Das, Ram Tanu Lahiri Professor, Calcutta University
- Monomohun Ghose
- Lalmohan Ghosh
- Jagannath Majumdar
- Bina Das
- Anantahari Mitra
- Bipradas Pal Chowdhury
- Dilip Bagchi
- Abhijit Banerjee, Nobel Memorial Prize winner.
- Sudhir Chakraborty

== Educational Institutes ==
There are various Government and private run schools affiliated with the West Bengal Board of Secondary Education, WBCHSE, The Indian Council for Secondary Examination (ICSE) and the Central Board of Secondary Education (CBSE).

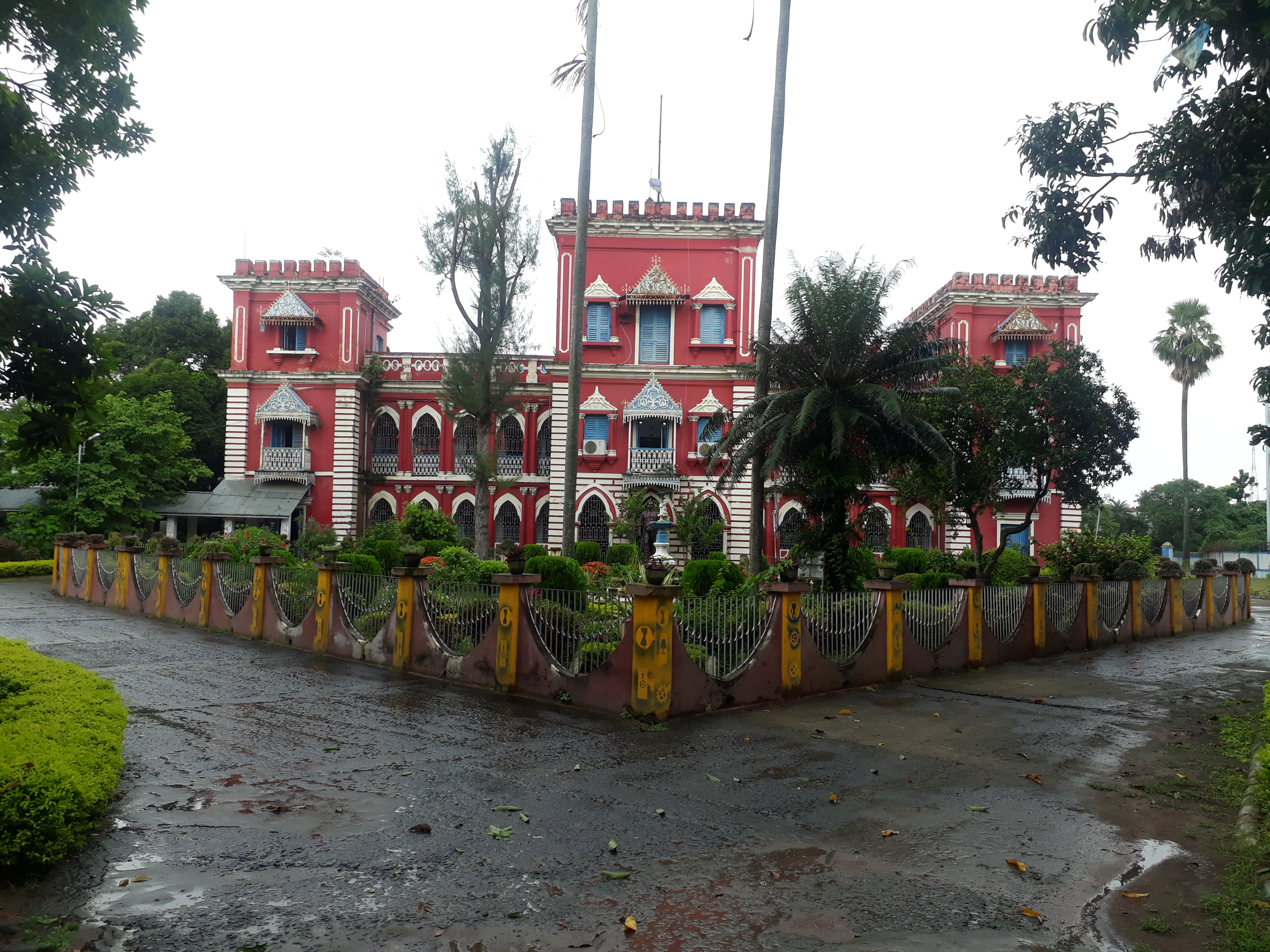
Krishnagar Collegiate School

- Krishnagar Collegiate School (1846) (the former house of barrister Monomohun Ghose)
- C.M.S St. John's High School (Oldest school in Nadia, established 1834)

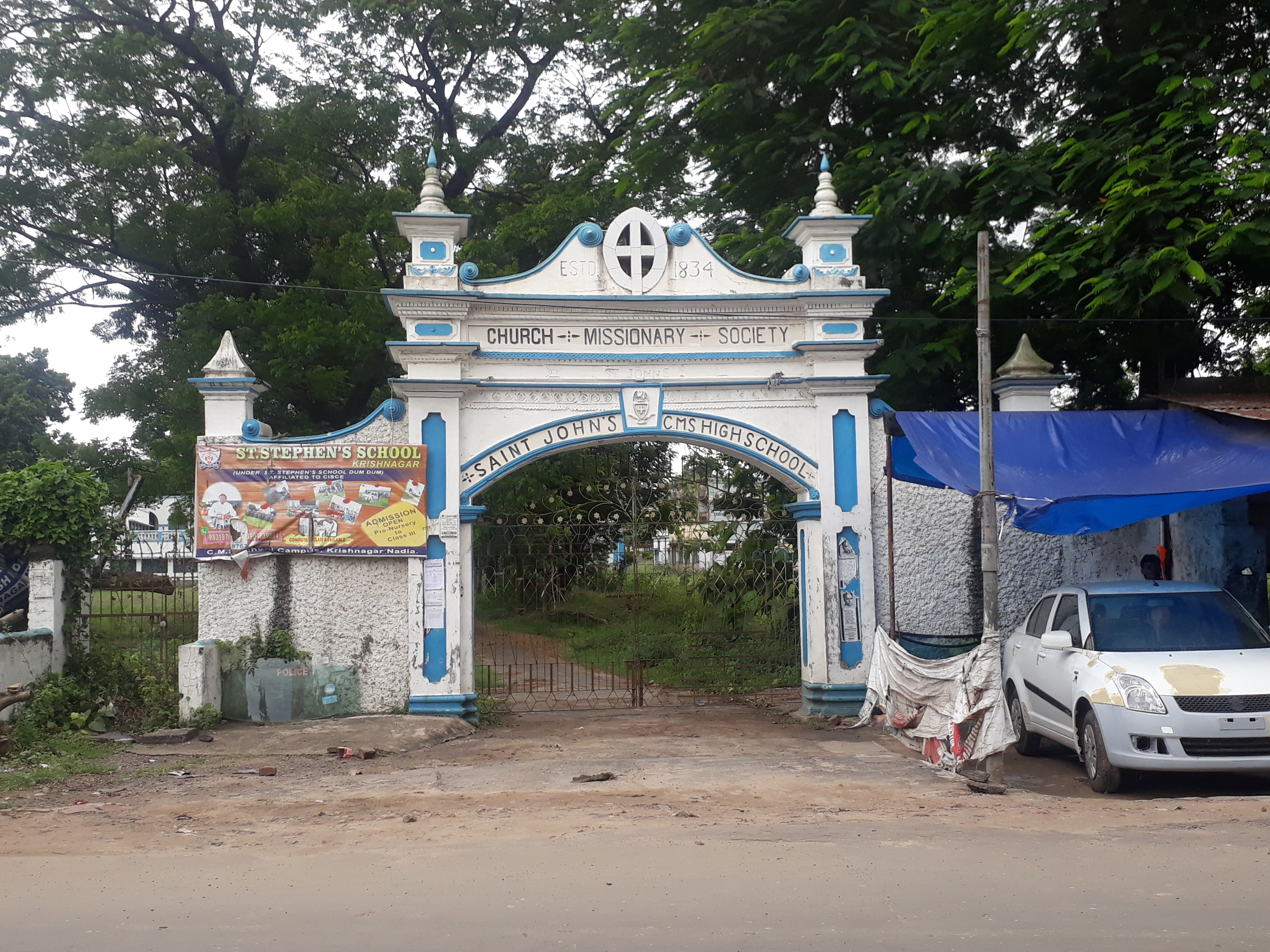
C.M.S St. John's High School

- C.E.Z Queens' Girls' High School (1840) (One of the oldest historical girls' schools in undivided India)
- Krishnanagar Debnath High School (has a rich history dating back to 1873)
- Kendriya Vidyalaya B.S.F., Krishnagar
- Krishnanagar High School
- Krishnanagar Government Girls' High School
- Krishnanagar Lady Carmichael Girls' Higher Secondary School
- Krishnanagar A.V. High School (established 1849)
- Shaktinagar High School
- Holy Family Girls School
- Kabi Vijoylal H.S. Institute
- Ram Baux Chetlangia High School
- Mrinalini Girls High School
- Swarnamayee Girls High School
- Ghurni High School
- Helen Keller Smriti Vidya Mandir
- Krishnagar Akshay Vidyapith Girls High School
- Kalinagar High School (H.S.)
- Krishnagar Anatheswar Adarsha Vidyapith (A.A.V.P.)
- Bishop Morrow School (formerly known as Mary Immaculate School)
- Krishnanagar Academy (from class 3 to class 12) also known as Ramtanu Lahiri Academy (from lower nursery to class 2)
- Krishnagar Public School (KPS)
- Don Bosco Higher Secondary School
- Jagabandhu Sishu Niketan

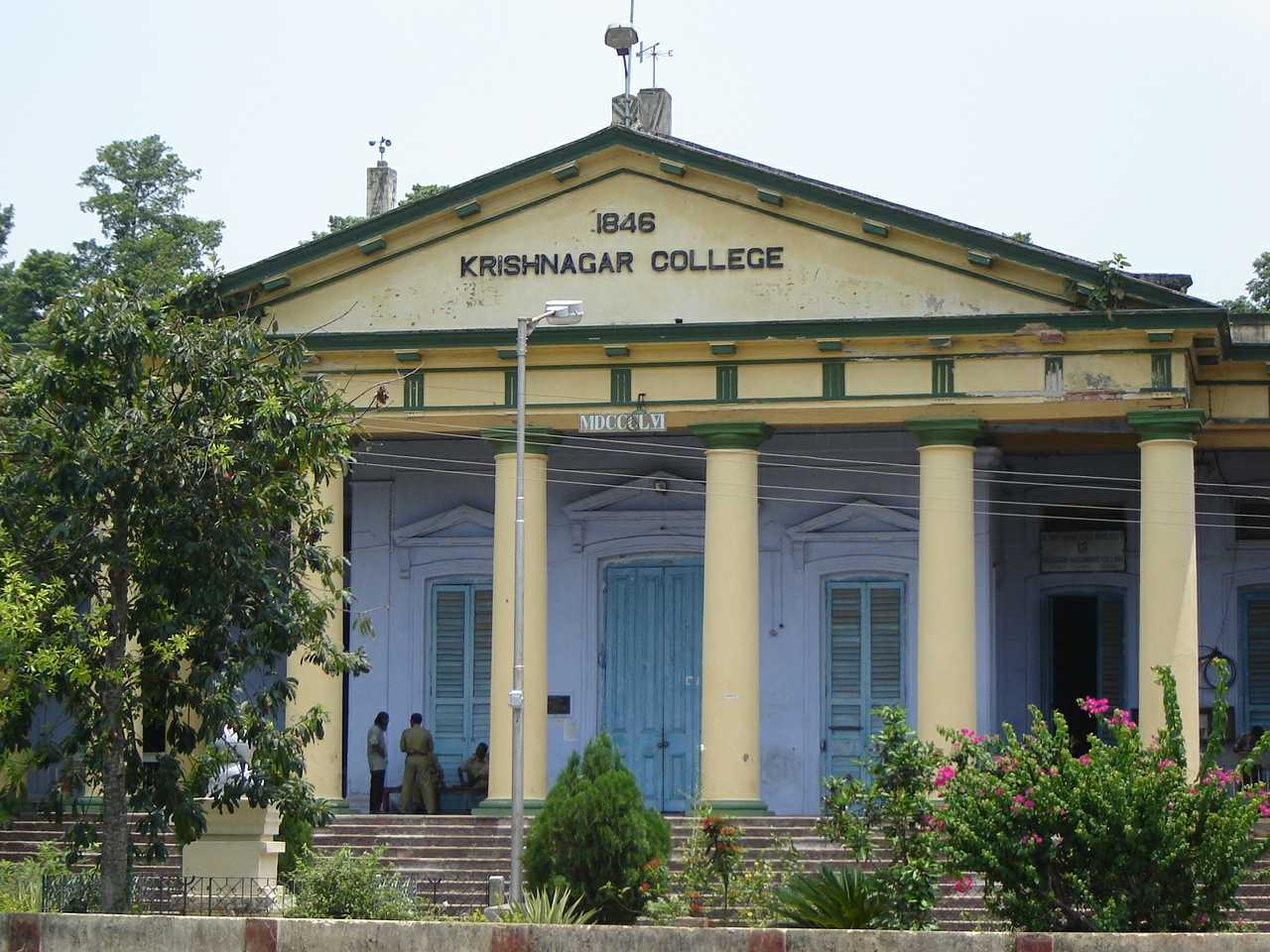
Krishnanagar Government College

=== Colleges ===
==== Government–Operated colleges ====
- Krishnagar Government College: The college building is under the Maintenance of ASI, It was established in the year 1846.
- Dwijendralal College
- Krishnanagar Women's College
- Bipradas Pal Chowdhury Institute of Technology

==== Private colleges ====
- Global Institute of Management & Technology (GIMT)
- Global College Of Science And Technology (GCST)
- Global Institute Of Education (GIE)
- Global Private Industrial Technical Institute (GPITI)
- Krishnanagar B.Ed. College.

University:

Kanyashree University (established in 2020): women-only university in Krishnanagar, Nadia.

== See also ==
- Nadia District
- Ranaghat
- Chakdaha
- Kalyani
- Chandannagar
- Basirhat
- Barasat

== Sources ==
- "Krishnagar". Archived from the original on 4 March 2016 – via Questia.
- Encyclopædia Britannica
