= Krishnagar Government College =

Undergraduate college in West Bengal, India

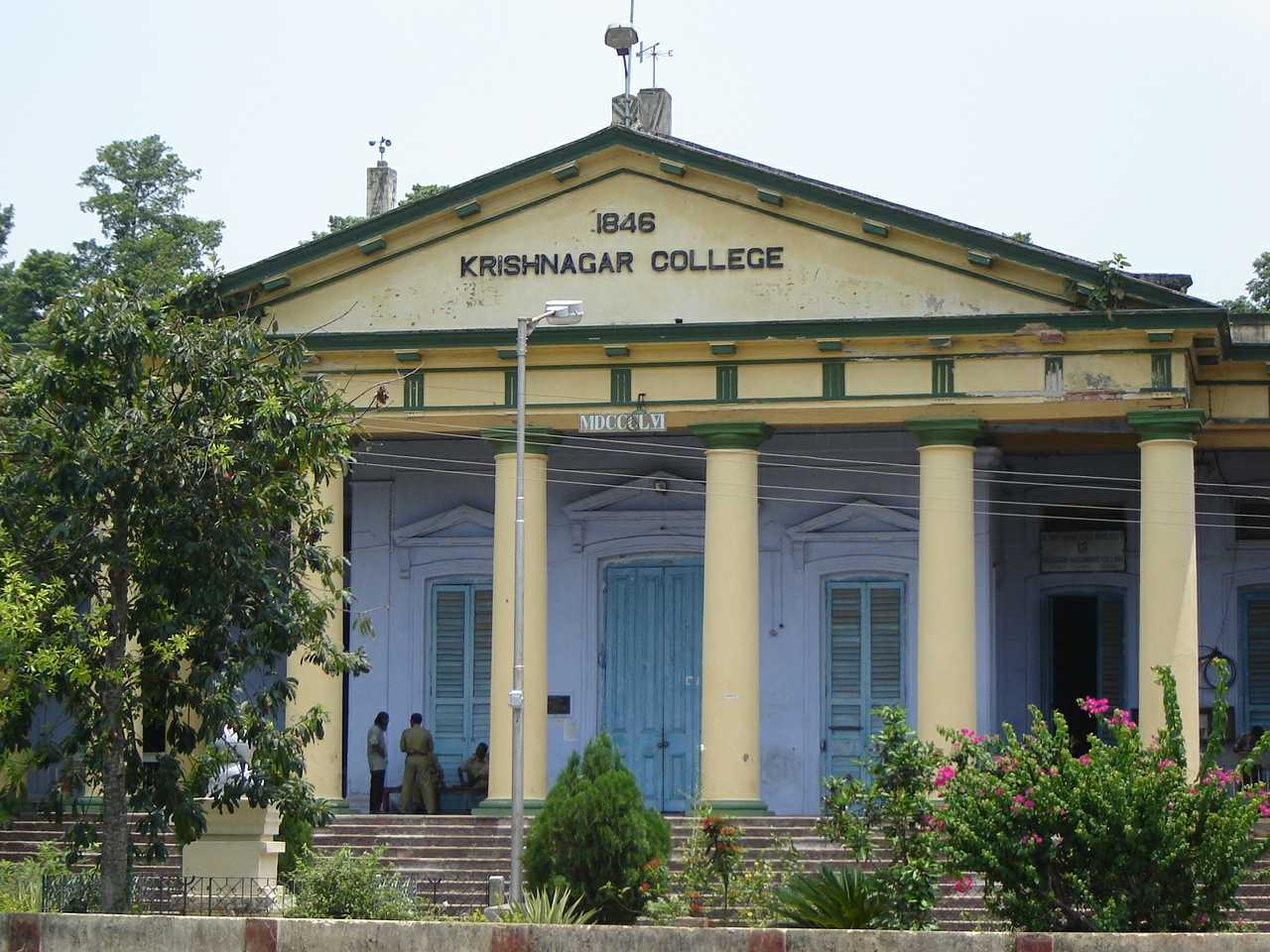
- Type: Undergraduate college, postgraduate college
- Established: 1846; 180 years ago
- Affiliations: University of Kalyani, NAAC, UGC
- Principal: Dr. Debnath Palit
- Location: College St, Nagendranagar, Krishnanagar, West Bengal, 741101, India; 23.4094802°N 88.4860539°E
- Campus: Urban
- Website: www.krishnagargovtcollege.ac.in
- Location in West Bengal Krishnagar Government College (India)

Krishnagar Government College, established in 1846, is the oldest college in Nadia district in the Indian state of West Bengal. It offers undergraduate courses in arts and sciences and also some postgraduate courses. At first, the college was under the affiliation of the University of Calcutta. Presently, it is affiliated to the University of Kalyani (KU), National Assessment and Accreditation Council (NAAC) and University Grant Commission (UGC).

== History ==
Krishnagar Government College is the oldest college of the district. In 1846 Lord Hardinge approved the establishment proposal of the college. Nadia Raj Srishchandra Roy and Maharani Swarnamoyee Devi from Cossimbazar estate donated the land for it. The palatial building was made in 1856. The first principal was David Lester Richardson, famous educationist, ex-principal of the Presidency College, Calcutta. After that Marcus Gustavus Rochfort, Loper Lethbridge, Umesh Chandra Dutta, Jyoti Bhusan Bhadury, R.N Gilcriest, Eagerton Smith, Rakhalraj Biswas, and Satish Chandra De glorified the post. Notable personalities of the national freedom struggle, activists of political and social movements, academics, and intellectuals came out from the college. Ramtanu Lahiri, Md. Abdul Hai, Bishnu Dey, Subodh Chandra Sengupta, Khudiram Das, Sudhir Chakravarti were among the notable faculty members of the college.

== Academics ==
Krishnagar Government College offers four-year undergraduate courses (according to National Education Policy 2020) in the field of arts and science along with honours, (previously, three-year UG courses under CBCS system); and two year post graduation courses. The college has 16 academic departments offering 19 major programs.

== Accreditation ==
Krishnagar Government College was awarded an A (CGPA: 3.17, 2015) grade by the National Assessment and Accreditation Council (NAAC). The college is recognized by the University Grants Commission (UGC). The college was also named a "college with potential for excellence" in 2010. The college also has a long list of alumni members.

== Notable alumni ==
- Dwijendralal Ray
- Gagan Chandra Biswas
- Monomohun Ghose
- Lalmohan Ghosh
- Nihar Ranjan Gupta
- Anil Biswas
- Pramatha Nath Bose
- Dinendra Kumar Roy
- Narayan Sanyal
- Sudhir Chakravarti
- Hemanta Kumar Sarkar
- Pramod Ranjan Sengupta
- Satish Chandra Vidyabhusan
- Dilip Bagchi
- Nawajesh Ahmed

== Notable staff ==
- Khan Bahadur Abdul Hakim CIE, mathematics (1905–1985)

== See also ==
- List of institutions of higher education in West Bengal
- Education in India
- Education in West Bengal
- Krishnagar Women's College
