= Sudhir Chakraborty =

Bengali writer (1934–2020)

Sudhir Chakravarti
- Born: 19 September 1934; Shibpur, Bengal Presidency, British India
- Died: 15 December 2020 (aged 86); Kolkata, West Bengal, India
- Education: B.A Krishnagar Government College, M.A. University of Calcutta, Ph.D. Jadavpur University
- Occupations: Literary, teacher, educator, music specialist
- Spouse: Nivedita Chakravarti
- Children: Sananda Chakravarti Sreya Chakravarti
- Writing career
- Language: Bengali, India
- Notable work: Gabhir Nirjan Pathe Baul Fakir Katha Ganer Lilar Sei Kinare Sadar Mafaswal
- Notable awards: Ananda Puraskar; Sahitya Akademi Award (1985); Shiromani Award; Acharya Dinesh Chandra Sen Award; Narashinga Das Award; Sarojini Basu Gold Medal

Sudhir Chakravarti (19 September 1934 – 15 December 2020) was a Bengali educationist and essayist. He made a vast contribution in Bengal's folk culture development and research.

== Early life and career ==
Sudhir Chakravarti or Sudhir Prasad Chakravarti was born on 19 September 1934 at Shibpur. His father's name was Ramaprasad Chakravarti and his mother Beenapani Chakravarti. He was the youngest of the nine sons of Ramaprasad. Due to the fear of the Japanese bombardings in Kolkata, Chakravarti's father had shifted to Dignagar, Nadia, (where they had ancestral lands as Zamindars) from Shibpur, Howrah in his childhood. After that his family came to Krishnanagar, Nadia. Chakravarti completed his studies in Calcutta University. Chakravarti is known for his research works on Folk religion, Lalan Fakir and Cultural Anthropology in Bengal. He spent 30 years researching the folk culture by traveling to different villages all over the West Bengal. He was a professor of Bengali literature from 1958 to 1994, but even after retirement kept on teaching until 2011. Chakravarti worked in Krishnagar Government College, guest lecturer of Jadavpur University and was also associated with the Institute of Development Studies, Kolkata. He wrote and edited more than 85 books on various subjects like music, art, folk-religion, cultural anthropology. He was the editor of Bengali literary Magazine Dhrubapada. He died on 15 December 2020 in Kolkata.

== Literary career ==
From Rabindranath to Lalan Fakir, from Baul culture to clay modellers, modelling and painters and painting of rural Bengal, everything had become the subject of his interest and research. Besides research and writing, he also edited 'Dhruvapada' journal.

His contribution to the study of Bengali folk culture is immense. His pen had authored immense detailed work on the sub-religions and cult of Kartabhaja, Balahari, Sahebdhani, their belief community and their songs, which were never paid much attention to by the intellectuals. After William Hunter and Akshay Kumar Datta in the 18th century, few have paid attention to work on these sects. His book 'Bratya Lokayat Lalon' is considered as a milestone in the practice of Lalan Fakir.

== Works ==
1. Sahebdhani Sampraday O tader gaan (সাহেবধনী সম্প্রদায় তাদের গান), 1985
2. Ganer Lilar Sei Kinare (গানের লীলার সেই কিনারে), 1985
3. Krishnagarer Mritshilpo o Mritshilpi Samaj (কৃষ্ণনগরের মৃৎশিল্প ও মৃৎশিল্পী সমাজ), 1985
4. Balahari Sampraday o Tader Gaan (বলাহাড়ি সম্প্রদায় আর তাদের গান), 1986
5. Gabhir Nirjan Pathe (গভীর নির্জন পথে), 1989
6. Dwijendralal Smaran Bismaran (দ্বিজেন্দ্রলাল রায় স্মরণ বিস্মরণ), 1989
7. Bangla Ganer Sandhane (বাংলা গানের সন্ধানে), 1990
8. Sadar -Mafaswal (সদর-মফস্বল), 1990
9. Agradwiper Gopinath (অগ্রদ্বীপের গোপীনাথ), 1992
10. Nirjan Ekaker Gaan Rabindrasangeet (নির্জন এককের গান রবীন্দ্র সংগীত),1992
11. Bangla Ganer char diganta (বাংলা গানের চার দিগন্ত), 1992
12. Bratya Lokayata Lalan (ব্রাত্য লোকায়ত লালন),1992
13. Chalchitrer Chitralekha (চালচিত্রের চিত্রলেখা), 1993
14. Bangla Filmer Gaan O Satyajit Ray (বাংলা ফিল্মের গান ও সত্যজিৎ রায়),1994
15. Nirbas (নির্বাস), 1995
16. Panchagramer Karacha (পঞ্চগ্রামের কড়চা), 1995
17. Paschimbanger Mela o Mohotsav (পশ্চিমবঙ্গের মেলা ও মহোৎসব), 1996
18. Debabrata Biswaser Gaan(দেবব্রত বিশ্বাসের গান), 1997
19. Lalan (লালন), 1998
20. Mati-Prithibir Tane (মাটি-পৃথিবীর টানে), 1999
21. Baul Fakir Katha (বাউল ফকির কথা), 2001
22. Bangla Ganer Alokporbo (বাংলা গানের আলোকপর্ব), 2001
23. Gane Gane Gaoya (গানে গানে গাওয়া), 2003
24. Banglar Gounadharma : Sahebdhani O Bolahari (বাংলার গৌণধর্ম সাহেবধনী ও বলাহাড়ি), 2003
25. Rupe Barne Chande (রূপে বর্ণে ছন্দে), 2003
26. Lekha Pora Kore Je (লেখা পড়া করে যে), 2003
27. Utsabe, Melay Itihase (উৎসবে মেলায় ইতিহাসে), 2004
28. Ghanaran Bahirana (ঘরানা বাহিরানা), 2006
29. Kabitar Vichitra Pathe (কবিতার বিচিত্রপথে), 2006
30. Gaan Hote Gaane (গান হতে গানে), 2008
31. Lokayoter Antarmohol (লোকায়তের অন্তরমহল), 2008
32. Shamuk Jhinuk (শামুক ঝিনুক), 2009
33. Akhyaner Khoje (আখ্যানের খোঁজে), 2009
34. Loksomaj O Lokchitra (লোকসমাজ ও লোকচিত্র), 2009
35. Rabindranath Anekanta (রবীন্দ্রনাথ অনেকান্ত), 2010
36. Nirjansajane (নির্জনসজনে), 2011
37. Alaldost Sevakamalini lalan (আলালদোস্ত সেবাকমলিনী লালন),2011
38. Manini Rupmati Kubir Gosai (মানিনী রূপমতী কুবির গোঁসাই), 2012
39. Kabitar Khonje (কবিতার খোঁজে),2012
40. Dekha na Dekhaye Mesha (দেখা না দেখায় মেশা),2012
41. Sudhir Chakravarti Rachanavali -1 (সুধীর চক্রবর্তী রচনাবলি-প্রথম খণ্ড),2012
42. Sudhir Chakravarti Rachanavali -2 (সুধীর চক্রবর্তী রচনাবলি- দ্বিতীয় খণ্ড),2013
43. Chorano Ei Jibon (ছড়ানো এই জীবন),2013
44. Bhadrajaner Drishtite Lalan Fakir (ভদ্রজনের দৃষ্টিতে লালন ফকির), 2013
45. Sahityer Lokayata Path (সাহিত্যের লোকায়ত পাঠ), 2013
46. Anek Diner Anek Katha (অনেক দিনের অনেক কথা), 2013
47. Abataler Rupabali Abataler Padabali (অবতলের রূপাবলি, অবতলের পদাবলি),2013
48. Chhoran Ei Jibon (ছড়ানো এই জীবন), 2013
49. Bhodrojoner Drishtite Lalon Fakir (ভদ্রজনের দৃষ্টিতে লালন ফকির), 2013
50. Sahityer Lokayata Path (সাহিত্যের লোকায়ত পাঠ), 2013
51. Onek Diner Onek Kotha (অনেক দিনের অনেক কথা), 2013
52. Abotoler Rupaboli, Abotoler Padaboli (অবতলের রূপাবলি, অবতলের পদাবলি), 2013
53. Lokayater Onno Banke (লোকায়তের অন্য বাঁকে), 2014
54. Sudhir Chakraborty Rochonaboli, Tritiyo Khondo (সুধীর চক্রবর্তী রচনাবলি, তৃতীয় খণ্ড), 2014
55. Preme Prane Gane (প্রেমে প্রাণে গানে), 2014
56. Rabhikorrekha (রবিকররেখা), 2014
57. Akul Praner Utsobe (আকুল প্রাণের উৎসবে), 2014
58. Nibhr̥ito Moner Chhaya (নিভৃত মনের ছায়া), 2015
59. Dwiralap (দ্বিরালাপ), 2015
60. Ganer Bhitor Diye (গানের ভিতর দিয়ে), 2015
61. Amar Rabindranath (আমার রবীন্দ্রনাথ), 2015
62. Sudhir Chakraborty Rochonaboli, Chaturtho Khondo (সুধীর চক্রবর্তী রচনাবলি, চতুর্থ খণ্ড), 2015
63. Lalon Sai Kubir Gosai Ar Tader Gaan (লালন সাঁই কুবির গোঁসাই আর তাঁদের গান), 2015
64. Shilper Khoje (শিল্পের খোঁজে), 2016
65. Bichitro Lokayata (বিচিত্র লোকায়ত), 2016
66. Shoto Ganer Gaanmela (শত গানের গানমেলা), 2017
67. Sudhir Chakraborty Rochonaboli, Panchom Khondo (সুধীর চক্রবর্তী রচনাবলি, পঞ্চম খণ্ড), 2017
68. Krishnanagoriker Koto Kotha (কৃষ্ণনাগরিকের কত কথা), 2017
69. Shoto Shoto Gitomukhorito (শত শত গীতমুখরিত), 2018
70. Bhubonjora Ashonkhaani (ভুবনজোড়া আসনখানি), 2018
71. Rajanikanta: Dwidhaheen Onubhutil Charan (রজনীকান্ত : দ্বিধাহীন অনুভূতির চারণ), 2018
72. Alaldost Ar Tin Shohojiya Akhyan (আলালদোস্ত আর তিন সহজিয়া আখ্যান), 2019
73. Sanskritir Lokayan (সংস্কৃতির লোকায়ন), 2019
74. Eksho Ganer Marmakotha (একশো গানের মর্মকথা), 2019
75. Sudhir Chakraborty Rochonaboli, # Shoshto Khondo (সুধীর চক্রবর্তী রচনাবলি, ষষ্ট খণ্ড), 2019
76. Nuton Dekhar Dekha (নূতন দেখার দেখা), 2019
77. Elem Notun Deshe (এলেম নতুন দেশে), 2019
78. Meghe Meghe Taray Taray (মেঘে মেঘে তারায় তারায়), 2019
79. Chalchitra (চালচিত্র),2021
80. Sudhir Chakrabory Rachanavali Seventh Volume ( সুধীর চক্রবর্তী রচনাবলী ৭), 2022
81. Agranthita Sudhir Chakravarti (অগ্রন্থিত সুধীর চক্রবর্তী), 2023

== Awards ==
- Ananda Purashkar in 2002 for his book Baul Fakir Katha
- Sahitya Akademi Award in 2004.
- Eminent Teacher award from Calcutta University in 2006,
- Narasimha Das award Medal from Delhi University
- Rabindratatvacharya award by the Tagore research Institute
- Dr. Sukumar Sen Gold Medal from the Asiatic Society.
