= Dignagar =

- Village
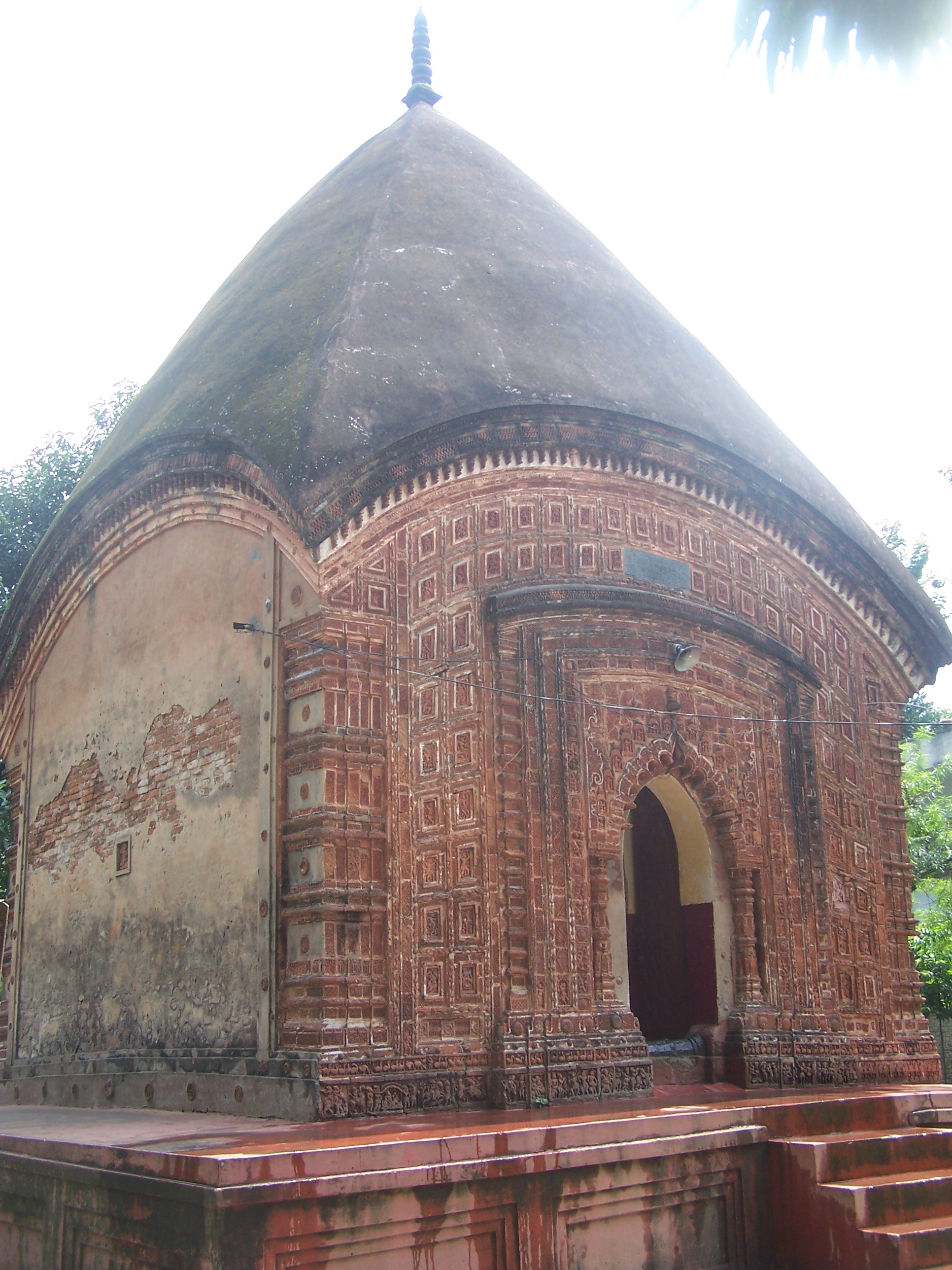
- Temple of Raghabeswar Siva at Dignagar

- Location in West Bengal, India Dignagar (India)
- Coordinates: 23.33732°N 88.451165°E
- Country: India
- State: West Bengal
- District: Nadia

Population (2011)
  - Total: 6,023

Languages
  - Official: Bengali, English
- Time zone: UTC+5:30 (IST)
- Telephone/STD code: 03472
- Vehicle registration: WB51/52
- Lok Sabha constituency: Krishnanagar
- Vidhan Sabha constituency: Krishnanagar Uttar
- Website: nadia.gov.in

Dignagar is a village in the Krishnanagar I CD block in the Krishnanagar Sadar subdivision of the Nadia district, West Bengal, India.

== History ==
It is an ancient village. According to the book Nadia Kahini written by renowned researcher Mohit Roy, it was a prosperous village from the period of Krishna Chandra Roy. In 1673, Roy dug a big dighi and established three temples. It is a place where Lord Chaitanya came and from that time the people of the village observe a 3 days celebration with kirtan at 'Kalpataru Tala', where Lord Chaitanya sat for sometime with his followers. Rabindranath Tagore also came there to visit his relatives.

== Geography ==
Dignagar is located at 23.33732°N 88.451165°E,

== Demographics ==
According to the 2011 Census of India, Dignagar had a total population of 6,023, of which 3,097 (51%) were males and 2,926 (49%) were females. Population in the age range 0-6 years was 538. The total number of literate persons in Dignagar was 3,767 (68.68% of the population over 6 years).

== Culture ==
David J. McCutchion mentions several temples at Dignagar:

- Small 18th century Shiva temple with terracotta decoration
- Richly decorated charchala
- Raghabeswara temple (1669) – charchala structure with rich terracotta decoration on two sides
- Mahaprabhu temple
