= Sonda, Nadia =

Sonda
- Census Town
- Location in West Bengal, India Sonda (India)
- Coordinates: 23.40732°N 88.523165°E
- Country: India
- State: West Bengal
- District: Nadia

Area
  - Total: 5.7467 km^{2} (2.2188 sq mi)

Population (2011)
  - Total: 4,511
  - Density: 785.0/km^{2} (2,033/sq mi)

Languages
  - Official: Bengali, English
- Time zone: UTC+5:30 (IST)
- PIN: 741103
- Telephone/STD code: 03471
- Lok Sabha constituency: Krishnanagar
- Vidhan Sabha constituency: Krishannagar Uttar
- Website: nadia.gov.in

Sonda is a census town in the Krishnanagar I CD block in the Krishnanagar Sadar subdivision of the Nadia district in the state of West Bengal, India.

== Geography ==
Cities and towns in Krishnanagr Sadar subdivision of Nadia district
M: municipal town/ city, CT: census town, R: rural/ urban centre, H: place of historical/ religious interest, T: place of tourist interest.
Owing to space constraints in the small map, the actual locations in a larger map may vary slightly

=== Location ===
Sonda is located at 23.40732°N 88.523165°E.

As per the map of Krishnagar I CD block, both Sonda and Paschimbhatjangla are adjacent to Krishnanagr.

=== Area overview ===
Nadia district is mostly alluvial plains lying to the east of Hooghly River, locally known as Bhagirathi. The alluvial plains are cut across by such distributaries as Jalangi, Churni and Ichhamati. With these rivers getting silted up, floods are a recurring feature. The Krishnanagar Sadar subdivision, presented in the map alongside, has the Bhagirathi on the west, with Purba Bardhaman district lying across the river. The long stretch along the Bhagirathi has many swamps. The area between the Bhagirathi and the Jalangi, which flows through the middle of the subdivision, is known as Kalantar, a low-lying tract of black clay soil. A big part of the subdivision forms the Krishnanagar-Santipur Plain, which occupies the central part of the district. The Jalangi, after flowing through the middle of the subdivision, turns right and joins the Bhagirathi. On the south-east, the Churni separates the Krishnanagar-Santipur Plain from the Ranaghat-Chakdaha Plain. The east forms the boundary with Bangladesh. The subdivision is moderately urbanized. 20.795% of the population lives in urban areas and 79.205% lives in rural areas.

Note: The map alongside presents some of the notable locations in the subdivision. All places marked in the map are linked in the larger full screen map. All the four subdivisions are presented with maps on the same scale – the size of the maps vary as per the area of the subdivision.

== Demographics ==
According to the 2011 Census of India, Sonda had a total population of 4,511, of which 2,316 (51%) were males and 2,195 (49%) were females. Population in the age range 0–6 years was 451. The total number of literate persons in Sonda was 2,983 (73.47% of the population over 6 years).

The following municipality and census towns were part of Krishnanagar Urban Agglomeration in 2011 census: Krishnanagar (M), Baruihuda (CT), Paschimbhatjangla (CT) and Sonda.

== Infrastructure ==
According to the District Census Handbook 2011, Nadia, Sonda covered an area of 5.7467 km^{2}. Among the civic amenities, the protected water supply involved hand pump, tubewell, borewell. It had 430 domestic electric connections. Among the medical facilities it had 1 hospital, 1 dispensary/ health centre, 10 medicine shops. Among the educational facilities it had were 2 primary schools, nearest senior secondary schools at Krishnanagar 3 km away. It had 1 management institute/ college.
