= Sadhan Ghosh =

Indian politician

Member of the West Bengal Legislative Assembly
- Incumbent
- Assumed office May 2026
- Preceded by: Ujjal Biswas
- Constituency: Krishnanagar Dakshin

Personal details
- Party: Bharatiya Janata Party
- Profession: Politician

Sadhan Ghosh is an Indian politician from West Bengal. He is a member of West Bengal Legislative Assembly, from Krishnanagar Dakshin Assembly constituency.
