= Krishnanagar Dakshin Assembly constituency =

Krishnanagar Dakshin
- Constituency No. 85 for the West Bengal Legislative Assembly
- Interactive Map Outlining Krishnanagar Dakshin Assembly Constituency

Constituency details
- Country: India
- Region: East India
- State: West Bengal
- District: Nadia
- Lok Sabha constituency: Krishnanagar
- Established: 1951
- Total electors: 225,118
- Reservation: None

Member of Legislative Assembly
- 18th West Bengal Legislative Assembly
- Incumbent Sadhan Ghosh
- Party: BJP
- Elected year: 2026

Krishnanagar Dakshin Assembly constituency is an assembly constituency in Nadia district in the Indian state of West Bengal.

== Overview ==
As per orders of the Delimitation Commission, No. 85 Krishnanagar Dakshin Assembly constituency is composed of the following: Bhat Jungla, Chak Dilnagar, Daypara, Dignagar and Ruipukur gram panchayats of Krishnanagar I community development block, and Krishnanagar II community development block.

Krishnanagar Dakshin Assembly constituency is part of No. 12 Krishnanagar (Lok Sabha constituency). Krishnanagar East and West were earlier part of Krishnanagar (Lok Sabha constituency).

== Members of the Legislative Assembly ==
=== Krishnanagar Dakshin ===
Year	Name	Party
2011	Ujjal Biswas	All India Trinamool Congress
2016	Ujjal Biswas	All India Trinamool Congress
2021	Ujjal Biswas	All India Trinamool Congress
2026	Sadhan Ghosh	Bharatiya Janata Party

== Election results ==
=== 2026 ===
2026 West Bengal Legislative Assembly election: Krishnanagar Dakshin
Party	Candidate	Votes	%	±%
BJP	Sadhan Ghosh	102,862	52.19	+10.06
AITC	Ujjal Biswas	75,061	38.09	−8.79
CPI(ML)L	Labani Jangi	9,468	4.8	
INC	Abdur Rahim Shaikh	3,219	1.63	
NOTA	None of the above	1,119	0.57	−0.54
Majority		27,801	14.1	+9.35
Turnout		197,084	93.54	+6.61
BJP gain from AITC		Swing		

=== 2021 ===
West Bengal assembly elections, 2021: Krishnanagar Dakshin constituency
Party	Candidate	Votes	%	±%
AITC	Ujjal Biswas	91,738	46.88	
BJP	Mahadev Sarkar	82,433	42.13	
CPI(M)	Sumit Biswas	15,606	7.98	
NOTA	None of the above	2,165	1.11	
Majority		9,305	4.75	
Turnout		195,685	86.93	
AITC hold		Swing		

=== 2016 ===
In the 2016 election, Ujjal Biswas of Trinamool Congress defeated his nearest rival Meghlal Sheikh of CPI(M).

West Bengal assembly elections, 2016: Krishnanagar Dakshin constituency
Party	Candidate	Votes	%	±%
AITC	Ujjal Biswas	80,711	46.30	▼0.08
CPI(M)	Meghlal Sheikh	67,897	38.90	▼0.31
BJP	Mahadev Sarkar	22,850		
None of the Above	None of the Above	2,538		
BSP	Sudeb Sarkar	1,842		
CPI(ML)L	Anchharul Haque Biswas	1,226		
Turnout		177,064	87.75	
AITC hold		Swing		

=== 2011 ===
In the 2011 election, Ujjal Biswas of Trinamool Congress defeated his nearest rival Rama Biswas of CPI(M).

West Bengal assembly elections, 2011: Krishnanagar Dakshin constituency
Party	Candidate	Votes	%	±%
AITC	Ujjal Biswas	71,392	46.38	+9.49#
CPI(M)	Rama Biswas	60,364	39.21	−9.59
BJP	Mahadev Sarkar	14,398	9.35	
Independent	Amal Majumdar	3,347		
CPI(ML)L	Anchharul Hoque Bishwas	3,200		
BSP	Mukunda Lal Sarkar	1,230		
Turnout		153,931	88.47	
AITC gain from CPI(M)		Swing	+10.08#	

Amal Majumdar, contesting as an independent candidate, was a rebel Congress candidate.

.# Swing calculated on Congress+Trinamool Congress vote percentages taken together in 2006 for the Krishnagar West seat.
