= Dayal Nagar =

- Interactive map of Dayal Nagar
- Country: India
- State: West Bengal
- District: Nadia district
- Elevation: 19 m (62 ft)

Population (2011)
  - Total: 1,445

Languages
  - Official: Bengali, English
- Time zone: UTC+5:30 (IST)
- PIN: 741126
- Telephone code: 03474
- Lok Sabha constituency: Krishnanagar (Mahua Moitra)
- Vidhan Sabha constituency: Nakashi Para (Santanu Dey)

Dayal Nagar is a village of Nadia district in the state of West Bengal, India. It is situated at a distance 23 km from Krishnagar, district headquarters. It is 2.5 km away (towards South) from Bethuadahari.

== Area ==
Total area is 80 hectare i.e. 0.80 square KM including a cultivation area of 57 hectare.

== Population ==
- Population as per 2011 census record:
- Total: 1545
- Male: 816
- Female: 729

== History ==
Many people emigrated to Dayal Nagar from Bangladesh at the time of the partition of India in 1947 and latter on, in 1971. Initially, there were several camps set up by the government which were referred to by numbers. Today there are many places where the old numbering system is still used.

== Geography ==
Dayal Nagar is located at 23°35′17″N 88°24′05″E.

40% of the land is undeveloped and is used for cultivation, Typical crops are rice, wheat, mustard, jute and vegetables. Farmers of this area are famous for continuous production of different types of Vegetables throughout the year. 5% of the land is ponds and lakes used for fish production.

== Transport ==
Dayal Nagar is connected with Kolkata and the rest of the district by Bethuadahari Railway Station and NH-34. Buses operated by SBSTC, CSTC, NBSTC and many other private buses provide reliable means of road transportation. Long distance Buses connect Dayal Nagar to main cities of west Bengal, such as- Kolkata (130 km), Siliguri (445 km), Howrah (153 km), Coochbehar (569 km), Durgapur (185 km), Malda (189 km), Digha (325 km). The other means of road transport in the village include Rickshaws, Vans, Cycle, bikes, cars etc.

== Climate ==
According to the Köppen climate classification System Dayal Nagar has a Tropical Wet and Dry or Tropical Savanna type climate. It features a long and hot Summer followed by- wet and humid Monsoon, cloudless and pleasant Autumn, mild and dry Winter, sunny and warm Spring.

| MONTH | MEAN TEMPERATURE (°C) | MEAN MAXIMUM TEMPERATURE (°C) | MEAN MINIMUM TEMPERATURE (°C) | AVERAGE RAINFALL (MM) |
|---|---|---|---|---|
| JANUARY | 18.9 | 26.3 | 11.6 | 13 |
| FEBRUARY | 21.4 | 29.0 | 13.9 | 14 |
| MARCH | 26.7 | 34.5 | 18.9 | 22 |
| APRIL | 30.6 | 37.8 | 23.4 | 36 |
| MAY | 30.5 | 36.1 | 25 | 80 |
| JUNE | 30.2 | 34.5 | 26 | 268 |
| JULY | 29.0 | 32.3 | 25.8 | 313 |
| AUGUST | 29.1 | 32.3 | 25.9 | 268 |
| SEPTEMBER | 29.2 | 32.7 | 25.7 | 213 |
| OCTOBER | 27.7 | 32.2 | 23.2 | 105 |
| NOVEMBER | 23.3 | 29.6 | 17.1 | 15 |
| DECEMBER | 19.7 | 26.8 | 12.7 | 3 |
