= Sultanpur, Nadia =

Sultanpur
- Sultanpur; Nakashipara; West Bengal; India
- Coordinates: 23.60°N 88.32°E
- Country: India
- State: West Bengal
- District: Nadia

Languages
  - Official: Bengali, English

Literacy (2011)
- Time zone: UTC+5:30 (IST)
- PIN: 741137
- Telephone/STD code: 03474
- Lok Sabha constituency: Krishnanagar
- Vidhan Sabha constituency: Nakashipara
- Website: nadia.nic.in

Sultanpur is a village in the Nakashipara CD block in the Krishnanagar Sadar subdivision of the Nadia district in the state of West Bengal, India.

== Demographics ==
According to the 2011 Census of India, Sultanpur had a total population of 1,733, of which 886 were males and 847 were females. Population in the age range 0–6 years was 229.
