= Madanmohan Tarkalankar =

Sanskrit scholar and Bengali writer

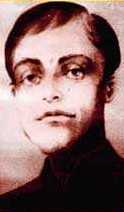
- Born: January 3, 1817; Bilwagram, Nakashipara, Bethuadahari, Nadia district, Bengal presidency, British India
- Died: 9 March 1858 (aged 41); Kandi, Bengal Presidency, British India
- Monuments: Asannagar Madan Mohan Tarkalankar College, Post Graduate in Sanskrit Department of Krishnanath College
- Other names: Madan Mohan Tarkalankar
- Education: Calcutta Presidency College
- Movement: Bengali Renaissance

Madanmohan Tarkalankar (3 January 1817 – 9 March 1858) is one of the Sanskrit scholars of the Indian subcontinent in the nineteenth century who has made a special contribution to the development of the written Bengali language. He is also considered one of the pioneers of the Bengali renaissance. He was a professor at Fort William College and authored several textbooks on early childhood education.

== Birth and family identity ==
He was born in 1817 in a Hindu Brahmin family in Bethuadahari, Nakashipara. His father's name is Ramdhan Chattopadhyay. He had two children named Bhuvanmala and Kundamala.

== Education ==
He studied at the Sanskrit College, where he was a classmate of Ishwar Chandra Vidyasagar. He later studied at the Presidency University.

== Work life ==
He was a professor of literature at Fort William College. Later in November 1850, he was appointed as the District Judge of Murshidabad. He was appointed Deputy Magistrate of Murshidabad (in December 1855) and Kandi in 1856.

== Social reformer ==
He was one of the founders of the practice of 'Hindu widow marriage'.

The first widow marriage took place in 1857. The bridegroom was Srishchandra Vidyaratna and the bride was Kalimati. Madanmohan Tarkalankar was one of the people who helped to find and contact the two of them.

— Mrinalkanti Chakraborty, a retired teacher of Berhampore College,

His contribution to the spread of women's education is undeniable. In 1849, when Bethune founded the Hindu Mahila School, he admitted his two daughters there. He used to teach girls in this school without pay. In 1850, he wrote a groundbreaking essay in favor of wife education in Sarvashubhakari magazine.

== Books ==
Madanmohan Tarkalanka devoted considerable effort to spreading education in the Bengali language. The book Shishusiksha, written by him, was also published before the book Barnaparichay, written by Ishwarchandra Vidyasagar. He published Shisushiksha in 1849 and a second part in 1850. Later, the third part and fourth part (Bodhodoy). He wrote two books in his childhood: Basabdutta and Rasatrangini. (Note: 'বাসব দত্তা','রসতরঙ্গিনী')

His poem "Amar Pan" is one of the poems in Bengali textbooks for second class students in Bangladesh and is considered an excellent guide for the formation of children's psyche.

He translated 14 Sanskrit books. Some of his notable books are:-

- Rasatrangini (1838)
- Basabdutta (1836)
- Shishushiksha -3 parts (1839 to 1851)

== Death ==
On 9 March 1858, he died at Kandi of cholera.
