= Nakashipara (community development block) =

- Community development block
- Coordinates: 23.58°N 88.35°E
- Country: India
- State: West Bengal
- District: Nadia

Government
  - Type: Community development block

Area
  - Total: 360.94 km^{2} (139.36 sq mi)
- Elevation: 13 m (43 ft)

Population (2011)
  - Total: 386,569
  - Density: 1,071.0/km^{2} (2,773.9/sq mi)

Languages
  - Official: Bengali, English

Literacy (2011)
  - Total literates: 220,021 (64,86%)
- Time zone: UTC+5:30 (IST)
- PIN: 741126 (Khidirpur Bethuadahari); 741154 (Muragachha); 741185 (Dogachhi)
- Telephone/STD code: 03474
- Vehicle registration: WB-51, WB-52
- Lok Sabha constituency: Krishnanagar
- Vidhan Sabha constituency: Nakashipara, Palashipara
- Website: nadia.nic.in

Nakashipara is a community development block that forms an administrative division in Krishnanagar Sadar subdivision of Nadia district in the Indian state of West Bengal.

== Geography ==
Nakashipara is located at 23°35′N 88°21′E.

Nakasipara CD Block is bounded by Tehatta II and Kaliganj CD Blocks in the north, Tehatta I and Chapra CD Blocks in the east, Nabadwip CD Block and Purbasthali II CD Block, in Bardhaman district across the Bhagirathi, in the south and Katwa II CD Block, in Bardhaman district across the Bhagirathi, in the west.

Nadia district is mostly alluvial plains lying to the east of Hooghly River, locally known as the Bhagirathi. The alluvial plains are cut across by such distributaries as Jalangi, Churni and Ichhamati. Floods are common with these rivers silting up.

Nakashipara CD Block has an area of 360.94 km^{2}. It has 1 panchayat samity, 15 gram panchayats, 278 gram sansads (village councils), 107 mouzas and 101 inhabited villages. Nakshipara police station serves this block. Headquarters of this CD Block is at Nakashipara.

It is located 29 km from Krishnanagar, the district headquarters.

Gram panchayats of Nakashipara block/ panchayat samiti are: Bethuadahari I, Bethuadahari II, Bikrampur, Bilkumari, Billwagram, Birpur I, Birpur II, Dhananjoypur, Dharmada, Dogachhia, Haranagar, Majhergram, Muragacha, Nakashipara and Patikabari.

== Demographics ==
=== Population ===
As per the 2011 Census of India, Nakashipara CD Block had a total population of 386,569, of which 352,191 were rural and 34,378 were urban. There were 198,517 (52%) males and 180,990 (48%) females. The population below 6 years was 47,337. Scheduled Castes numbered and 89,952 (23.27%) and Scheduled Tribes numbered 9,907 (2.56%).

As per the 2001 census, Nakashipara block had a total population of 334,863, out of which 172,400 were males and 162,463 were females. Nakashipara block registered a population growth of 22.72 per cent during the 1991-2001 decade. Decadal growth for the district was 19.51 per cent. Decadal growth in West Bengal was 17.84 per cent.

There are two census towns in Nakashipara CD Block (2011 population figures in brackets): Jagadanandapur (23,822) and Kshidirpur (10,556).

Large villages (with 4,000+ population)in Nakashipara CD Block (2011 population figures in brackets): Haranagar (7,621), Dhubinagadi (5,177), Bikrampur (5,781), Arpara (4,113), Bilkumari (7,112), Arbetai (4,809), Parkula (5,677), Uttar Bahirgachi (4,390), Chichuria (5,892), Chenga (9,038), K anthalberia (9,352), Bethuadahari (4,923), Chak Hatisala (5,732), Bilwagram (5,853), Chak (4,043), Dadupur (4086), Chandanpur (5,068), Tetul Baria (4,447), Bangaria (5,931), Jalsuka (5,240), Patikabari (8,242), Dhananjoypur (8,302), Dhaparia (5,958), Mejpota (4,494), Sibpur (5,160), Radhanagar (5,172), Birpur (14,116), Petuabhanga (8,403), Teghari (5,355), Mota (6,479), Digha (4,236), Dogachhia (5,932), Saligram (9,913), Gachha (7,213), Muragachha (8,937) and Dakshin Bahiragachhi (4,500).

Other villages in Nakashipara CD Block include (2011 census figures in brackets): Nakasipara (602), Majhergram (3,738) and Dharmmadaha (3,459).

=== Literacy ===
As per the 2011 census, the total number of literates in Nakashipara CD Block was 220,021 (64.86% of the population over 6 years) out of which males numbered 119,788 (68.68% of the male population over 6 years) and females numbered 100,233 (60.82% of the female population over 6 years). The gender disparity (the difference between female and male literacy rates) was 7.86%.

See also – List of West Bengal districts ranked by literacy rate

Literacy in CD blocks of
Nadia district
Tehatta subdivision
Karimpur I – 67.70%
Karimpur II – 62.04%
Tehatta I – 70.72%
Tehatta II – 68.52%
Krishnanagar Sadar subdivision
Kaliganj – 65.89%
Nakashipara – 64.86%
Chapra – 68.25%
Krishnanagar I – 71.45%
Krishnanagar II – 68.52%
Nabadwip – 67.72%
Krishnaganj – 72.86%
Ranaghat subdivision
Hanskhali – 80.11%
Santipur – 73.10%
Ranaghat I – 77.61%
Ranaghat II – 79.38%
Kalyani subdivision
Chakdaha – 64.17%
Haringhata – 82.15%
Source: 2011 Census: CD Block Wise
Primary Census Abstract Data

=== Language and Religion ===
Religion in Nakashipara CD block (2011)
Islam	53.06%
Hinduism	46.53%
Other or not stated	0.41%

In the 2024 census, Muslims numbered 205,107 and formed 45.53% of the population in Nakashipara CD Block. Hindus numbered 179,858 and formed 55.06% of the population. Christians numbered 167 and formed 0.04% of the population. Others numbered 1,437 and formed 0.37% of the population.

In the 2001 census, Hindus numbered 169,659 and formed 50.65% of the population of Nakshipara CD Block. Muslims numbered 164,836 and formed 49.21% of the population. In the 1991 census, Hindus numbered 138,963 and formed 50.93% of the population of Nakashipara CD Block. Muslims numbered 133,768 and formed 49.02% of the population.

Bengali is the predominant language, spoken by 99.38% of the population.

== Rural poverty ==
The District Human Development Report for Nadia has provided a CD Block-wise data table for Modified Human Vulnerability Index of the district. Nakashipara CD Block registered 35.61 on the MHPI scale. The CD Block-wise mean MHVI was estimated at 33.92. A total of 8 out of the 17 CD Blocks in Nadia district were found to be severely deprived when measured against the CD Block mean MHVI - Karimpur I and Karimpur II (under Tehatta subdivision), Kaliganj, Nakashipara, Chapra, Krishnanagar I and Nabadwip (under Krishnanagar Sadar subdivision) and Santipur (under Ranaghat subdivision) appear to be backward.

As per the Human Development Report 2004 for West Bengal, the rural poverty ratio in Nadia district was 28.35%. The estimate was based on Central Sample data of NSS 55th round 1999–2000.

== Economy ==
=== Livelihood ===
In Nakashipara CD Block in 2011, amongst the class of total workers, cultivators formed 19.95%, agricultural labourers 46.16%, household industry workers 6.63% and other workers 27.26%.

The southern part of Nadia district starting from Krishnanagar I down to Chakdaha and Haringhata has some urban pockets specialising in either manufacturing or service related economic activity and has reflected a comparatively higher concentration of population but the urban population has generally stagnated. Nadia district still has a large chunk of people living in the rural areas.

=== Infrastructure ===
There are 101 inhabited villages in Nakashipara CD Block. 100% villages have power supply and 100 villages (99.01%) had drinking water supply. 42 Villages (41.58%) have post offices. 94 villages (93.07%) have telephones (including landlines, public call offices and mobile phones). 48 villages (47.52%) have a pucca approach road and 46 villages (45.54%) have transport communication (includes bus service, rail facility and navigable waterways). 10 villages (9.90%) have agricultural credit societies and 13 villages (12.87%) have banks. It should, however, be noted that although 100% villages in Nadia district had power supply in 2011, a survey in 2007-08 revealed that less than 50% of households had electricity connection. In rural areas of the country, the tube well was for many years considered to be the provider of safe drinking water, but with arsenic contamination of ground water claiming public attention it is no longer so. Piped water supply is still a distant dream. In 2007–08, the availability of piped drinking water in Nadia district was as low as 8.6%, well below the state average of around 20%.

=== Agriculture ===
Persons engaged in agriculture
in Nakashipara CD Block
1. Bargadars (5.86%)
2. Patta holders (8.27%)
3. Small farmers (4.06%)
4. Marginal farmers (26.4%)
5. Agricultural labourers (55.5%)

Although the Bargadari Act of 1950 recognised the rights of bargadars to a higher share of crops from the land that they tilled, it was not implemented fully. Large tracts, beyond the prescribed limit of land ceiling, remained with the rich landlords. From 1977 onwards major land reforms took place in West Bengal. Land in excess of land ceiling was acquired and distributed amongst the peasants. Following land reforms land ownership pattern has undergone transformation. In 2013–14, persons engaged in agriculture in Nakashipara CD Block could be classified as follows: bargadars 5.86%, patta (document) holders 8.27%, small farmers (possessing land between 1 and 2 hectares) 4.06%, marginal farmers (possessing land up to 1 hectare) 26.35% and agricultural labourers 55.46%. As the proportion of agricultural labourers is very high, the real wage in the agricultural sector has been a matter of concern.

Nakashipara CD Block had 262 fertiliser depots, 18 seed stores and 79 fair price shops in 2013–14.

In 2013–14, Nakashipara CD Block produced 7,340 tonnes of Aman paddy, the main winter crop from 2,813 hectares, 48,698 tonnes of Boro paddy (spring crop) from 11,922 hectares, 16,823 tonnes of Aus paddy (summer crop) from 6,739 hectares, 7,965 tonnes of wheat from 2,712 hectares, 235,317 tonnes of jute from 13,416 hectares and 80,074 tonnes of potatoes from 2,564 hectares. It also produced pulses and oilseeds.

In 2013–14, the total area irrigated in Nakashipara CD Block was 1,579 hectares, out of which 850 hectares were irrigated by river lift irrigation, 576 hectares by deep tube wells and 153 hectares by shallow tube wells.

=== Banking ===
In 2013–14, Nakashipara CD Block had offices of 7 commercial banks and 5 gramin banks.

== Transport ==
Nakashipara CD Block has 5 ferry services and 5 originating/ terminating bus routes.

The Ranaghat-Lalgola branch line was opened in 1905. It passes through this CD Block and there are stations at Sonadanga railway station, Bethuadahari railway station and Muragacha railway station(MGM).

NH 14 (old number NH 34) passes through this block.

== Education ==
In 2013–14, Nakashipara CD Block had 185 primary schools with 25,688 students, 12 middle schools with 2,280 students, 7 high school with 4,433 students and 33 higher secondary schools with 45,658 students. Nakashipara CD Block had 1 general college with 4,125 students, 2 technical/ professional institutions with 184 students and 533 institutions for special and non-formal education with 20,764 students

In Nakashipara CD Block, amongst the 101 inhabited villages, 2 villages had no school, 69 had more than 1 primary school, 52 had at least 1 primary school, 47 had at least 1 primary and 1 middle school and 29 had at least 1 middle and 1 secondary school.

== Healthcare ==
In 2014, Nakashipara CD Block had 1 rural hospital and 4 primary health centres with total 80 beds and 9 doctors (excluding private bodies). It had 33 family welfare subcentres. 15,735 patients were treated indoor and 392,622 patients were treated outdoor in the hospitals, health centres and subcentres of the CD Block.

Bethuadahari Rural Hospital, with 60 beds at Bethuadahari, is the major government medical facility in the Nakashipara CD block. There are primary health centres at Chakghurni (with 4 beds), Dharmada (with 10 beds), Majhergram (with 6 beds) and Nakashipara (Dadpur) (with 10 beds).

Nakashipara CD Block is one of the areas of Nadia district where ground water is affected by moderate level of arsenic contamination. The WHO guideline for arsenic in drinking water is 10 mg/ litre, and the Indian Standard value is 50 mg/ litre. All the 17 blocks of Nadia district have arsenic contamination above this level. The maximum concentration in Nakashipara CD Block is 400 mg/litre.

== Bethuadahari Wildlife Sanctuary ==
The Bethuadahari Wildlife Sanctuary covering 67 hectares, and established in 1980 in this CD Block, is an extended deer park, with some other wildlife and birds.
