= Barnaparichay =

Bengali primer written by Ishwar Chandra Vidyasagar

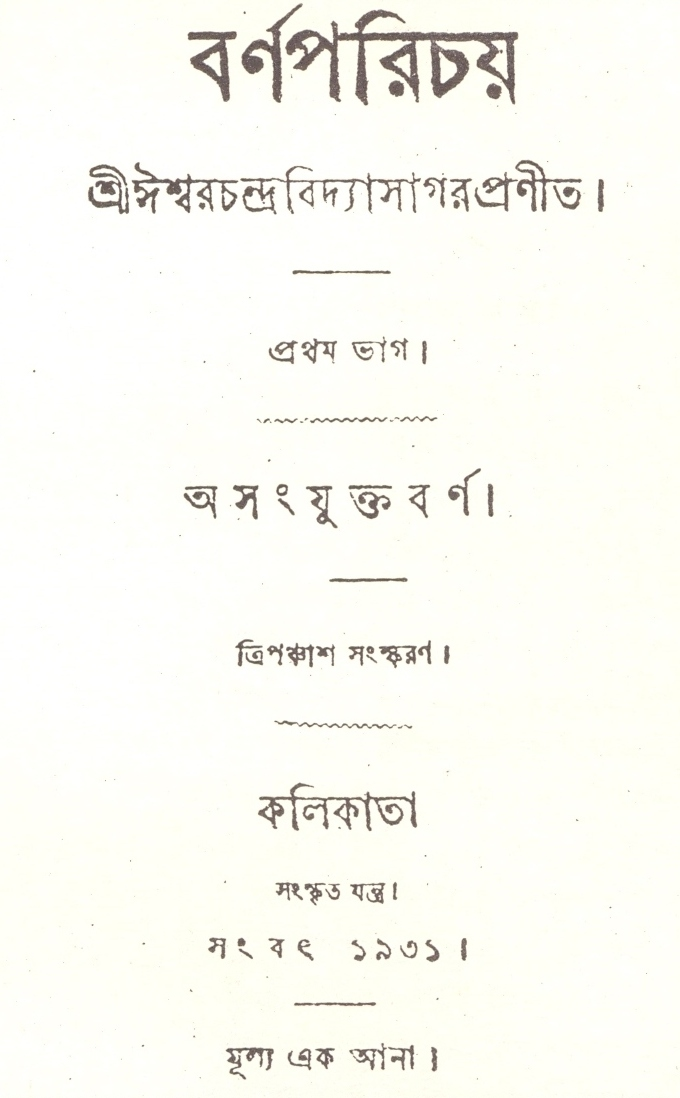
- Title page of 1931 edition
- Author: Ishwar Chandra Vidyasagar
- Original title: বর্ণপরিচয়
- Language: Bengali
- Genre: Primer
- Publication date: 1855
- Publication place: India

Barnaparichay (Note: Barna Parichay, also known as Bornoporichoy; Bengali:বর্ণপরিচয়; Bengali pronunciation: [bɔrnoporitʃoj]) is a Bengali primer written by 19th century Indian social reformer Ishwar Chandra Vidyasagar. It was first published in 1855. This is considered as "The Most Influential Primer of Bengal". The primer had two parts. (Note: Part 1 (Prothom bhag) and Part 2 (Dwitiya bhag)) This reflected Vidayasagar's knowledge, expertise and background as a Sanskrit scholar. The success of the first part of the primer inspired Vidyasagar to work on the second part. It remained an important source for teaching Bengali. This standardized the Bengali alphabet.

== Composition history ==
Before the publication of Barnaparichay, many Bengali teaching primer books were available in the market. Some examples are Bangla Śikṣagrantha (বাঙ্গালা শিক্ষাগ্রন্থ)(1821); Barnamala 1st Part (বর্ণমালা প্রথম ভাগ)(1853) and Barnamala 2nd part(বর্ণমালা দ্বিতীয় ভাগ)(1854) by School Book Society; Śiśusebadhi(শিশুসেবধি)(1854) by Kshetramohan Dutta in three parts; ŚiśuŚikṣa books by Madanmohan Tarkalankar (শিশুশিক্ষা গ্রন্থ)। But these books didn't gain much popularity. The authors didn't have the ability to bring a revolution in Bengali alphabet system. It id said that once Paricharan Sarkar and Vidyasagar decided to write primer book in English and Bengali. Therefore, Paricharn published First Book of Reading and Vidyasagar published Barnaparichay(Prothom bhag)[Translated]

— Asitkumar Bandyopadhyay

While visiting a school in village, on the way Vidyasagar made the manuscript of the Barnaparichay while sitting a palanquin. At 15/4/1855 (Note: 1st Baisakh,Samvat) Barnaparichay (Prothom bhag) is published and in 14/6/1855, Second part(Dwitiya Bhag) is published. At first publish, it didn't gained much popularity, and Vidyasagar gets nervous. But it gets popular in order.[Translated]

— Biharilal Sarkar

English book written by Paricharan was popular in Bengal for long time. But in the context of the Globalisation, the book doesn't have much value anymore. But Barnaparichay is still used as a first primer book to teach Bengali to kids in Bengal. Now colorised versions of book are also available.

== Features ==
- ৯ is removed from vowel list. Now it's only used for Sanskrit transliteration of ऌ.
- The pronunciation of second "ব"in Bengali is same as first one but is repeated for second time.
- The text has been written in simple and short sentences suitable for children. Here first the child learns the letters in alphabetical order, learns small words by mouth with the letters, then a test of letter recognition, then the beginning of learning to spell by adding letters and letters. Then there are small short prose compositions in easy to understand short sentences.
- Here we see that instead of memorizing the previously unintelligible syllables, the child is learning familiar words and becoming familiar with fluent Bengali prose writing. Thus Vidyasagar paved the way for simple and modern Bengali prose for all educated Bengalis.
- The important thing is punctuation. The awareness and application of punctuation in Bengali prose has not been seen before. Vidyasagar's use of punctuation in these fluent prose is noteworthy. An example can be drawn from the text number 19 of Barnaprichay:-
  - গোপাল যখন পড়িতে যায়, পথে খেলা করে না; সকলের আগে পাঠশালায় যায়; পাঠশালায় গিয়া আপনার জায়গায় বসে; আপনার জায়গায় বসিয়া, বই খুলিয়া পড়িতে থাকে; যখন গুরু মহাশয় নূতন পড়া দেন, মন দিয়া শুনে।
  - (When Gopal goes to read, he does not play on the way; goes to the classroom before everyone else; goes to class and sits in her seat; Sitting in your seat, opening the book and reading; When Guru Mahashay (Teacher) gives a new reading, he listens with his mind.)[Translation]

The special identity of his reforming mind is found in the abundance of his use of punctuation marks.[Translated]

— Suniti Kumar Chatterji, Linguist

- The 20 lessons in this book can be called the beginning of Bengali children's literature. Small sentences, pictures as well as rhythm.
  - For example-
    - ২ পাঠ: পথ ছাড়। জল খাও। হাত ধর। বাড়ী যাও।
      - [Translation]Lesson 2: Give way. drink water hold hands go home
    - ৩ পাঠ: কথা কয়। জল পড়ে। মেঘ ডাকে। হাত নাড়ে। খেলা করে।
      - [Translation]Lesson 3: He talks. Water falls. Cloud thunders. Nods hand. Plays.

=== Quotes related to features ===
- He was a pioneer of modern teacher-education. He has also written several suggestions for teachers on teaching. Vidyasagar has given guidance on varnayojana in both parts of Barnaparichay. In the preface of the sixth edition of the first part he writes for teachers:-

It is seen almost everywhere, boys says vowel a(স্বরের অ)(ɔ),vowel ā(স্বরের আ), in these two letter places. In which they do not say like that, but only say, a(অ);it is necessary to give advice like that.[Translation]

Many have written useful Bangla prose and many are still writing it today. It is not impossible nowadays to be aware of the jhanga inherent in Bangla prose. But at a time when examples of good prose were rarely seen, it is surprising to think that Vidyasagar was able to discover the potential or the existence of that inherent jhangar of Bengali prose by his unique talent. He had a keen sense of the joy that readers and listeners can derive from the intonation of prose.[Translated]

— Suniti Kumar Chatterji, Linguist

By establishing a sound-harmony between the verses of the prose and maintaining an endless rhythmic flow in its movement, by selecting gentle and strong words, Vidyasagar has given beauty and perfection to Bengali. He went towards to write everything in easy and simple prose. Even before that 150 years ago, Vidyasagar did not draw any religious connection in his works for children. There is no need for religion and religious reform with stories, he emphasized on moral education, understanding good and bad and forming good character. There is perhaps a little too much effort to convey the truth, which Rabindranath mildly objected to. If you think about the extravagance, pomp and coercion of the religious reformation of that time, you have to be surprised and overwhelmed to see the reflection of this secular mind in children's textbooks.[Translated]

— Rabindranath Tagore

== Popularity ==
The book was highly effective is evident from its cut and popularity. From 1855 to Vidyasagar's death (1891), a total of 152 printed editions of Barnaparichay Part I were published in a total of 35 years. 88 thousand copies were printed in 11 editions in the first three years. To curb the reader's curiosity, the first edition of this book was printed in 3 thousand copies. This number should be enough for those times. 33 lakh 60 thousand copies of this book were printed in 127 editions in 23 years from 1867 to 1890. That is, at this time, an average of 1 lakh 40 thousand copies of this book were printed annually. Needless to say, this cut or increase in popularity has a direct relationship with the spread of education.

== See also ==
- Bengali Alphabet
- Bengali Renaissance
- Ishwar Chandra Vidyasagar
- History of Bengali alphabets
