= Jagadanandapur =

- Census Town
- Location in West Bengal, India Jagadanandapur (India)
- Coordinates: 23.61441°N 88.39683°E
- Country: India
- State: West Bengal
- District: Nadia

Population (2011)
  - Total: 23,822

Languages
  - Official: Bengali, English
- Time zone: UTC+5:30 (IST)
- Vehicle registration: WB
- Website: nadia.nic.in

Jagadanandapur is a census town in the Nakashipara CD block in the Krishnanagar Sadar subdivision of the Nadia district in the Indian state of West Bengal, and the town is part of Bethuadahari 1 G.P.

== Geography ==
Cities and towns in Krishnanagr Sadar subdivision of Nadia district
M: municipal town/ city, CT: census town, R: rural/ urban centre, H: place of historical/ religious interest, T: place of tourist interest.
Owing to space constraints in the small map, the actual locations in a larger map may vary slightly

=== Location ===
Jagadanandapur is located at 23.61441°N 88.39683°E.

Jagadanandapur and Kshidirpur are shown as adjacent census towns in the map of Nakashipara CD block in the District Census Handbook, Nadia.

=== Area overview ===
Nadia district is mostly alluvial plains lying to the east of Hooghly River, locally known as Bhagirathi. The alluvial plains are cut across by such distributaries as Jalangi, Churni and Ichhamati. With these rivers getting silted up, floods are a recurring feature. The Krishnanagar Sadar subdivision, presented in the map alongside, has the Bhagirathi on the west, with Purba Bardhaman district lying across the river. The long stretch along the Bhagirathi has many swamps. The area between the Bhagirathi and the Jalangi, which flows through the middle of the subdivision, is known as Kalantar, a low-lying tract of black clay soil. A big part of the subdivision forms the Krishnanagar-Santipur Plain, which occupies the central part of the district. The Jalangi, after flowing through the middle of the subdivision, turns right and joins the Bhagirathi. On the south-east, the Churni separates the Krishnanagar-Santipur Plain from the Ranaghat-Chakdaha Plain. The east forms the boundary with Bangladesh. The subdivision is moderately urbanized. 20.795% of the population lives in urban areas and 79.205% lives in rural areas.

Note: The map alongside presents some of the notable locations in the subdivision. All places marked in the map are linked in the larger full screen map. All the four subdivisions are presented with maps on the same scale – the size of the maps vary as per the area of the subdivision.

== Demographics ==
According to the 2011 Census of India, Jagadanadapur had a total population of 23,822, of which 12,098 (51%) were males and 11,724 (49%) were females. Population in the age range 0–6 years was 1,879. The total number of literate persons in Jagadanandapur was 18,950 (86.36% of the population over 6 years).

As of 2001 India census, Jagadanandapur had a population of 20,470. Males constitute 51% of the population and females 49%. Jagadanandapur has an average literacy rate of 76%, higher than the national average of 59.5%: male literacy is 81%, and female literacy is 71%. In Jagadanandapur, 10% of the population is under 6 years of age.

== Infrastructure ==
According to the District Census Handbook 2011, Nadia, Jagadanandapur covered an area of 3.93 km^{2}. Among the civic amenities, the protected water supply involved BWT, hand pumps, tubewell, borewell. It had 2,340 domestic electric connections. Among the medical facilities it had 1 dispensary/ health centre, 1 family welfare centre, 1 maternity and child welfare centre, 1 maternity home, 1 veterinary hospital, 12 medicine shop. Among the educational facilities it had were 3 primary schools, 2 middle schools, 2 secondary schools, 2 senior secondary schools. Among the social, recreational and cultural facilities it had 1 cinema theatre, 1 public library, 1 reading room.
