= Santanu Dey =

Indian politician in West Bengal

Member of the West Bengal Legislative Assembly
- Incumbent
- Assumed office 4 May 2026
- Preceded by: Kallol Khan
- Constituency: Nakashipara

Personal details
- Party: Bharatiya Janata Party
- Spouse: Manasi Dey
- Children: Anurag Dey
- Parent: Dhiren Dey
- Occupation: Business
- Profession: Politician

Santanu Dey (Bengali: শান্তনু দে) is an Indian politician from Nadia district of West Bengal. He is a member of West Bengal Legislative Assembly, from Nakashipara Assembly constituency. He is a member of Bharatiya Janata Party.

== Early life and education ==
Dey is from Nadia district of West Bengal. His qualification is Higher Secondary Examination passed from Bethuadahari J.C.M High School under West Bengal Council of Higher Secondary Education in the year 1988.

== Political career ==
He is a member of West Bengal Legislative Assembly, from Nakashipara Assembly constituency. He is an active member of Bharatiya Janata Party. He also contested 2021 West Bengal Legislative Assembly election for the said constituency but lost the election to Kallol Khan.

=== Electoral performance ===
West Bengal Legislative Assembly
Year	Constituency	Party	Votes	%	Opponent	Party	Votes	%	Margin	Result
2021	Nakashipara	BJP	83,541	39.86	Kallol Khan	AITC	104,812	50.01	21,271	Lost
2026	Nakashipara	BJP	1,00,600	48.85	Kallol Khan	AITC	83,273	40.44	17,327	Won

== See also ==
- List of chief ministers of West Bengal
- 18th West Bengal Assembly
