= Dhano Dhanye Express =

Train in India

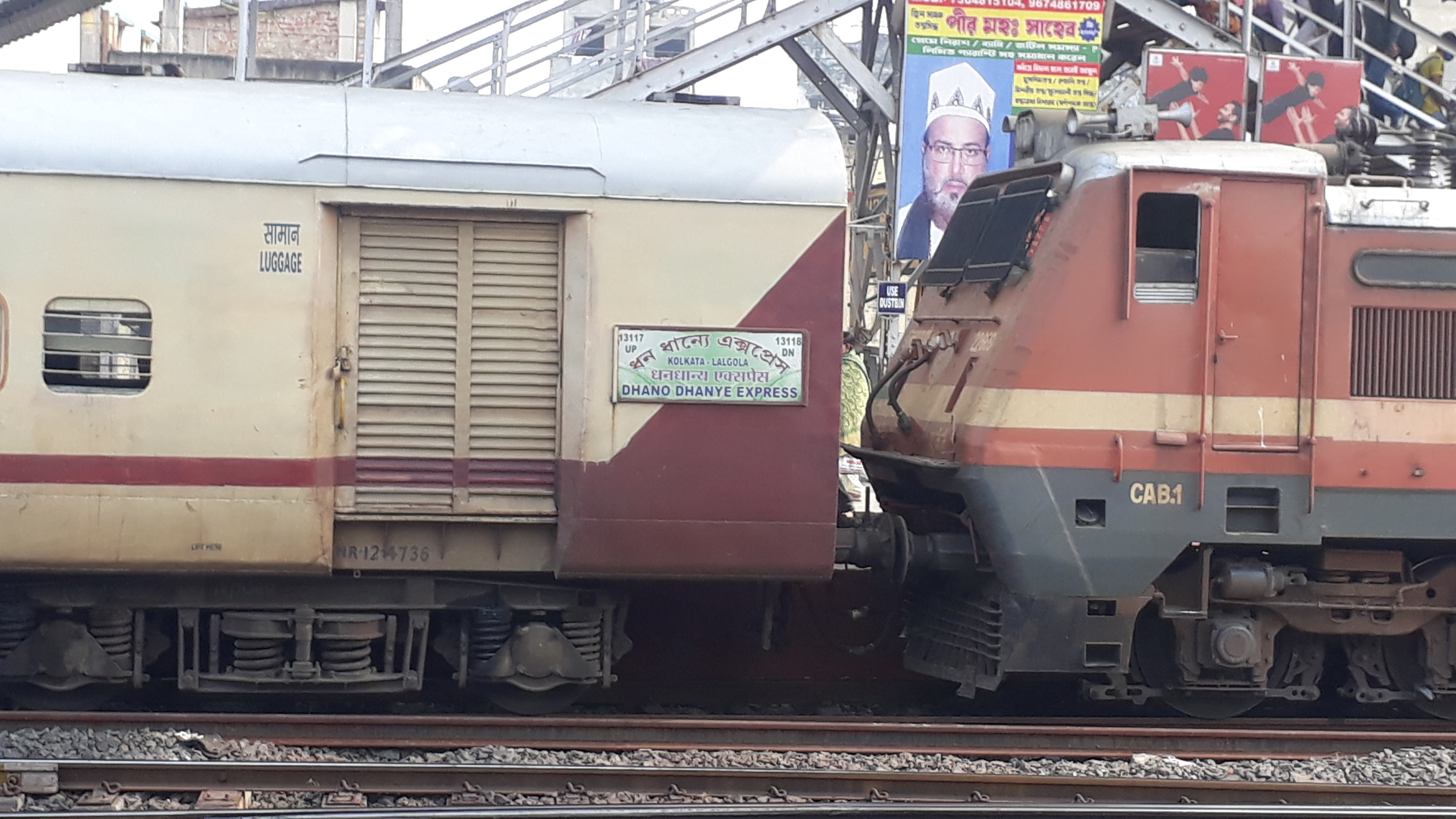
- Dhano Dhanye Express with WAP-4 locomotive.

Overview
- Service type: Express
- Locale: West Bengal
- Current operator(s): Eastern Railway

Route
- Termini: Kolkata (KOAA); Lalgola (LGL)
- Stops: 9
- Distance travelled: 224 km (139 mi)
- Average journey time: 4 hours 15 minutes
- Service frequency: 4 days a week
- Train number(s): 13117 / 13118

On-board services
- Class(es): Chair Car, Second Class Seating, General Unreserved
- Seating arrangements: Yes
- Sleeping arrangements: No
- Auto-rack arrangements: Overhead racks
- Catering facilities: On-board catering, E-catering
- Observation facilities: Large windows
- Baggage facilities: Available
- Other facilities: Below the seats

Technical
- Rolling stock: ICF coach
- Track gauge: 1,676 mm (5 ft 6 in)
- Operating speed: 54 km/h (34 mph) average including halts.
Route map
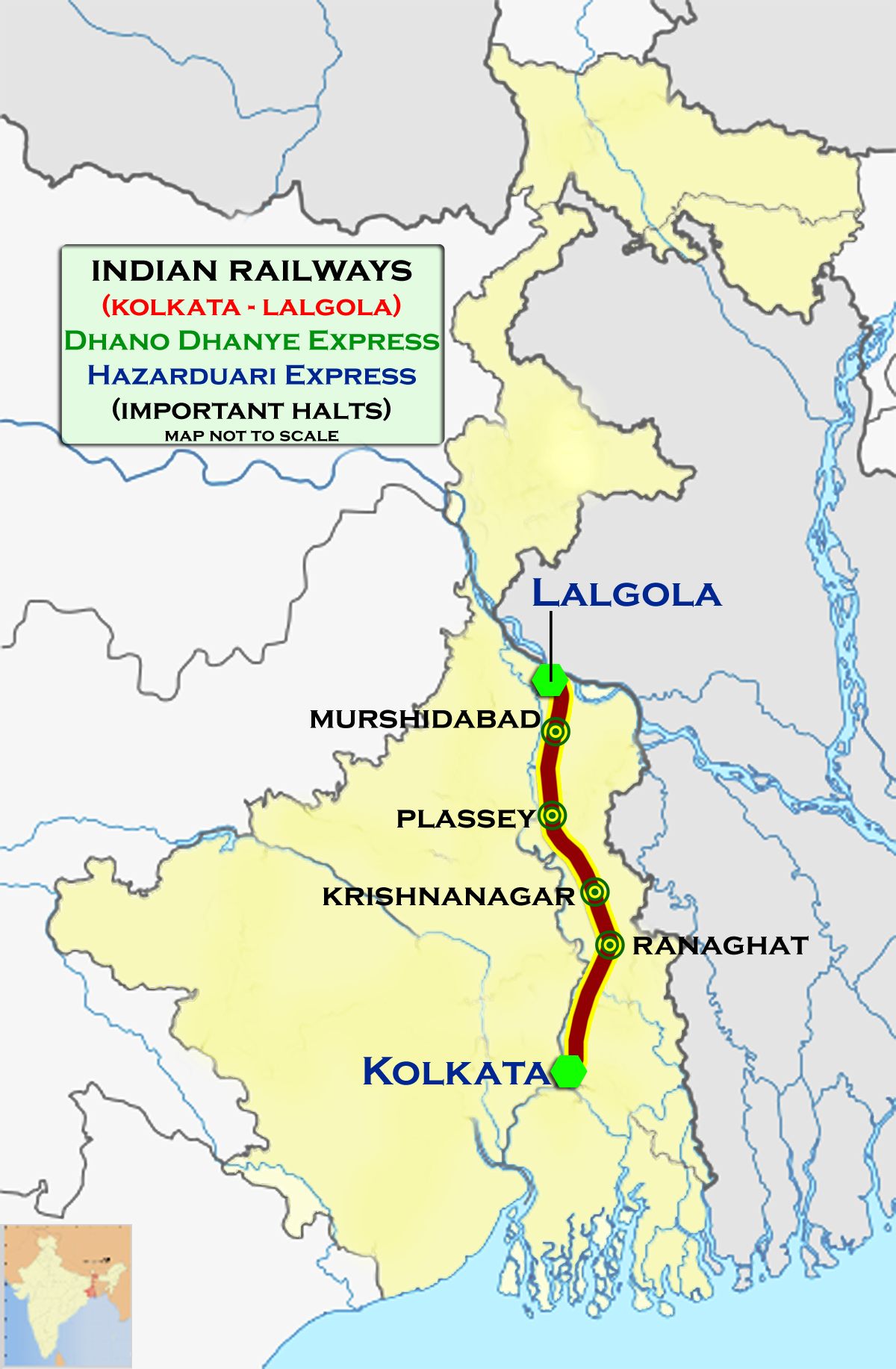

The 13117 / 13118 Dhano Dhanye Express is an express type train of Indian Railways linking Kolkata with the Murshidabad district in the state of West Bengal.This train operates four days a week. Being a short-distance running express, it covers its journey within a day. This train was initially commissioned up to Berhampore Court and was extended to Lalgola later. It covers 224 kilometers of distance at a speed of 54.2 km/h making it the fastest train on Sealdah-Lalgola line.

== Service ==
The 13117/Dhano Dhanye Express has an average speed of 47 km/h and covers 223 km in 4h 50 minutes. The 13118/Dhano Dhanye Express has an average speed of 47 km/h and covers 223 km in 4h 50 minutes.

== Coach composition ==
The train has standard ICF coach with max speed of 110 kmph. The train consists of 11 coaches:

- 2 2nd Seating (D1, D2)
- 1 Chair car (C1)
- 9 General (GN)
- 2 Generators cum luggage/parcel van

== Routing ==
The train runs from Kolkata via Naihati, Ranaghat, Krishnanagar City, Bethuadahari, Plassey, Beldanga, Berhampore Court, Murshidabad, Jiaganj to Lalgola.

== Timings ==
- 13117 Dhanodhanya express leaves Kolkata Railway station at 4:10 pm afternoon on Tuesdays, Thursdays, Fridays and Sundays, and reaches Lalgola same day at 8:55 pm same day. It reaches Jiaganj at 8:01 pm, Murshidabad station at 7:53 pm, Berhampore Court Station at 7:40 pm, Beldanga at 7:19 pm, Plassey at 7:00 pm, Bethuadahari at 6:41 pm, Krishnanagar at 6:18 pm, Ranaghat at 5:45 pm, Naihati at 4:56 pm.
- 13118 Dhanodhanya express departs Lalgola at 7:00 am in morning on Mondays, Wednesdays, Fridays and Saturdays via Jiaganj (7:20 am), Murshidabad (at 7:28 am), Behampore Court (at 7:45 am), Beldanga (at 8:01 am), Plassey (8:16 am), Bethuadahari (at 8:37 am), Krishnanagar (9:20 am), Ranaghat (10:00 am), Naihati (10:40 am) and reaches Kolkata railway station at 11:35 am the same day.

== Notes ==
Seating arrangement is available.
