= Bethuadahari railway station =

Railway station in West Bengal, India

BETHUADAHARI বেথুয়াডহরী बेथुआडहरी
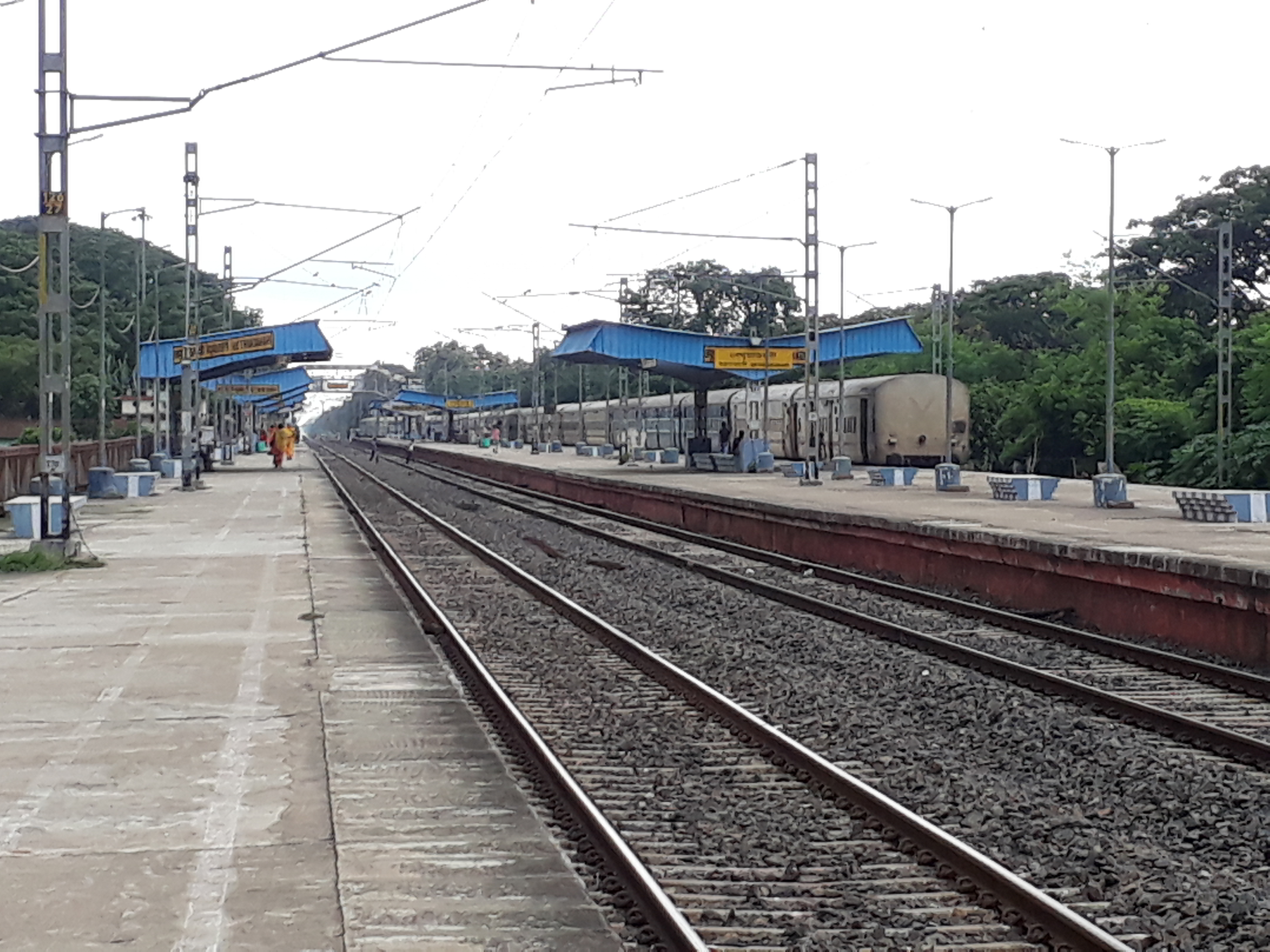
- Bethuadahari station

General information
- Location: N.H 34, Bethuadahari, Nadia, West Bengal; India
- Coordinates: 23.610938°N 88.384950°E
- Elevation: 18 M
- System: Suburban train station
- Owner: Indian Railways
- Operator: Eastern Railway
- Line: Krishnanagar–Lalgola line
- Platforms: 3
- Tracks: 3
- Connections: Kolkata-Siliguri Route New NH-12; Bethuadahari Bus Stand; Patuli Ferry Ghat; Birpur Ferry Ghat; Agradwip Ghat

Construction
- Structure type: Model
- Parking: Available
- Cycle facilities: Available
- Accessible: Not available

Other information
- Status: Functioning
- Station code: BTY
- Zone(s): Eastern Railway
- Division(s): Sealdah

History
- Opened: 1905
- Rebuilt: 2007,2023
- Electrified: Yes (December, 2007)
- Former names: East Indian Railway Company

Passengers
- 20K/day (▲ medium)

Services
Preceding station	Kolkata Suburban Railway	Following station
Muragacha towards Sealdah	Eastern Line Krishnanagar–Lalgola line	Sonadanga towards Lalgola

Other services
Route map
Location
- Location within West Bengal Location within India

Bethuadahari railway station is a rural Indian railway station of the Sealdah–Ranaghat–Lalgola branch line in Eastern Railway zone. The station situated in Nadia district in the Indian state of West Bengal. It serves Bethuadahari, Nakashipara and the surrounding areas. Few passengers, EMU and Express trains pass over the railway station.

== History ==
Initially the Calcutta (Sealdah)-Kusthia line of Eastern Bengal Railway was opened to traffic in 1862. The Ranaghat–Lalgola branch line was established in 1905 as an extension of Sealdah–Ranaghat line. This railway station situated at Bethudahari town. The rail distance between Bethuadahari and Sealdah is 126 km. (96 miles). After the electrification and inauguration of double track by the Indian Railways, this Station was modified and reconstructed into three platforms.

== Sanctuary ==
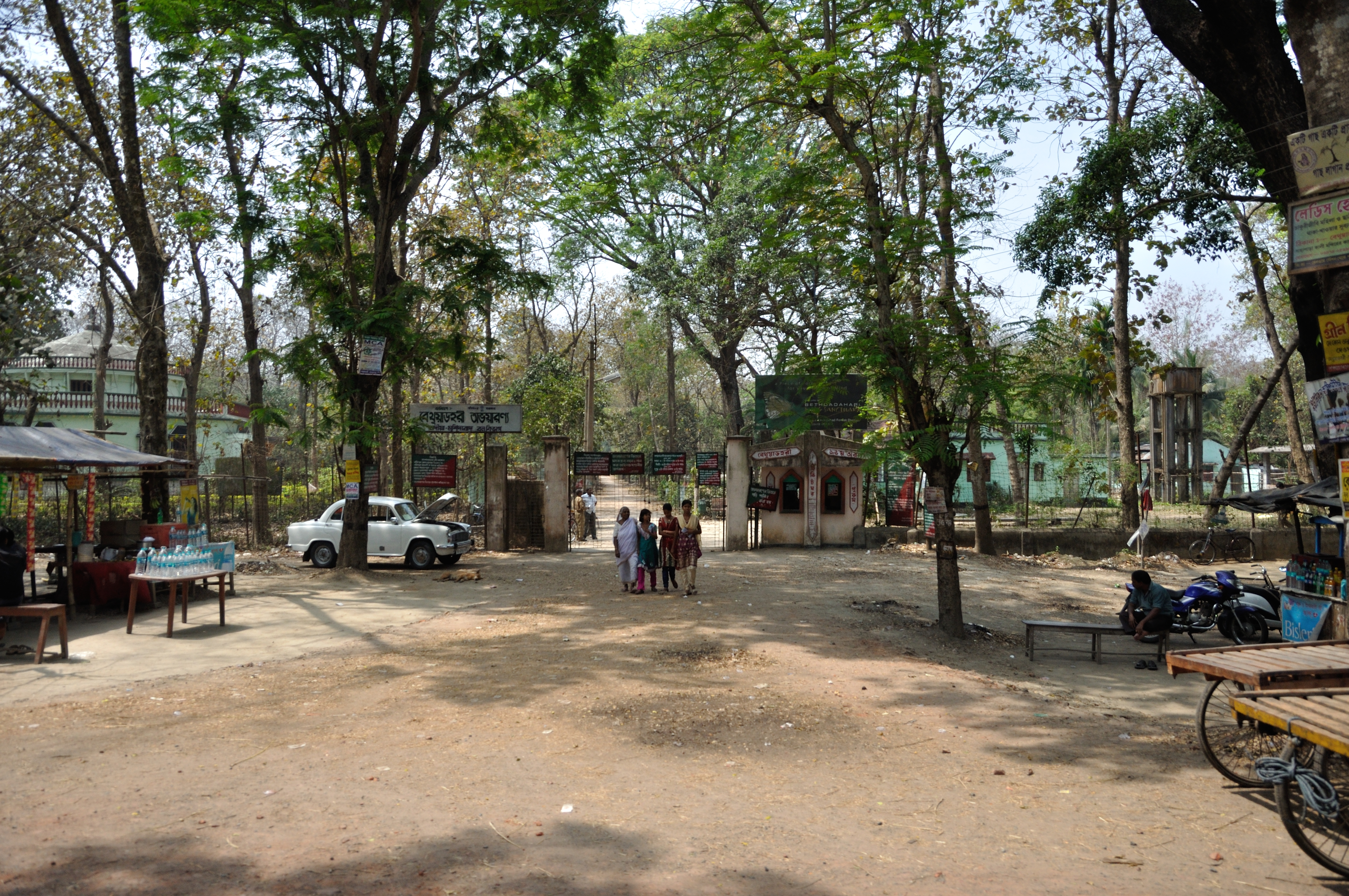
Bethuadahari Wildlife Sanctuary

The nearby reserve forest is known mainly for python and deer. Bethuadahari Avayaranya or Bethuadahari Wildlife Sanctuary is very important tourist spot of the state. It is famous for insemination of deer. The sanctuary covers 67 hectares (170 acres), and was established in 1980 to preserve a portion of the central Gangetic alluvial ecozone. There is a sugarcane laboratory in front of the local Block Development Office.

== Platforms ==
=== Platform 1 ===
Platform 1 mostly handles trains in the Up Sealdah Main Line sections. It also handles a few trains in the Up Sealdah-Lalgola Passenger, Ranaghat-Lalgola Passenger, Kolkata- Lalgola Hazarduari Express, Dhano Dhanye Express and Bhagirathi Express

=== Platform 2 ===
Platform 2 only handles Down Lalgola bound trains in the Sealdah-Main Line section and almost all trains from Ranaghat and Krishnanagar City and a few from the Lalgola-Sealdah section.

=== Platform 3 ===
Platform 3 mostly handles Up for goods train

== Trains ==
22 trains pass through this station. Lalgola Passengers, Hazarduari Express, Dhano Dhanye Express and Bhagirathi Express stop there.

== Electrification ==
The Krishnanagar – Lalgola Section has been electrified on the 2010.

== See also ==
- Transport in India
- Rail transport in India
- RapidX
- PM Gati Shakti
