= Bilwagram =

Village in West Bengal, India

- village
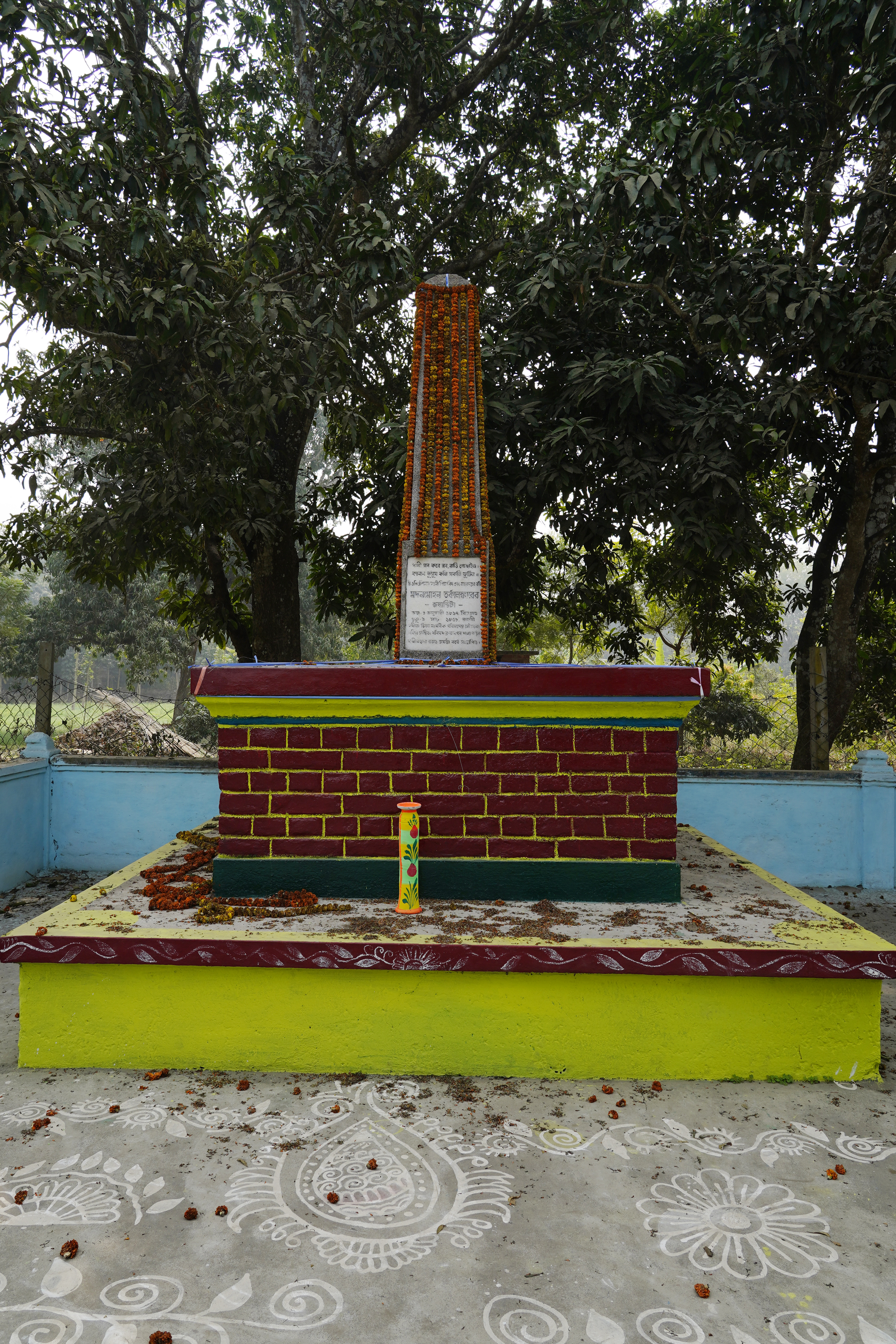
- Memorial of Madanmohan Tarkalankar at Bilwagram

- Location within West Bengal
- Coordinates: 23°34′39″N 88°22′36″E
- Country: India
- State: West Bengal
- District: Nadia
- Block: Nakashipara

Area
  - Total: 616.34 ha (1,523.0 acres)

Population (2011)
  - Total: 5,853
  - Density: 949.6/km^{2} (2,460/sq mi)

Bilwagram is a village in Nakashipara block, Nadia district, West Bengal, India. It has a population of 5853. Madanmohan Tarkalankar, who was a Sanskrit scholar, Bengali writer a pioneer of the Bengali renaissance, was born in the village.
