= Dhubulia railway station =

Railway station in West Bengal, India

Dhubulia
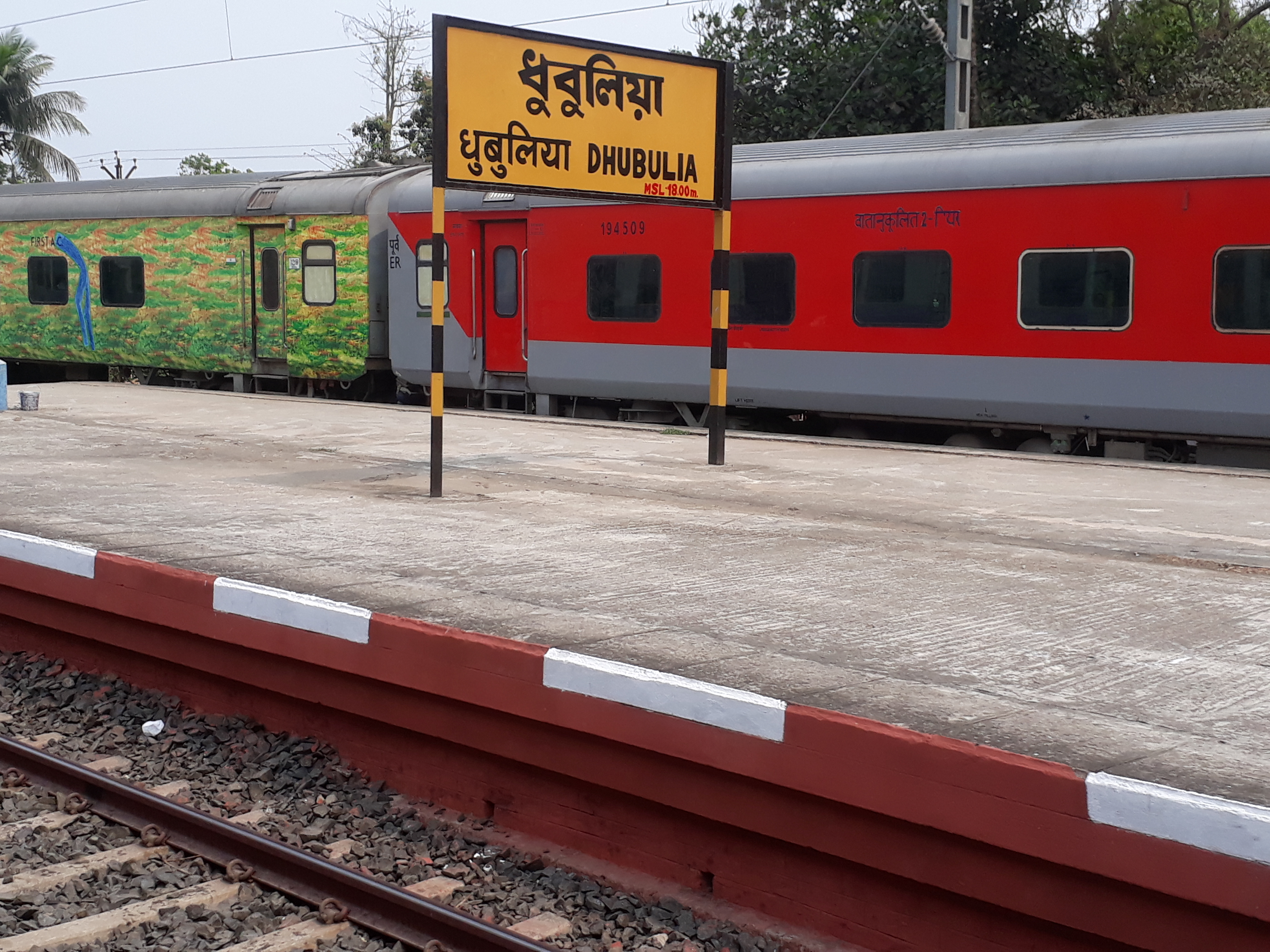

General information
- Location: Dhubulia Station Road, Dhubulia, Nadia district, West Bengal; India
- Coordinates: 23.485685°N 88.440545°E
- System: Kolkata Suburban Railway station
- Owner: Indian Railways
- Operator: Eastern Railway
- Line: Krishnanagar–Lalgola line
- Platforms: 3
- Tracks: 2

Construction
- Structure type: At grade
- Parking: Not available
- Cycle facilities: Not available
- Accessible: Not available

Other information
- Status: Functional
- Station code: DHU
- Zone(s): Eastern Railway
- Division(s): Sealdah

History
- Opened: 1905
- Electrified: 2007

Services
Preceding station	Kolkata Suburban Railway	Following station
Bahadurpur towards Krishnanagar City Junction	Eastern Line Krishnanagar–Lalgola line	Muragacha towards Lalgola
Route map
Location
- Location within West Bengal Location within India

Dhubulia railway station is a railway station under the Sealdah railway division of Eastern Railway system. It is situated in Dhubulia, on the Krishnanagar–Lalgola lines in Nadia district in the Indian state of West Bengal. Few EMU and Lalgola passenger trains pass through Dhubulia railway station.

== Electrification ==
The 128 km long Krishnanagar–Lalgola stretch, including Dhubulia railway station, was electrified in 2007 for EMU services
