= Kallol Khan =

Indian politician

Kallol Khan (born 1954) is an Indian politician from West Bengal. He is a member of the West Bengal Legislative Assembly from Nakashipara Assembly constituency in Nadia district. He won the 2021 West Bengal Legislative Assembly election representing the Trinamool Congress party.

== Early life and education ==
Khan is from Nakashipara, Nadia district, West Bengal. He is the son of late Chittaranjan Khan. He studied Class 12 at Muragachha High School and passed the Higher Secondary examinations (old) in 1970.

== Career ==
Khan won from Nakashipara Assembly constituency representing the All India Trinamool Congress in the 2021 West Bengal Legislative Assembly election. He polled 104,812 votes and defeated his nearest rival, Santanu Dey of the Bharatiya Janata Party, by a margin of 21,271 votes. he first became an MLA winning the 2001 West Bengal Legislative Assembly election and retained the seat for Trinamool Congress in the 2006 and 2011 Assembly elections. He won for the fourth time in the 2016 West Bengal Legislative Assembly election defeating Tanmay Ganguli of the Communist Party of India (Marxist) by a margin of 6,250 votes. In 2021, he was elected for the fifth successive term, again on Trinamool Congress ticket.
