= Bethuadahari Wildlife Sanctuary =

Wildlife sanctuary in West Bengal, India

- IUCN category IV (habitat/species management area)
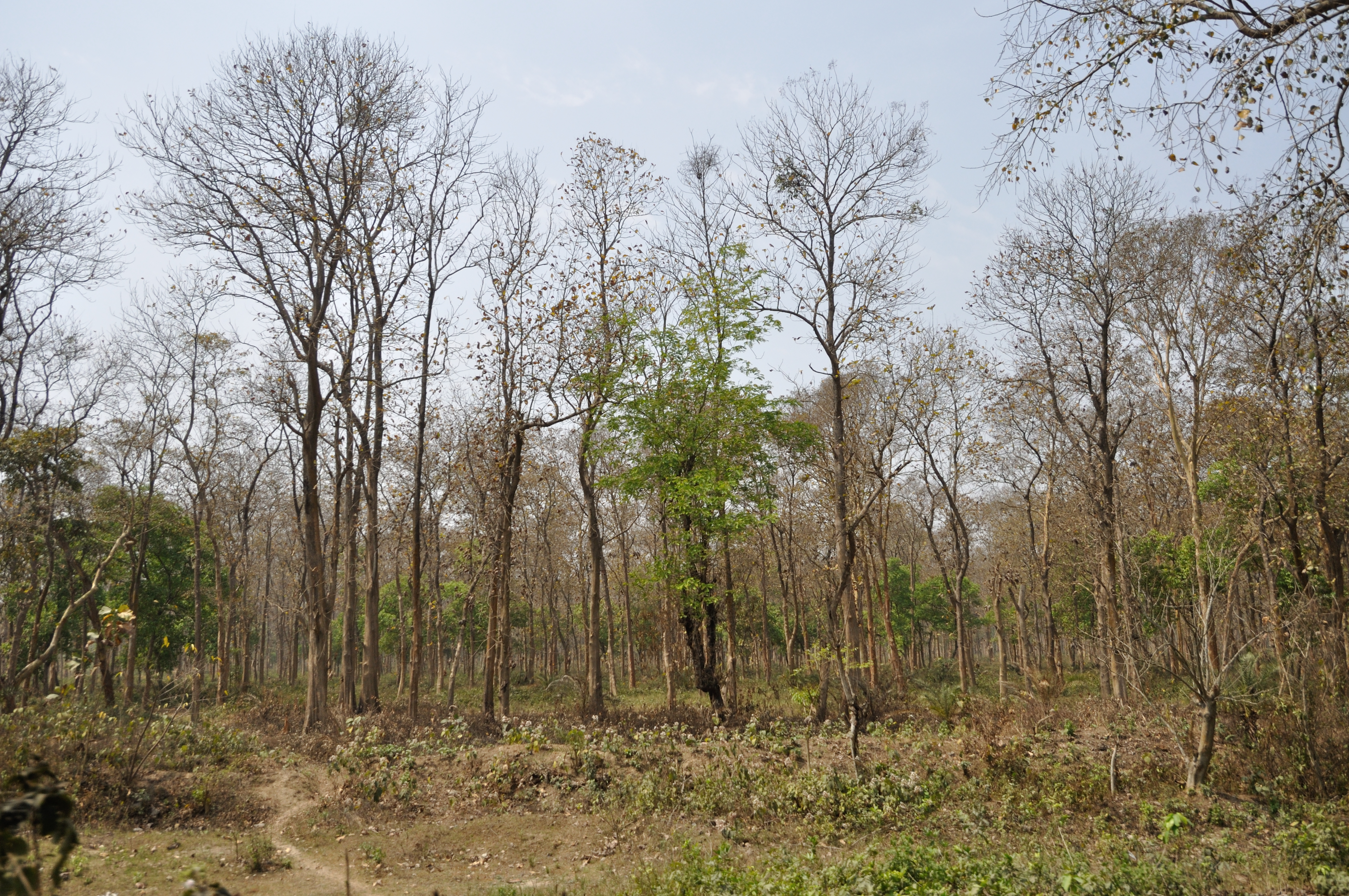

- Location within West Bengal Location within India
- Interactive map of Bethuadahari Wildlife Sanctuary
- Location: Bethuadahari, Nadia District, West Bengal, India
- Nearest city: Bethuadahari
- Coordinates: 23.5975516°N 88.3920227°E
- Area: 67 hectares (170 acres)

Bethuadahari Wildlife Sanctuary is situated in the Bethuadahari town (Nakashipara area) of Nadia District, West Bengal, India. The sanctuary is located beside National Highway 12 (old no NH 34). The sanctuary covers 67 hectares, and was established in 1980 to preserve a portion of the central Gangetic alluvial zone.

== Geography ==
Bethuadahari Wildlife Sanctuary is located at 23.5975516°N 88.3920227°E.

== Flora and fauna ==
Trees species in Bethuadahari Wildlife Sanctuary include Shorea robusta, teak, Terminalia arjuna, Dalbergia sissoo, and bamboo. It has a large population of chital, golden jackal, Bengal fox, porcupine, Asian palm civet, jungle cat, small civet cat, Indian hare and Northern plains gray langur. Bird species include rose-ringed parakeet, plum-headed parakeet, Alexandrine parakeet, Red-breasted parakeet, barn owls, spotted owlet, brown fish owl, scops owl, Indian cuckoo, barbets and other smaller birds. Reptiles are represented by Indian cobra, monocled cobra, Russell's viper, common krait, banded krait, common cat snake, Oxybelis fulgidus, rainbow mud snake, ornate flying snake, copper headed trinket, Indian rat snake, buff striped keelback, checkered keelback, common wolf snake, Lycodon jara, Oligodon arnensis, Eryx johnii, Vipera ammodytes; monitor lizards and the gharial.
