= Kshidirpur =

- Location in West Bengal, India Kshidirpur (India)
- Coordinates: 23.60741°N 88.40183°E
- Country: India
- State: West Bengal
- District: Nadia

Population (2011)
  - Total: 10,556

Languages
  - Official: Bengali, English
- Time zone: UTC+5:30 (IST)
- Vehicle registration: WB
- Website: nadia.nic.in

Kshidirpur in the Nakashipara CD block in the Krishnanagar Sadar subdivision of the Nadia district in the Indian state of West Bengal.

== Geography ==
Cities and towns in Krishnanagr Sadar subdivision of Nadia district
M: municipal town/ city, CT: census town, R: rural/ urban centre, H: place of historical/ religious interest, T: place of tourist interest.
Owing to space constraints in the small map, the actual locations in a larger map may vary slightly

=== Location ===
Kshidirpur is located at 23°36′27″N 88°24′07″E

Kshdirpur and Jagadanandapur are shown as adjacent census towns in the map of Nakashipara CD block in the District Census Handbook, Nadia.

=== Area overview ===
Nadia district is mostly alluvial plains lying to the east of Hooghly River, locally known as Bhagirathi. The alluvial plains are cut across by such distributaries as Jalangi, Churni and Ichhamati. With these rivers getting silted up, floods are a recurring feature. The Krishnanagar Sadar subdivision, presented in the map alongside, has the Bhagirathi on the west, with Purba Bardhaman district lying across the river. The long stretch along the Bhagirathi has many swamps. The area between the Bhagirathi and the Jalangi, which flows through the middle of the subdivision, is known as Kalantar, a low-lying tract of black clay soil. A big part of the subdivision forms the Krishnanagar-Santipur Plain, which occupies the central part of the district. The Jalangi, after flowing through the middle of the subdivision, turns right and joins the Bhagirathi. On the south-east, the Churni separates the Krishnanagar-Santipur Plain from the Ranaghat-Chakdaha Plain. The east forms the boundary with Bangladesh. The subdivision is moderately urbanised. 20.795% of the population lives in urban areas and 79.205% lives in rural areas.

Note: The map alongside presents some of the notable locations in the subdivision. All places marked in the map are linked in the larger full screen map. All the four subdivisions are presented with maps on the same scale – the size of the maps vary as per the area of the subdivision.

== Demographics ==
According to the 2011 Census of India, Kshidirpur had a total population of 10,556, of which 5,429 (51%) were males and 5,127 (49%) were females. Population in the age range 0–6 years was 899. The total number of literate persons in Kshidirpur was 8,181 (84.72% of the population over 6 years).

As of 2001 India census, Kshidirpur had a population of 9,065. Males constitute 52% of the population and females 48%. Kshidirpur has an average literacy rate of 72%, higher than the national average of 59.5%: male literacy is 77%, and female literacy is 66%. In Kshidirpur, 11% of the population is under 6 years of age.

== Infrastructure ==
According to the District Census Handbook 2011, Nadia, Bethuadahari, Kshidirpur covered an area of 2.52 km^{2}. Among the civic amenities, the protected water supply involved BWT, hand pumps, tubewell, borewell. It had 1,034 domestic electric connections. Among the medical facilities it had 1 nursing home, 1 veterinary hospital. Among the educational facilities it had were 2 primary schools, 1 secondary school, 1 senior secondary school.
