= Common wolf snake =

There are three species of snake named common wolf snake:

- Lycodon aulicus
- Lycodon capucinus
- Lycodon solivagus
