= Sonadanga railway station =

Railway station in West Bengal, India

Sonadanga
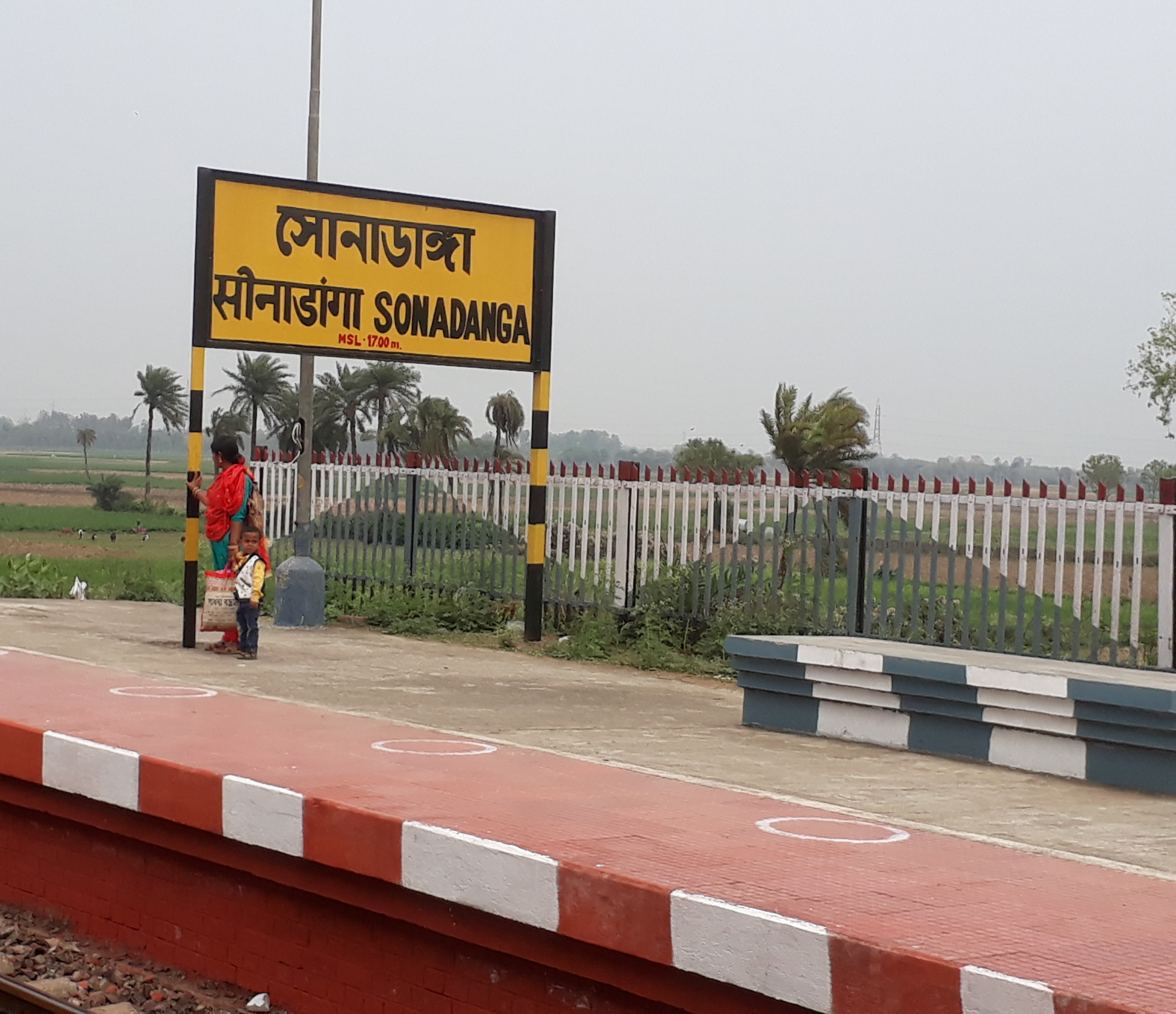

General information
- Location: Sonadanga, Bikrampur, Nadia, West Bengal; India
- Coordinates: 23°38′16″N 88°21′13″E
- Elevation: 17 m (56 ft)
- System: Kolkata Suburban Railway station
- Owner: Indian Railways
- Operator: Eastern Railway
- Line: Krishnanagar–Lalgola line
- Platforms: 2
- Tracks: 2

Construction
- Structure type: At grade
- Parking: Not available
- Cycle facilities: Not available
- Accessible: Not available

Other information
- Status: Functional
- Station code: SVH
- Zone(s): Eastern Railway
- Division(s): Sealdah

History
- Opened: 1905
- Electrified: 2010

Services
Preceding station	Kolkata Suburban Railway	Following station
Bethuadahari towards Krishnanagar City Junction	Eastern Line Krishnanagar–Lalgola line	Debagram towards Lalgola
Route map
Location
- Location within West Bengal Location within India

Sonadanga railway station is a railway station under Sealdah railway division of Eastern Railway system. It is situated in besides National Highway 34 at Sonadanga village on the Lalgola and Gede branch lines in Nadia district in the Indian state of West Bengal. The distance between Sealdah and Sonadanga is 134 km. Few EMU and Lalgola passengers trains are passing through Sonadanga railway station. It serves Nakashipara and the surrounding areas.

== Electrification ==
The 128 km long Krishnanagar–Lalgola stretch including Sonadanga railway station was electrified in 2010 for EMU services.
