= Muragacha railway station =

Railway station in West Bengal, India

Muragacha
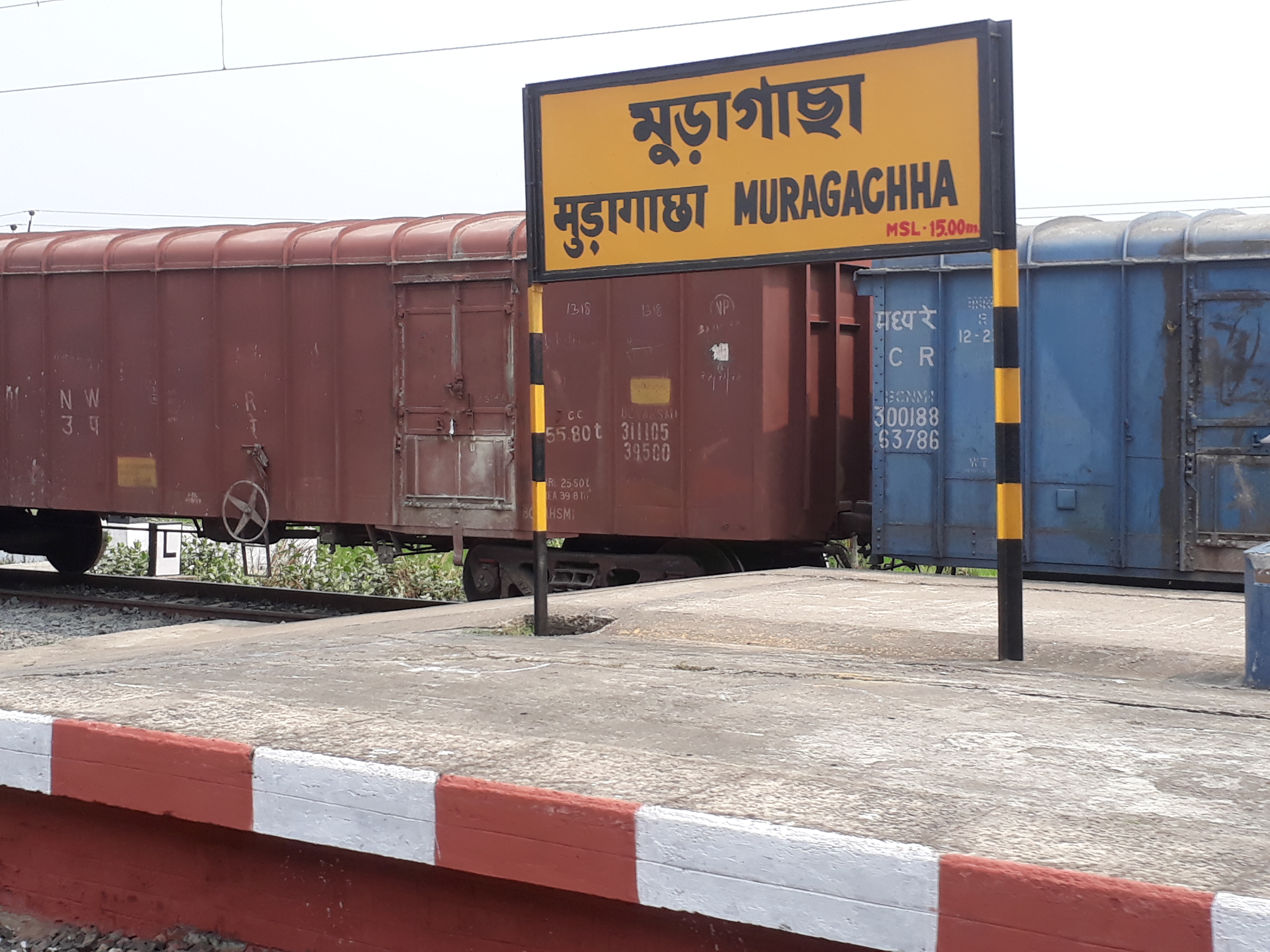

General information
- Location: Muragacha, Nadia district, West Bengal; India
- Coordinates: 23°31′47″N 88°25′16″E
- System: Kolkata Suburban Railway station
- Owner: Indian Railways
- Operator: Eastern Railway
- Line: Krishnanagar–Lalgola line
- Platforms: 3
- Tracks: 2

Construction
- Structure type: At grade
- Parking: Not available
- Cycle facilities: Not available
- Accessible: Not available

Other information
- Status: Functional
- Station code: MGM
- Zone(s): Eastern Railway
- Division(s): Sealdah

History
- Opened: 1905
- Electrified: 2007

Services
Preceding station	Kolkata Suburban Railway	Following station
Dhubulia towards Krishnanagar City Junction	Eastern Line Krishnanagar–Lalgola line	Bethuadahari towards Lalgola
Route map
Location
- Location within West Bengal Location within India

Muragacha railway station is a railway station under Sealdah railway division of Eastern Railway system. It is situated beside Nakashipara Road in Muragacha on the Krishnanagar–Lalgola lines in Nadia in the Indian state of West Bengal. The distance between Sealdah and Muragacha is 117 km. Few EMU and Lalgola passengers trains are passing through Muragacha railway station.

== Electrification ==
The 128 km long Krishnanagar–Lalgola stretch including Muragacha railway station was electrified in 2007 for EMU services.
