= Biharilal Sarkar =

Indian writer

Rai Sahib Biharilal Sarkar
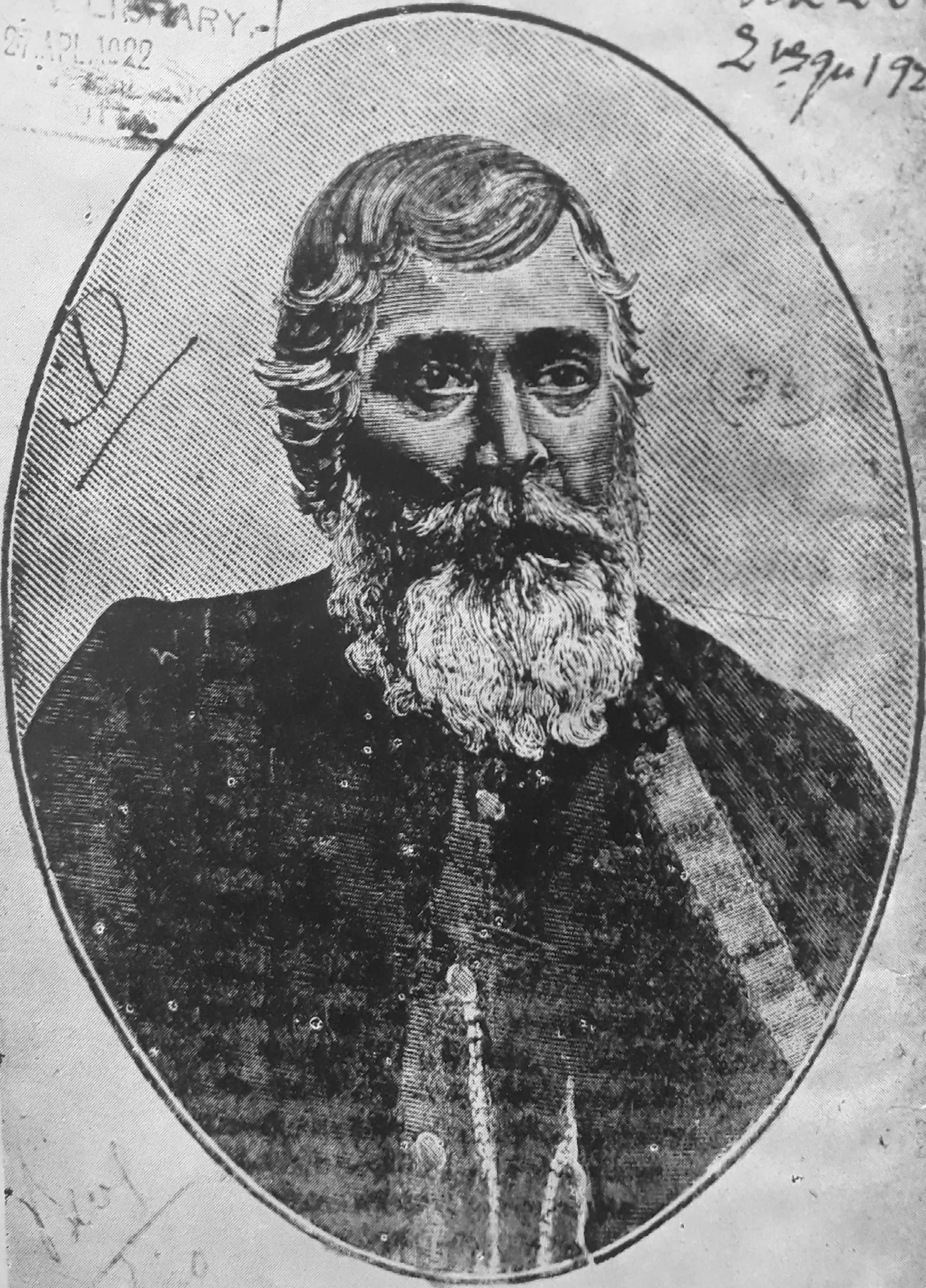
- Biharilal Sarkar in the photograph of his book Titumir (1897)
- Born: 18 October 1855
- Died: 1921 (9 Phalgun, 1328 Bangabda); Varanasi
- Occupations: Editor; Historian; Writer
- Writing career
- Notable works: Bange Borgi; Bharatpur Judhdho; Bidyasagar; Maharani Swarnamayee; Shakuntala Rahasya; Titumir

Biharilal Sarkar (18 October 1855 - 1921) was an Indian Bengali editor, historian and writer. He is known for his book Titumir.

== Life ==
Biharilal was born in Howrah District's Andul in 1855. His father's name was Umacharan Sarkar. He read up to F.A. in Calcutta General Assemblies Institution (now Scottish Church College) and worked as Press-Inspector in Calcutta Press. He also worked for 30 years in the editorial department of "Bangabasi" newspaper. He is known as the biographer of Vidyasagar. He also practised musical instruments. For Bangabasi magazine, he got Rai Sahib on 3 June 1915. He died in 1921 in Varanasi (9 Phalgun, 1328 Bangabda).
