= Nakashipara Assembly constituency =

Nakashipara
- Constituency No. 81 for the West Bengal Legislative Assembly
- Interactive Map Outlining Nakashipara Assembly Constituency

Constituency details
- Country: India
- Region: East India
- State: West Bengal
- District: Nadia
- Lok Sabha constituency: Krishnanagar
- Established: 1951
- Total electors: 247,691
- Reservation: None

Member of Legislative Assembly
- 18th West Bengal Legislative Assembly
- Incumbent Shantanu Dey
- Party: BJP
- Alliance: NDA
- Elected year: 2026

Nakashipara Assembly constituency is an assembly constituency in Nadia district in the Indian state of West Bengal.

== Overview ==
As per orders of the Delimitation Commission, No. 81 Nakashipara Assembly constituency is composed of the following: Bethuadahari I and Bethuadahari II, Billwa Gram, Birpur I, Birpur II, Dharmada, Dogachhia, Majher Gram, Muragachha, Nakasipara and Patikabari gram panchayats of Nakashipara community development block, and Palit Begia and Rajarampur Ghoraikhetra gram panchayats of Kaliganj community development block.

Nakashipara Assembly constituency is part of No. 12 Krishnanagar Lok Sabha constituency.

== Members of the Legislative Assembly ==
Year	Name	Party
1951	Jagannath Majumdar	Indian National Congress
1957	Mahananda Haldar	Indian National Congress
1957	S. M. Fazlur Rahman	Indian National Congress
1962	S. M. Fazlur Rahman	Indian National Congress
1967	M. C. Mondal	Bangla Congress
1969	Nil Kamal Sarkar	Indian National Congress
1971	Govindo Chandra Mondal	Independent politician
1972	Nil Kamal Sarkar	Indian National Congress
1977	Mir Fakir Mohammad	Communist Party of India (Marxist)
1982	Mir Fakir Mohammad	Communist Party of India (Marxist)
1987	Santosh Kumar Sinha	Communist Party of India (Marxist)
1991	Shaikh Khabiruddin Ahmed	Communist Party of India (Marxist)
1996	Shaikh Khabiruddin Ahmed	Communist Party of India (Marxist)
2001	Kallol Khan	Trinamool Congress
2006	Kallol Khan	Trinamool Congress
2011	Kallol Khan	Trinamool Congress
2016	Kallol Khan	Trinamool Congress
2021	Kallol Khan	Trinamool Congress
2026	Shantanu Dey	Bharatiya Janata Party

== Election results ==
Vote share of Winning candidates
2026	48.85%
2021	50.01%
2016	46.56%
2011	48.63%
2006	45.36%
2001	41.69%
1996	43.75%
1991	43.62%
1987	40.72%
1982	52.95%
1977	39.87%
1972	54.99%
1971	26.63%
1969	53.79%
1967	49.96%
1962	55.05%
1957	39.86%
1957	38.64%
1951	45.71%

=== 2026 ===
2026 West Bengal Legislative Assembly election: Nakashipara
Party	Candidate	Votes	%	±%
BJP	Shantanu Dey	100,600	48.85	+8.99
AITC	Kallol Khan	83,273	40.44	−9.57
CPI(M)	Sukla Saha	13,703	6.65	+4.09
INC	Tahir Sekh	3,030	1.47	
NOTA	None of the above	1,873	0.91	+0.36
Majority		17,327	8.41	−1.74
Turnout		205,920	93.86	+9.25
BJP gain from AITC		Swing		

=== 2021 ===
2021 West Bengal Legislative Assembly election: Nakashipara
Party	Candidate	Votes	%	±%
AITC	Kallol Khan	104,812	50.01	
BJP	Shantanu Dey	83,541	39.86	
Independent	Tanmay Ganguli	11,277	5.38	
CPI(M)	Sukla Saha Chakraborty	5,365	2.56	
NOTA	None of the above	1,146	0.55	
Majority		21,271	10.15	
Turnout		209,570	84.61	
AITC hold		Swing		

=== 2016 ===
2016 West Bengal Legislative Assembly election: Nakashipara
Party	Candidate	Votes	%	±%
AITC	Kallol Khan	88,032	46.56	
CPI(M)	Tanmay Ganguli	81,782	43.25	
BJP	Anup Kumar Mondal	12,724	6.73	
CPI(ML)L	Sisir Basak	1,768	0.94	
AMB	Swapan Mondal	1,732	0.92	
NOTA	None of the Above	1,571	0.83	
BSP	Shipankar Haldar	1,476	0.78	
Majority		6,250	3.31	
Turnout		189,085	85.43	
AITC hold		Swing		

=== 2011 ===
2011 West Bengal Legislative Assembly election: Nakashipara
Party	Candidate	Votes	%	±%
AITC	Kallol Khan	79,644	48.63	
CPI(M)	Gayatri Sardar	63,170	38.57	
BJP	Sushil Barman	12,227	7.47	
Independent	Anil Barai	2,993	1.83	
Independent	Pankaj Sarkar	2,795	1.71	
CPI(ML)L	Pradip Dutta Gupta	1,606	0.98	
BSP	Bablu Das	1,330	0.81	
Majority		16,474	10.06	
Turnout		163,765	87.47	
AITC hold		Swing		

=== 2006 ===
2006 West Bengal Legislative Assembly election: Nakashipara
Party	Candidate	Votes	%	±%
AITC	Kallol Khan	63,505	45.36	
CPI(M)	S. M. Saadi	63,095	45.06	
INC	Dhrubajyoti Ghosh	4,091	2.92	
PBRML	Jafarulla Molla	3,504	2.50	
Independent	Aftab Uddin Sk.	3,025	2.16	
CPI(ML)L	Pradip (Kajal) Dutta Gupta	1,599	1.14	
BSP	Samir Sarkar	1,196	0.85	
Majority		410	0.30	
Turnout		140,015		
AITC hold		Swing		

=== 2001 ===
2001 West Bengal Legislative Assembly election: Nakashipara
Party	Candidate	Votes	%	±%
AITC	Kallol Khan	51,301	41.69	
CPI(M)	Sekh Khabir Uddin Ahamed	47,948	38.97	
BJP	Soumendra Nath Mookherjee	19,203	15.61	
Independent	Milan Majumder	2,509	2.04	
CPI(ML)L	Pradip (Kajal) Duttagupta	2,086	1.70	
Majority		3,353	2.72	
Turnout		123,110	79.49	
Swing to AITC from CPI(M)		Swing		

=== 1996 ===
1996 West Bengal Legislative Assembly election: Nakashipara
Party	Candidate	Votes	%	±%
CPI(M)	Shaikh Khabir Uddin Ahmed	54,600	43.75	
INC	Dhrubajyoti Ghosh	53,135	42.57	
BJP	Gouranga Ballav	9,169	7.35	
CPI(ML)L	Biman Biswas	2,431	1.95	
SS	Nani Gopal Das	2,241	1.80	
Independent	Milan Mazumder	1,464	1.17	
Independent	Sajahan Mallick	867	0.69	
BSP	Mondal Sudhangsu	360	0.29	
AIIC(T)	Bose Rekha	216	0.17	
AMB	Sunil Biswas	179	0.14	
Independent	Umesh Chandra Sarker	143	0.11	
Majority		1,465	1.18	
Turnout		127,441	84.84	
CPI(M) hold		Swing		

=== 1991 ===
1991 West Bengal Legislative Assembly election: Nakashipara
Party	Candidate	Votes	%	±%
CPI(M)	Shaik Khabiruddin Ahmed	44,254	43.62	
INC	Kallol Khan	29,348	28.93	
BJP	Subhas Baidya	23,158	22.83	
IPF	Murari Mohan Ghosh	1,743	1.72	
Independent	Korban Ali Shaikh	1,411	1.39	
JP	Shaikh Suxchand	528	0.52	
BSP	Shib Nath Biswas	400	0.39	
AMB	Sinil Biswas	334	0.33	
Independent	Saha Jagabandhu (Jaga)	272	0.27	
Majority		14,906	14.69	
Turnout		103,751	81.55	
CPI(M) hold		Swing		

=== 1987 ===
1987 West Bengal Legislative Assembly election: Nakashipara
Party	Candidate	Votes	%	±%
CPI(M)	Sinha Santosh Kumar	34,721	40.72	
INC	Kallon Khan	26,332	30.88	
Independent	Mir Fakir Mohammed	20,574	24.13	
Independent	Dilip Chunari	1,755	2.06	
SUCI	Shaikh Kurban Ali	1,124	1.32	
Independent	Nil Kamal Sarkar	461	0.54	
Independent	Nirapada Biswas	308	0.36	
Majority		8,389	9.84	
Turnout		86,931	80.43	
CPI(M) hold		Swing		

=== 1982 ===
1982 West Bengal Legislative Assembly election: Nakashipara
Party	Candidate	Votes	%	±%
CPI(M)	Mir Fakir Mohammad	36,766	52.95	
INC	Nil Kamal Sarkar	28,727	41.37	
SUCI	Shaijkh Korban	2,698	3.89	
JP	Amir Chand Shaikh	600	0.86	
Independent	Choudhury Abdus Samad	330	0.48	
Independent	Abul Bashar Mandal	314	0.45	
Majority		8,039	11.58	
Turnout		70,952	82.78	
CPI(M) hold		Swing		

=== 1977 ===
1977 West Bengal Legislative Assembly election: Nakashipara
Party	Candidate	Votes	%	±%
CPI(M)	Mir Fakir Mohammad	17,645	39.87	
JP	S. M. Badaruddin	6,921	15.64	
Independent	Toyadali Mondal	6,189	13.98	
Independent	Sandhya Rani Roy	4,498	10.16	
INC	Nil Kamal Sarkar	3,068	6.93	
Independent	Mritunjoy Singha Roy	2,177	4.92	
Independent	Mrityunjoy De	2,063	4.66	
Independent	Tarakeswar Das	929	2.10	
IUML	Gobinda Chandra Mondal	572	1.29	
Independent	Lakshman Mandal	194	0.44	
Majority		10,724	24.23	
Turnout		45,271	60.67	
Swing to CPI(M) from INC		Swing		

=== 1972 ===
1972 West Bengal Legislative Assembly election: Nakashipara (SC)
Party	Candidate	Votes	%	±%
INC	Nil Kamal Sarker	20,753	54.99	
CPI(M)	Binoy Bhusan Majumder	13,808	36.58	
IUML	Govindo Chandra Mondal	2,821	7.47	
Independent	Kaminikumar Das	361	0.96	
Majority		6,945	18.41	
Turnout		39,038	52.21	
Swing to INC from Independent		Swing		

=== 1971 ===
1971 West Bengal Legislative Assembly election: Nakashipara (SC)
Party	Candidate	Votes	%	±%
Independent	Govindo Chandra Mondal	10,826	26.63	
Independent	Nil Kamal Sarkar	8,414	20.69	
CPI(M)	Harendra Baidya	8,145	20.03	
Bangla Congress	Manindra Chandra Mondal	6,517	16.03	
INC(O)	Hari Sadhan Barman	4,069	10.01	
CPI	Guneswar Maitra	2,688	6.61	
Majority		2,412	5.94	
Turnout		43,963	60.21	
Swing to Independent from INC		Swing		

=== 1969 ===
1969 West Bengal Legislative Assembly election: Nakashipara (SC)
Party	Candidate	Votes	%	±%
INC	Nil Kamal Sarkar	23,482	53.79	
Bangla Congress	Amrita Lal Sarkar	19,356	44.34	
PML	Mondal Gobinda	817	1.87	
Majority		4,126	9.45	
Turnout		44,874	67.47	
Swing to INC from Bangla Congress		Swing		

=== 1967 ===
1967 West Bengal Legislative Assembly election: Nakashipara (SC)
Party	Candidate	Votes	%	±%
Bangla Congress	M. C. Mondal	20,270	49.96	
INC	N. K. Sarkar	15,666	38.61	
Independent	D. Haldar	3,383	8.34	
RPI	N. Sarker	1,253	3.09	
Majority		4,604	11.35	
Turnout		44,498	67.04	
Swing to Bangla Congress from INC		Swing		

=== 1962 ===
1962 West Bengal Legislative Assembly election: Nakashipara
Party	Candidate	Votes	%	±%
INC	S. M. Fazlur Rahman	23,411	55.05	
SBP	Mohadeb Bhattacharya	8,582	20.18	
CPI	Sudhansusekhar Sen	8,392	19.73	
SUCI	Sudhangshu Neogi	1,230	2.89	
ABJS	Naru Gopal Ghose	912	2.14	
Majority		14,829	34.87	
Turnout		44,911	63.78	
INC hold		Swing		

=== 1957 ===
1957 West Bengal Legislative Assembly election: Nakashipara (SC)
Party	Candidate	Votes	%	±%
INC	S. M. Fazlur Rahman	43,926	39.86	
INC	Mahananda Haldar	42,585	38.64	
Independent	Nihar Ranjan Roy	14,533	13.19	
Independent	Bijoy Krishna Sarkar	9,167	8.32	
Majority		1,341	1.22	
Turnout		110,211	95.65	
INC hold		Swing		

=== 1951 ===
1951 West Bengal Legislative Assembly election: Nakesipara
Party	Candidate	Votes	%	±%
INC	Jagannath Mazumder	10,965	45.71	
Independent	Jonab Badraddin	6,201	25.85	
Independent	Sankar Prem Chaitanya Brahmachari	2,417	10.08	
Independent	Sailendra Nath Das Gupta	1,645	6.86	
Independent	Rabindra Kumar Biswas	1,114	4.64	
Independent	Savitri Devi	968	4.04	
Independent	Durgadas Bhattacherjee	676	2.82	
Majority		4,764	19.86	
Turnout		23,986	41.85	
INC win (new seat)				
