= Bethuadahri =

Bethuadahari BETHUA
- Town
- Bethuadahari
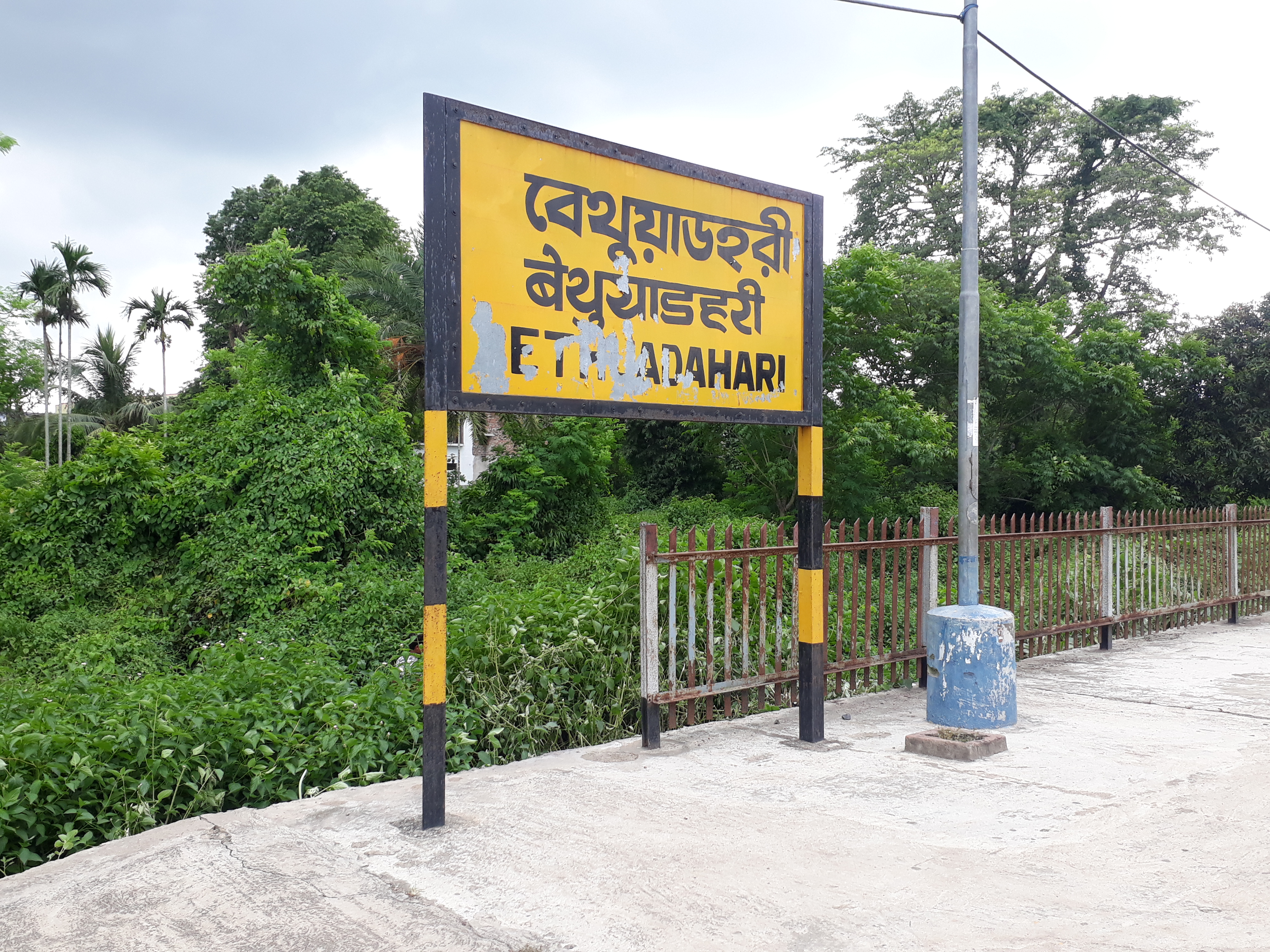
- Bethuadahari railway station

- Location in West Bengal Bethuadahari (India)
- Coordinates: 23.6107°N 88.3849°E
- Country: India
- State: West Bengal
- District: Nadia

Population (2011)
  - Total: 4,923
- Time zone: UTC+5:30 (IST)
- Postal code: 741126
- Vehicle registration: WB-52
- Website: nadia.gov.in

Bethuadahari is a town in the Nakashipara CD block in the Krishnanagar Sadar subdivision of the Nadia district of the state of West Bengal, India. It is almost 28 km from the district headquarters Krishnanagar. Bethuadahari Wildlife Sanctuary is in Bethuadahari (Nakashipara area) of Nadia District, West Bengal, India. The sanctuary is located beside National Highway 12 (old no NH 34). The sanctuary covers 67 hectares (170 acres), and was established in 1980 to preserve a portion of the central Gangetic alluvial zone.

== Geography ==
Cities and towns in Krishnanagr Sadar subdivision of Nadia district
M: municipal town/ city, CT: census town, R: rural/ urban centre, H: place of historical/ religious interest, T: place of tourist interest.
Owing to space constraints in the small map, the actual locations in a larger map may vary slightly

=== Location ===
Bethuadahari is located at 23.6107°N 88.3849°E.

=== Area overview ===
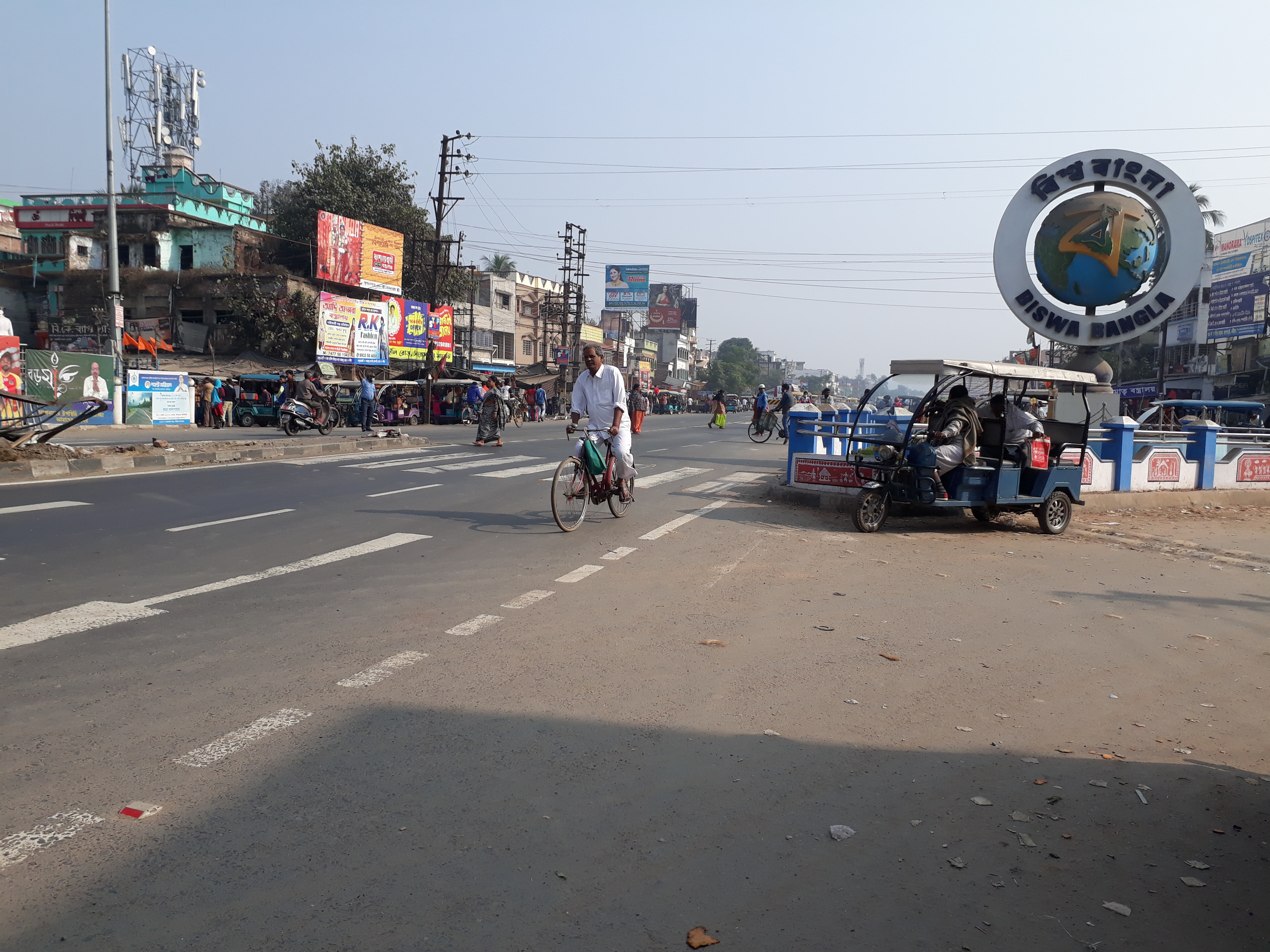
Bethuadahari bus stand

Nadia district is mostly alluvial plains lying to the east of Hooghly River, locally known as Bhagirathi. The alluvial plains are cut across by such distributaries as Jalangi, Churni and Ichhamati. With these rivers getting silted up, floods are a recurring feature. The Krishnanagar Sadar subdivision, presented in the map alongside, has the Bhagirathi on the west, with Purba Bardhaman district lying across the river. The long stretch along the Bhagirathi has many swamps. The area between the Bhagirathi and the Jalangi, which flows through the middle of the subdivision, is known as Kalantar, a low-lying tract of black clay soil. A big part of the subdivision forms the Krishnanagar-Santipur Plain, which occupies the central part of the district. The Jalangi, after flowing through the middle of the subdivision, turns right and joins the Bhagirathi. On the south-east, the Churni separates the Krishnanagar-Santipur Plain from the Ranaghat-Chakdaha Plain. The east forms the boundary with Bangladesh. The subdivision is moderately urbanized. 20.795% of the population lives in urban areas and 79.205% lives in rural areas.

Note: The map alongside presents some of the notable locations in the subdivision. All places marked in the map are linked in the larger full screen map. All the four subdivisions are presented with maps on the same scale – the size of the maps vary as per the area of the subdivision.

== Demographics ==
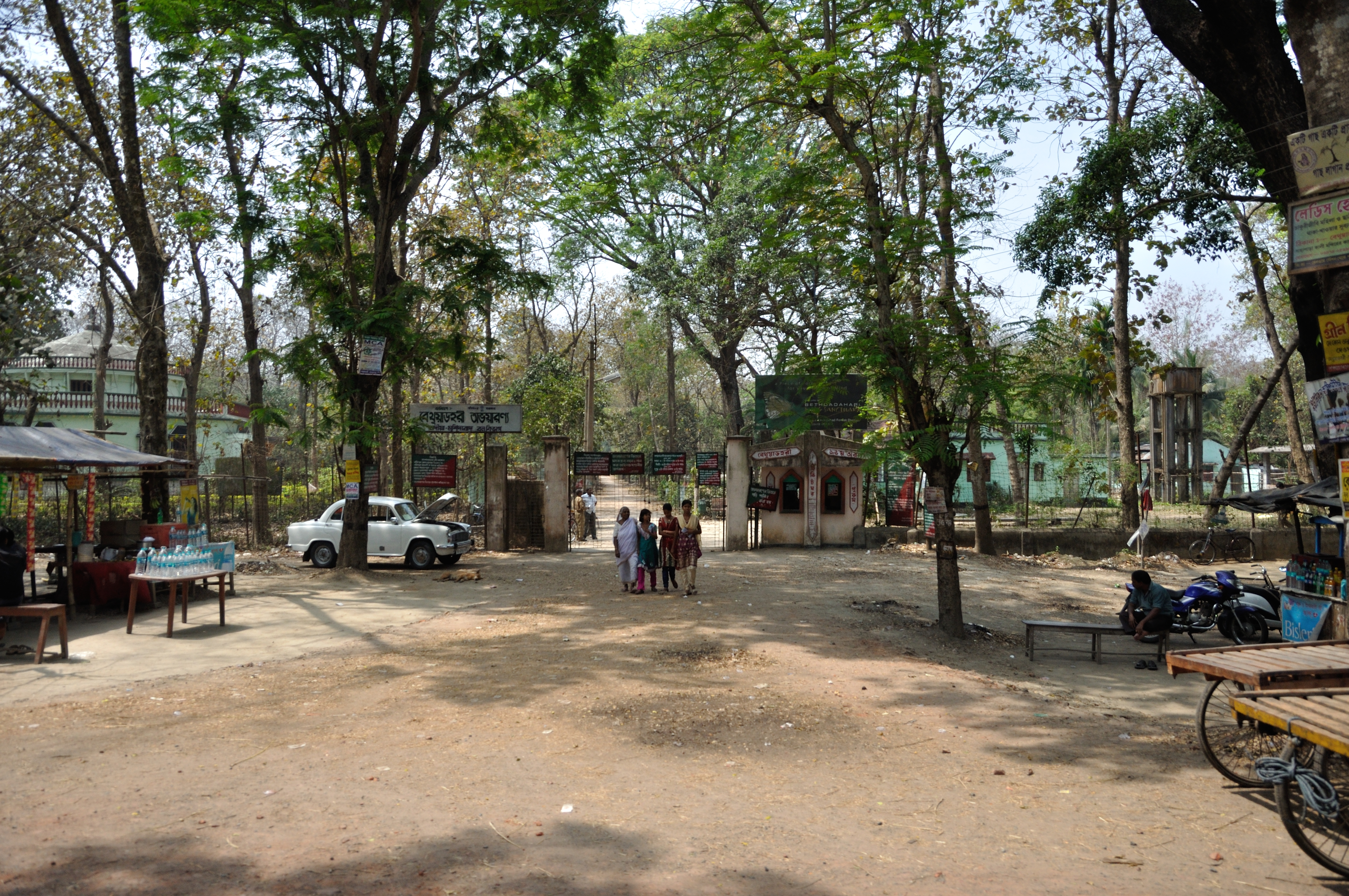
Bethuadahari Wildlife Sanctuary

According to the 2011 Census of India, Bethuadahari had a total population of 4,923, of which 2,540 (52%) were males and 2,383 (48%) were females. Population in the age range 0–6 years was 436. The total number of literate persons in Bethuadahri was 3,502 (78.05% of the population over 6 years).

== Transport ==
Bethuadahari Railway Station is on the Ranaghat–Krishnanagar City–Lalgola line of the Eastern Railway, which connects it with Sealdah station. Some passenger and express trains pass through the station for the whole day as a regular basis.

National Highway 12 (old number 34) passes through the area. Bethuadahari is directly connected with Kolkata and Siliguri by road.

== Sanctuary ==
The nearby reserve forest is known mainly for python and deer. Bethuadahari Avayaranya or Bethuadahari Wildlife Sanctuary is very important tourist spot of the state. It is famous for insemination of deer. The sanctuary covers 67 hectares (170 acres), and was established in 1980 to preserve a portion of the central Gangetic alluvial ecozone. There is a sugarcane laboratory in front of the local Block Development Office.
