= Harindanga (disambiguation) =

Harindanga refers to a village in Mathurapur I CD block, Diamond Harbour subdivision, South 24 Parganas district, West Bengal, India

It also refers to:

- Harindanga, Falta, a village in Falta CD block, Diamond Harbour subdivision, South 24 Parganas, West Bengal, India
- Harindanga, Nadia, a census town in Krishnanagar II CD block, Krishnanagar Sadar subdivision, Nadia district, West Bengal, India
