= Majdia =

Majdia or Majhdia may refer to:

- Majhdia, Krishnaganj, a village in Krishnaganj CD block in Krishnanagar Sadar subdivision, Nadia district, West Bengal, India
- Majdia, Nabadwip, a census town in Nabadwip CD block in Krishnanagar Sadar subdivision, Nadia district, West Bengal, India
