= Nabadwip (community development block) =

- Community development block
- Coordinates: 23.4098934°N 88.4198570°E
- Country: India
- State: West Bengal
- District: Nadia

Government
  - Type: Community development block

Area
  - Total: 97.39 km^{2} (37.60 sq mi)
- Elevation: 15 m (49 ft)

Population (2011)
  - Total: 135,314
  - Density: 1,389/km^{2} (3,599/sq mi)

Languages
  - Official: Bengali, English

Literacy (2011)
  - Total literates: 81,116 (67.72%)
- Time zone: UTC+5:30 (IST)
- PIN: 741302 (Nabadwip); 741301 (Char Brahmanagar); 741507 (Majdia); 741313 (Mayapur)
- Telephone/STD code: 03472
- Vehicle registration: WB-51, WB-52
- Lok Sabha constituency: Ranaghat
- Vidhan Sabha constituency: Nabadwip
- Website: nadia.nic.in

Nabadwip is a community development block that forms an administrative division in Krishnanagar Sadar subdivision of Nadia district in the Indian state of West Bengal.

== History ==
Nabadwip was the capital of Lakshman Sen from 1179 to 1203. Chaitanya Mahaprabhu was born here in 1486.

Ballal Dhipi in Bamanpukur, is an ancient site, which has been excavated by the Archaeological Survey of India that indicates the existence of a Buddhist vihara dating back to 10-12th century or earlier. Two separate sites are identified as Monuments of National Importance.

== Geography ==
Maheshganj is located at 23°24′36″N 88°25′11″E.

Nabadwip CD Block is bounded by Krishnanagar II CD Block in the north, Krishnanagar I CD Block in the east, Santipur in the south and Purbasthali I CD Block in Bardhaman district in the west.

Nadia district is mostly alluvial plains lying to the east of Hooghly River, locally known as Bhagirathi. The alluvial plains are cut across by such distributaries as Jalangi, Churni and Ichhamati. Floods are common with these rivers silting up.

Nabadwip CD Block has an area of 97.39 km^{2}. It has 1 panchayat samity, 8 gram panchayats, 104 gram sansads (village councils), 25 mouzas and 21 inhabited villages. Nabadwip police station serves this block. Headquarters of this CD Block is at Nabadwip.

Gram panchayats of Nabadwip block/ panchayat samiti are: Bablari Dewanganj, Char Majdia Char Brahmanagar, Fakirdanga-Gholapara, Mahisura, Majdia-Pansila, Mayapur-Bamanpukur I, Mayapur-Bamanpukur II and Swarupganj.

== Demographics ==
=== Population ===
As per the 2011 Census of India, Nabadwip CD Block had a total population of 135,314, of which 76,214 were rural and 59,073 were urban. There were 69,696 (52%) males and 65,618 (48%) females. The population below 6 years was 15,537. Scheduled Castes numbered 19,612 (14.49%) and Scheduled Tribes numbered 1,642 (1.14%).

As per the 2001 census, Nabadwip block had a total population of 121,793, out of which 62,765 were males and 59,028 were females. Nabadwip block registered a population growth of 16.51 per cent during the 1991–2001 decade. Decadal growth for the district was 19.51 per cent. Decadal growth in West Bengal was 17.84 per cent.

There are several census towns in Nabadwip CD Block (2011 census figures in brackets): Bamanpukur (9,137), Tiorkhali (11,148), Bablari Dewanganj (6,806), Gadigachha (14,085), Majdia (7,831), Char Maijdia (5,013) and Char Brahmanagar (5,053).

Large villages (with 4,000+ population) in Nabadwip CD Block were (2011 census figures in brackets): Charkashthasali (6,304), Ballaldighi (4,613), Pansila (8,200), Bankar Dhopadi (4,156), Gadkhali (5,057) and Mohisunra (15,910).

=== Literacy ===
As per the 2011 census, the total number of literates in Nabadwip CD Block was 81,116 (67.72% of the population over 6 years) out of which males numbered 45,566 (73.80% of the male population over 6 years) and females numbered 35,550 (61.26% of the female population over 6 years). The gender disparity (the difference between female and male literacy rates) was 12.54%.

Literacy in CD blocks of
Nadia district
Tehatta subdivision
Karimpur I – 67.70%
Karimpur II – 62.04%
Tehatta I – 70.72%
Tehatta II – 68.52%
Krishnanagar Sadar subdivision
Kaliganj – 65.89%
Nakashipara – 64.86%
Chapra – 68.25%
Krishnanagar I – 71.45%
Krishnanagar II – 68.52%
Nabadwip – 67.72%
Krishnaganj – 72.86%
Ranaghat subdivision
Hanskhali – 80.11%
Santipur – 73.10%
Ranaghat I – 77.61%
Ranaghat II – 79.38%
Kalyani subdivision
Chakdaha – 64.17%
Haringhata – 82.15%
Source: 2011 Census: CD Block Wise
Primary Census Abstract Data

See also – List of West Bengal districts ranked by literacy rate

=== Language and religion ===
Religion in Nabadwip CD block (2011)
Hinduism	61.39%
Islam	38.20%
Other or not stated	0.41%

In the 2011 census, Hindus numbered 83,069 and formed 61.39% of the population in Nabadwip CD Block. Muslims numbered 51,685 and formed 38.20% of the population. Christians numbered 44 and formed 0.03% of the population. Others numbered 516 and formed 0.38% of the population.

In the 2001 census, Hindus numbered 79,059 and formed 64.91% of the population of Nabadwip CD Block. Muslims numbered 42,636 and formed 35.00% of the population. In the 1991 census, Hindus numbered 69,549 and formed 66.53% of the population of Nabadwip CD Block. Muslims numbered 34,961 and formed 33.45% of the population.

Bengali is the predominant language, spoken by 99.06% of the population.

== Rural poverty ==
The District Human Development Report for Nadia has provided a CD Block-wise data table for Modified Human Vulnerability Index of the district. Nabadwip CD Block registered 34.48 on the MHPI scale. The CD Block-wise mean MHVI was estimated at 33.92. A total of 8 out of the 17 CD Blocks in Nadia district were found to be severely deprived when measured against the CD Block mean MHVI - Karimpur I and Karimpur II (under Tehatta subdivision), Kaliganj, Nakashipara, Chapra, Krishnanagar I and Nabadwip (under Krishnanagar Sadar subdivision) and Santipur (under Ranaghat subdivision) appear to be backward.

As per the Human Development Report 2004 for West Bengal, the rural poverty ratio in Nadia district was 28.35%. The estimate was based on Central Sample data of NSS 55th round 1999–2000.

== Economy ==
=== Livelihood ===
In Nabadwip CD Block in 2011, amongst the class of total workers, cultivators formed 9.21%, agricultural labourers 16.77, household industry workers 27.01% and other workers 47.01%.

The southern part of Nadia district starting from Krishnanagar I down to Chakdaha and Haringhata has some urban pockets specialising in either manufacturing or service related economic activity and has reflected a comparatively higher concentration of population but the urban population has generally stagnated. Nadia district still has a large chunk of people living in the rural areas.

=== Infrastructure ===
There are 21 inhabited villages in Nabadwip CD Block. 100% villages have power supply and drinking water supply. 6 Villages (28.57%) have post offices. 21 villages (100%) have telephones (including landlines, public call offices and mobile phones). 13 villages (61.90%) have a pucca approach road and 9 villages (42.86%) have transport communication (includes bus service, rail facility and navigable waterways). Only 1 village (4.76%) has agricultural credit society and 2 villages (9.52%) have banks. It should, however, be noted that although 100% villages in Nadia district had power supply in 2011, a survey in 2007-08 revealed that less than 50% of households had electricity connection. In rural areas of the country, the tube well was for many years considered to be the provider of safe drinking water, but with arsenic contamination of ground water claiming public attention it is no longer so. Piped water supply is still a distant dream. In 2007–08, the availability of piped drinking water in Nadia district was as low as 8.6%, well below the state average of around 20%.

=== Agriculture ===
Persons engaged in agriculture
in Nabadwip CD Block
1. Bargadars (6.75%)
2. Patta holders (29.6%)
3. Small farmers (2.94%)
4. Marginal farmers (25.8%)
5. Agricultural labourers (34.9%)

Although the Bargadari Act of 1950 recognised the rights of bargadars to a higher share of crops from the land that they tilled, it was not implemented fully. Large tracts, beyond the prescribed limit of land ceiling, remained with the rich landlords. From 1977 onwards major land reforms took place in West Bengal. Land in excess of land ceiling was acquired and distributed amongst the peasants. Following land reforms land ownership pattern has undergone transformation. In 2013–14, persons engaged in agriculture in Nabadwip CD Block could be classified as follows: bargadars 6.75%, patta (document) holders 29.61%, small farmers (possessing land between 1 and 2 hectares) 2.94%, marginal farmers (possessing land up to 1 hectare) 25.83% and agricultural labourers 34.88%. As the proportion of agricultural labourers is very high, the real wage in the agricultural sector has been a matter of concern.

Nabadwip CD Block had 29 fertiliser depots, 3 seed stores and 91 fair price shops in 2013–14.

In 2013–14, Nabadwip CD Block produced 2,164 tonnes of Aman paddy, the main winter crop from 888 hectares, 8,134 tonnes of Boro paddy (spring crop) from 2,164 hectares, 2,567 tonnes of Aus paddy (summer crop) from 1,187 hectares, 17,585 tonnes of wheat from 4,307 hectares, 1,943 tonnes of maize from 752 hectares, 56,296 tonnes of jute from 3,632 hectares and 11,204 tonnes of potatoes from 371 hectares. It also produced pulses and oilseeds.

In 2013–14, the total area irrigated in Nabadwip CD Block was 370 hectares, out of which 112 hectares were irrigated by river lift irrigation and 258 hectares by deep tube wells.

=== Banking ===
In 2013–14, Nabadwip CD Block had offices of 7 commercial banks and 2 gramin banks.

== Transport ==
Nabadwip CD Block has 6 ferry services and 3 originating/ terminating bus services.

The Bandel-Katwa branch line passes through this CD Block and there are stations at Nabadwip Dham railway station and Bishnupriya Halt.

SH 8 running from Santaldih (in Purulia district) to Majhdia (in Nadia district) passes through this district.

== Education ==
In 2013–14, Nabadwip CD Block had 89 primary schools with 6,787 students, 6 middle schools with 1,196 students and 8 higher secondary schools with 9,997 students. Nabadwip CD Block had 216 institutions for special and non-formal education with 8,566 students

In Nabadwip CD Block, amongst the 21 inhabited villages, 1 village did not have any school, 19 had more than 1 primary school and 8 had at least 1 primary and 7 middle school.

== Healthcare ==
In 2014, Nabadwip CD Block had 1 block primary health centre and 2 primary health centres with total 40 beds and 8 doctors (excluding private bodies). It had 18 family welfare subcentres. 3,599 patients were treated indoor and 164,449 patients were treated outdoor in the hospitals, health centres and subcentres of the CD Block.

Maheshganj Rural Hospital, with 30 beds at Maheshganj, is the major government medical facility in the Nabadwip CD block. There are primary health centres at Mayapur under Nabadwip (with 10 beds) and Fakirdanga (with 2 beds).

Nabadwip State General Hospital at Nabadwip functions with 125 beds. The blood bank service was started on August 14, 2015, at this Nabadwip Hospital.

Nabadwip CD Block is one of the areas of Nadia district where ground water is affected by high level of arsenic contamination. The WHO guideline for arsenic in drinking water is 10 mg/ litre, and the Indian Standard value is 50 mg/ litre. All the 17 blocks of Nadia district have arsenic contamination above this level. The maximum concentration in Nabadwip CD Block is 980 mg/litre.
