= Bamanpukur =

- Census Town
- Location in West Bengal, India Bamanpukur (India)
- Coordinates: 23.445394°N 88.405317°E
- Country: India
- State: West Bengal
- District: Nadia

Area
  - Total: 3.1022 km^{2} (1.1978 sq mi)

Population (2011)
  - Total: 9,137
  - Density: 2,945/km^{2} (7,628/sq mi)

Languages
  - Official: Bengali, English
- Time zone: UTC+5:30 (IST)
- PIN: 741313
- Telephone/STD code: 03472
- Lok Sabha constituency: Ranaghat
- Vidhan Sabha constituency: Nabadwip
- Website: nadia.gov.in

Bamanpukur is a census town in the Nabadwip CD block in the Krishnanagar Sadar subdivision of the Nadia district in the state of West Bengal, India.

== Geography ==
Cities and towns in Krishnanagr Sadar subdivision of Nadia district
M: municipal town/ city, CT: census town, R: rural/ urban centre, H: place of historical/ religious interest, T: place of tourist interest.
Owing to space constraints in the small map, the actual locations in a larger map may vary slightly

=== Location ===
Bamanpukur is located at 23.445394°N 88.405317°E.

=== Area overview ===
Nadia district is mostly alluvial plains lying to the east of Hooghly River, locally known as Bhagirathi. The alluvial plains are cut across by such distributaries as Jalangi, Churni and Ichhamati. With these rivers getting silted up, floods are a recurring feature. The Krishnanagar Sadar subdivision, presented in the map alongside, has the Bhagirathi on the west, with Purba Bardhaman district lying across the river. The long stretch along the Bhagirathi has many swamps. The area between the Bhagirathi and the Jalangi, which flows through the middle of the subdivision, is known as Kalantar, a low-lying tract of black clay soil. A big part of the subdivision forms the Krishnanagar-Santipur Plain, which occupies the central part of the district. The Jalangi, after flowing through the middle of the subdivision, turns right and joins the Bhagirathi. On the south-east, the Churni separates the Krishnanagar-Santipur Plain from the Ranaghat-Chakdaha Plain. The east forms the boundary with Bangladesh. The subdivision is moderately urbanized. 20.795% of the population lives in urban areas and 79.205% lives in rural areas.

Note: The map alongside presents some of the notable locations in the subdivision. All places marked in the map are linked in the larger full screen map. All the four subdivisions are presented with maps on the same scale – the size of the maps vary as per the area of the subdivision.

== Demographics ==
According to the 2011 Census of India, Bamanpukur had a total population of 9,137, of which 4,656 (51%) were males and 4,481 (49%) were females. Population in the age range 0–6 years was 957. The total number of literate persons in Bamanpukur was 6,262 (76.55% of the population over 6 years).

== Infrastructure ==
According to the District Census Handbook 2011, Nadia, Bamanpukur covered an area of 3.1022 km^{2}. Among the civic amenities, the protected water supply involved tap water from untreated sources. It had 1,200 domestic electric connections, 100 road light points. Among the medical facilities it had 2 medicine shops. Among the educational facilities it had were 6 primary school, 2 secondary schools, 1 senior secondary school. Three important commodities it produced were rice, wheat, mustard oil. It had the branch office of 1 nationalised bank.

== Ballal Dhipi ==
Ballal Dhipi in Bamanpukur, is an ancient site, which has been excavated by the Archaeological Survey of India that indicates the existence of a Buddhist vihara dating back to 10-12th century or earlier. Two separate sites are identified as Monuments of National Importance.

== Ballal Dhipi picture gallery ==
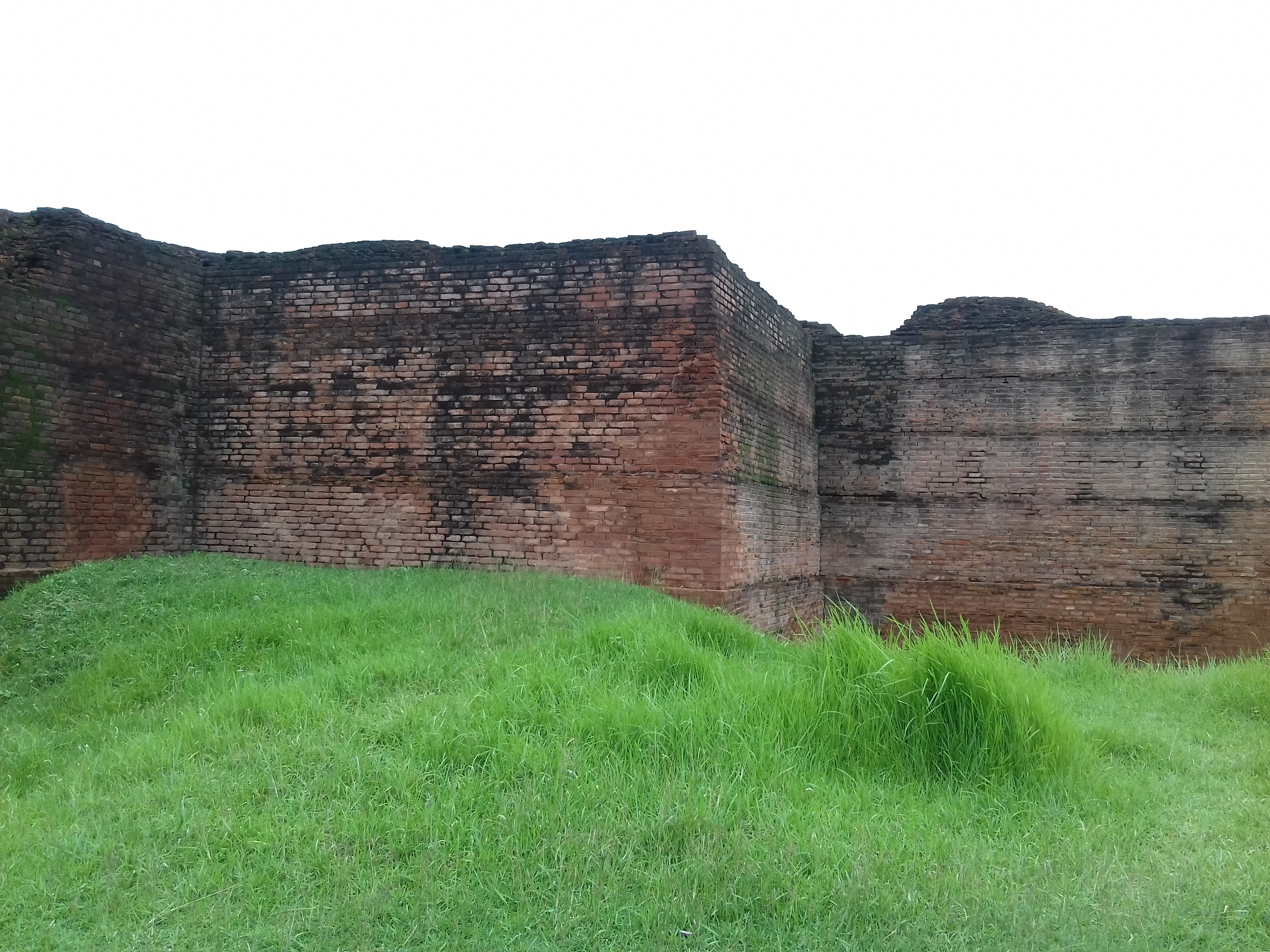
Popular traditionally as Bamanpukur mound, these are now a part of Ballal Dhipi

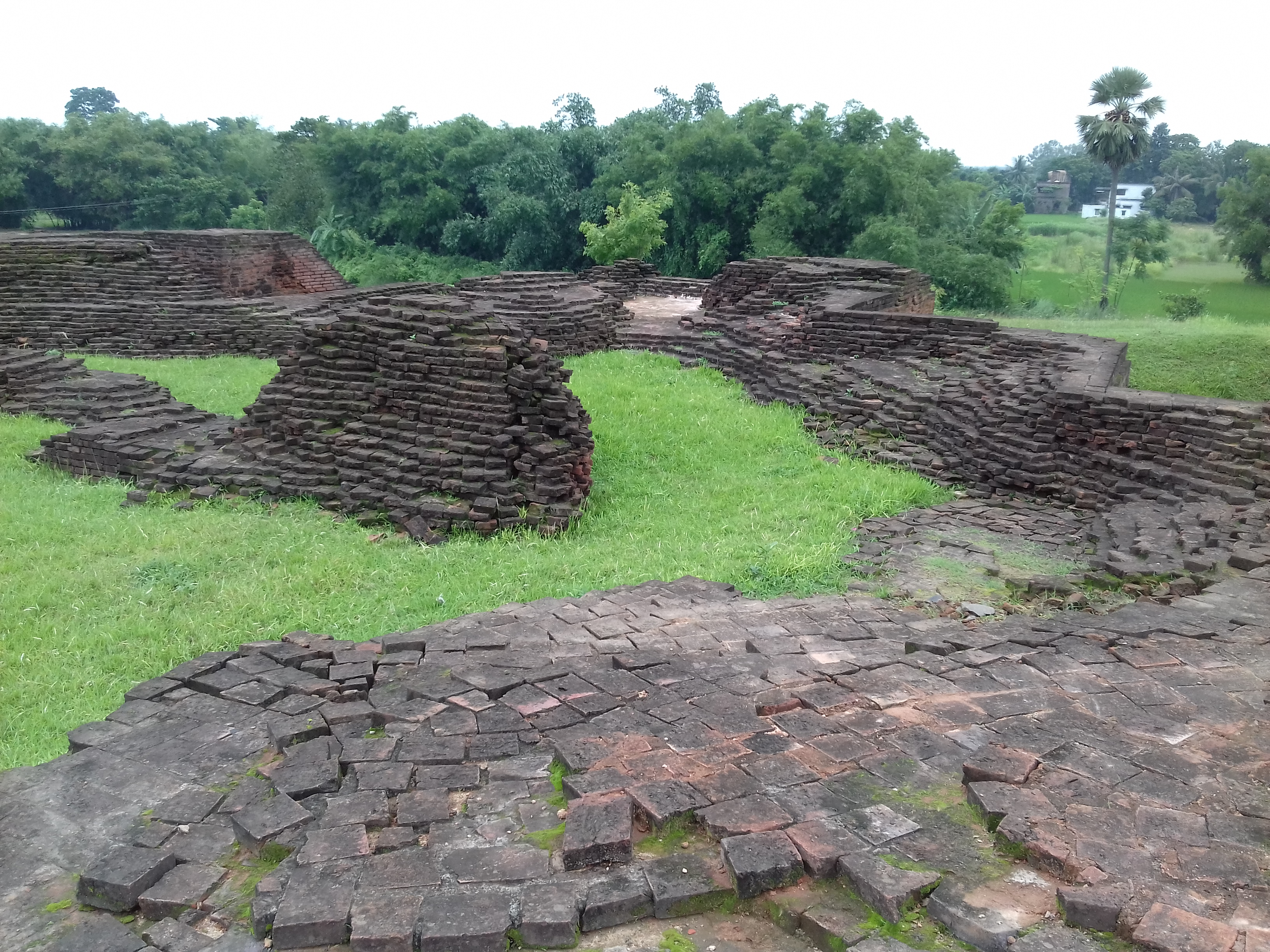
It was earlier thought of as the remains of a fort

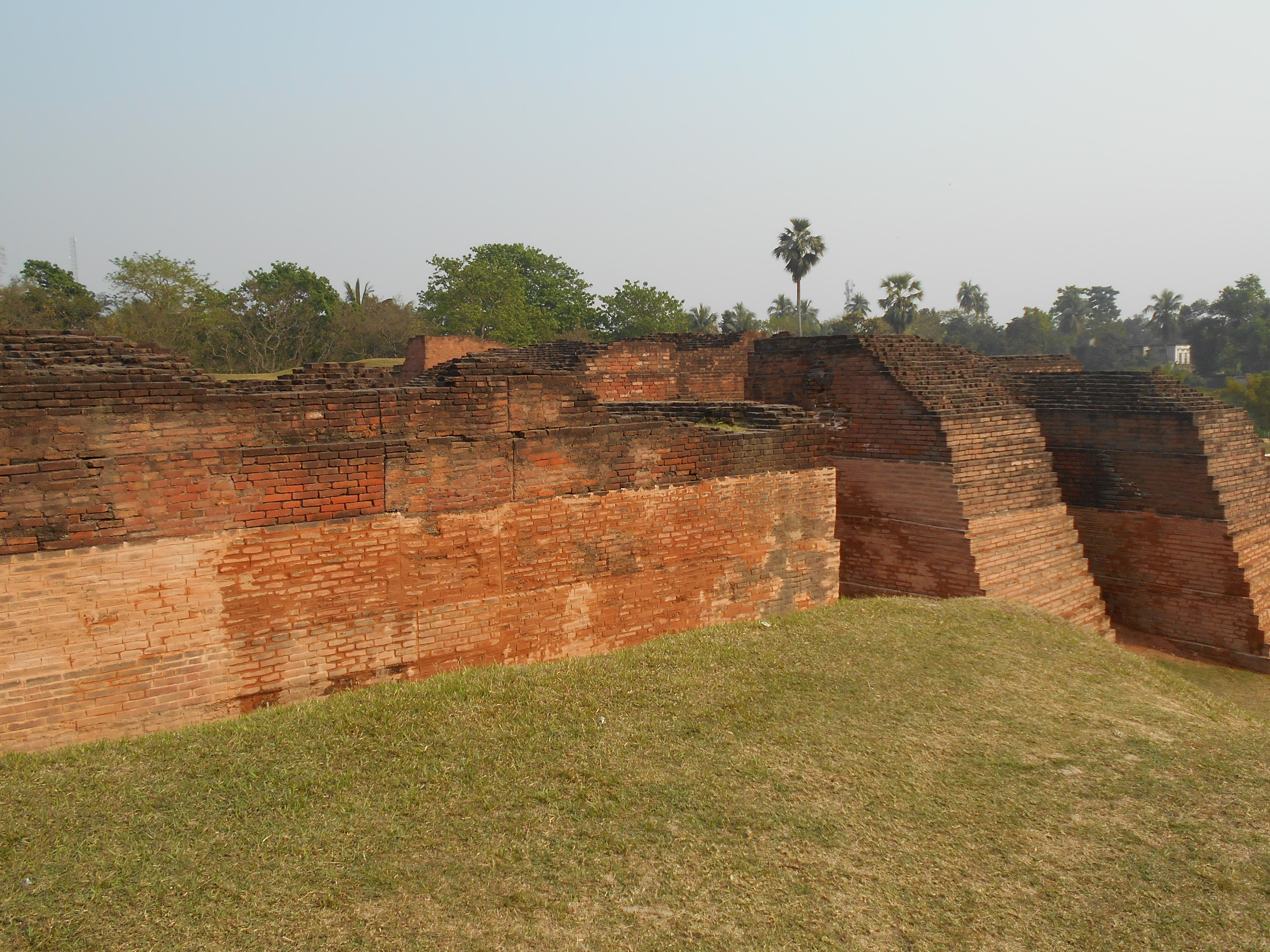
Ballal Dhipi: A part of the extensive structural complex

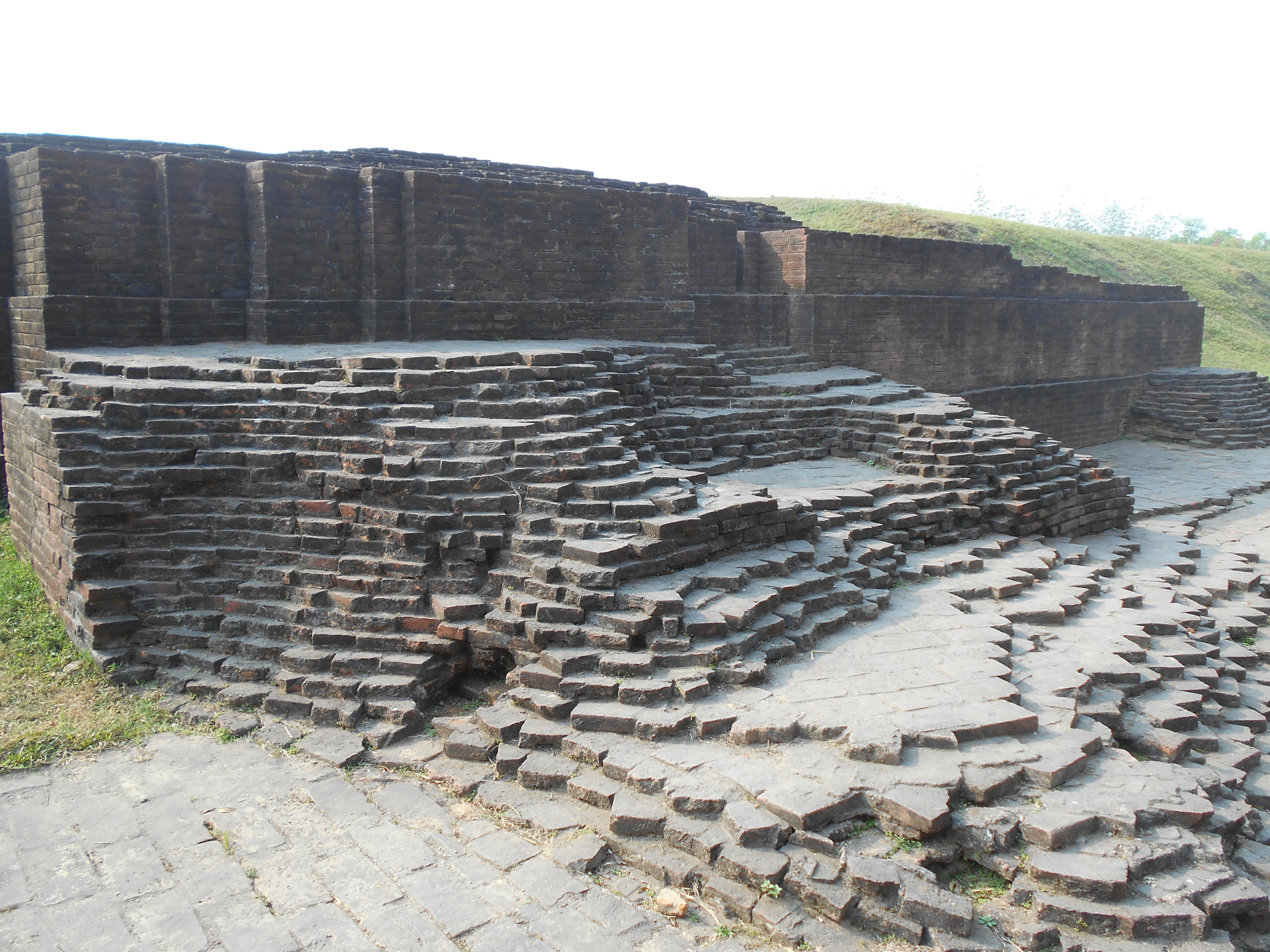
Ballal Dhipi: A part of the extensive structural complex

== Education ==
Bamanpukur High School is a Bengali-medium coeducational institution established in 1921. It has facilities for teaching from class V to class XII. The school has a library with 1,650 books, 18 computers and a play ground.
