= Krishnanagar Sadar subdivision =

- Subdivision
- Coordinates: 23.40°N 88.50°E
- Country: India
- State: West Bengal
- District: Nadia
- Headquarters: Krishnanagar

Languages
  - Official: Bengali, English
- Time zone: UTC+5:30 (IST)
- ISO 3166 code: ISO 3166-2:IN
- Vehicle registration: WB
- Website: nadia.nic.in

Krishnanagar Sadar subdivision is an administrative subdivision of Nadia district in the state of West Bengal, India.

== Overview ==
Nadia district is part of the large alluvial plain formed by the Ganges-Bhagirathi system. The plains spread southwards from the head of the delta. The Krishnanagar Sadar subdivision has the Bhagirathi on the west, with Purba Bardhaman district lying across the river. The long stretch along the Bhagirathi has many swamps. The area between the Bhagirathi and the Jalangi, which flows through the middle of the subdivision, is known as Kalantar, a low-lying tract of black clay soil. A big part of the subdivision forms the Krishnanagar-Santipur Plain, which occupies the central part of the district. After flowing through the middle of the subdivision, the Jalangi turns right and joins the Bhagirathi. On the south-east, the Churni separates the Krishnanagar-Santipur Plain from the Ranaghat-Chakdaha Plain. A portion of the east forms the boundary with Bangladesh. The area had large forests. The huge influx of East Bengali refugees that took place in the district immediately after the partition of India and the steady influx ever since paved way for conversion of forest into agricultural land.

== Subdivisions ==
Nadia district is divided into the following administrative subdivisions:

42.5

Subdivision	Headquarters	Area km^{2}	Population (2011)	Rural population % (2011)	Urban population % (2011)
Tehatta	Tehatta	862.18	796,245	97.15	2.85
Krishnanagar Sadar	Krishnanagar	1,661.10	2,186,503	79.205	20.795
Ranaghat	Ranaghat	893.58	1,432,761	58.32	41.68
Kalyani	Kalyani	526.57	891,563	23.27	76.73
Nadia district	Krishnanagar	3,927.00	5,307,072	66.86	33.14

Cities and towns in Krishnanagr Sadar subdivision of Nadia district
M: municipal town/ city, CT: census town, R: rural/ urban centre, H: place of historical/ religious interest, T: place of tourist interest.
Owing to space constraints in the small map, the actual locations in a larger map may vary slightly

== Administrative units ==
Krishnanagar Sadar subdivision has 8 police stations, 7 community development blocks, 7 panchayat samitis, 77 gram panchayats, 534 mouzas, 487 inhabited villages 2 municipalities and 16 census towns. The municipalities are: Krishnanagar and Nabadwip. The census towns are: Mira, Matiari, Jagadanandapur, Kshidirpur, Chapra, Sonda, Baruihuda, Paschimbhatjangla, Bamanpukur, Tiorkhali, Bablari Dewanganj, Gadigachha, Majdia, Char Maijdia and Char Brahmanagar.

The subdivision has its headquarters at Krishnanagar.

== Police stations ==
Police stations in Krishnanagar Sadar subdivision have the following features and jurisdiction:

Police station	Area covered km^{2}	India-Bangladesh border km	Municipal town	CD Block
Kotwali	289.15	-	Krishnanagar	Krishnanagar I
Women	n/a			
Dhubulia	134.74	5	-	Krishnanagar II
Nabadwip	102.94	-	Nabadwip	Nabadwip
Kaliganj	320.02	-	-	Kaliganj
Nakashipara	313.18	-	-	Nakashipara
Chapra	306	37.5	-	Chapra
Krishnaganj	151.60	48	-	Krishnaganj

== Blocks ==
Community development blocks in Krishnanagar Sadar subdivision are:

CD Block	Headquarters	Area km^{2}	Population (2011)	SC %	ST %	Hindus %	Muslims %	Literacy rate %	Census Towns
Kaliganj	Debagram	320.02	334,881	15.22	0.49	41.36	58.51	65.89	2
Nakashipara	Bethuadahari	360.94	386,569	23.27	2.56	46.53	53.06	64.86	2
Chapra	Chapra	305.97	310,652	15.85	0.65	37.15	59.72	68.28	1
Krishnaganj	Majhdia	151.60	156,705	45.55	6,47	93.98	5.87	72.86	-
Krishnanagar I	Ruipukur	273.19	314,833	35.96	5.09	82.78	15.25	71.45	3
Krishnanagar II	Dhubulia	124.37	139,472	18.33	1.64	57.02	42.84	68.52	1
Nabadwip	Nabadwip	97.39	135,314	14.49	1.14	61.39	38.20	67.72	7

== Gram Panchayats ==
The subdivision contains 77 gram panchayats under 7 community development blocks:

Kaliganj block consists of 15 gram panchayats, viz. Barachandghar, Hatgachha, Mira–I, Palitbegia, Debagram, Juranpur, Mira–II, Panighata, Faridpur, Kaliganj, Plassey–I, Rajarampur Ghoraikhetra, Gobra, Matiari and Plassey–II.

Nakashipara block consists of 15 gram panchayats, viz. Bethuadahari-1, Billwagram, Dharmada, Muragachha, Bethua Dahari–II, Birpur–I, Dogachhia, Nakasipara, Bikrampur, Birpur–II, Haranagar, Patikabari, Bilkumari, Dhananjaypur and Majhergram.

Chapra block consists of 13 gram panchayats, viz. Alfa, Chapra–II, Hridaypur, Pipragachhi, Bagberia, Hatisala–I, Kalinga, Brittihuda, Hatisala–II, Mahatpur, Chapra–I, Hatkhola and Maheshpur.

Krishnanagar I block consists of 12 gram panchayats, viz. Assannagar, Bhatjungla, Dignagar, Joania, Bhaluka, Bhimpur, Dogachi, Poragachha, Bhandarkhola, Chakdilnagar, Daypara and Ruipukur.

Krishnanagar II block consists of seven gram panchayats, viz. Belpukur, Dhubulia–II, Naopara–II, Sadhanpara–II, Dhubulia–I, Naopara–I and Sadhanpara–I.

Nabadwip block consists of eight gram panchayats, viz. Bablari, Mahisura, Mayapur Bamanpukur–II, Charmajdia Charbrahmanagar, Majdia Pansila, Mayapur Bamanpukur–I, Swarupganj and Fakirdanga Gholapara.

Krishnaganj block consists of seven gram panchayats, viz. Bhajanghat Tungi, Joyghata, Matiary, Taldah Majdia, Gobindapur, Krishnaganj and Shibnibas.

== Education ==
Nadia district had a literacy rate of 74.97% as per the provisional figures of the 2011 census. Tehatta subdivision had a literacy rate of 67.25%, Krishnanagar Sadar subdivision 71.03%, Ranaghat subdivision 79.51% and Kalyani subdivision 83.35.

The table below presents a comprehensive picture of the education scenario in Nadia district for the year 2013-14:

Subdivision	Primary School		Middle School		High School		Higher Secondary School		General College, Univ		Technical / Professional Instt		Non-formal Education	
Subdivision	Institution	Student	Institution	Student	Institution	Student	Institution	Student	Institution	Student	Institution	Student	Institution	Student
Tehatta	424	35,755	27	3,746	12	9,223	53	85,338	2	9,556	7	705	1,321	49,314
Krishnanagar Sadar	1,066	106,019	82	14,710	39	22,754	160	222,437	9	26,970	24	3,265	2,836	106,868
Ranaghat	707	57,335	45	4,494	39	20,958	106	147,018	4	22,678	4	326	2,000	58,835
Kalyani	428	32,856	28	2,594	15	7,160	86	95,192	4	15477	27	12,522	1,160	22,331
Nadia district	2,625	231,965	182	25,544	105	60,695	405	549,985	19	74,771	62	16,548	7,317	237,348

Note: Primary schools include junior basic schools; middle schools, high schools and higher secondary schools include madrasahs; technical schools include junior technical schools, junior government polytechnics, industrial technical institutes, industrial training centres, nursing training institutes etc.; technical and professional colleges include engineering colleges, medical colleges, para-medical institutes, management colleges, teachers training and nursing training colleges, law colleges, art colleges, music colleges etc. Special and non-formal education centres include sishu siksha kendras, madhyamik siksha kendras, centres of Rabindra mukta vidyalaya, recognised Sanskrit tols, institutions for the blind and other handicapped persons, Anganwadi centres, reformatory schools etc.

The following institutions are located in Krishnanagar subdivision:

- Krishnagar Government College was established at Krishnanagar in 1846. It is affiliated to the University of Kalyani. It offers honours courses in Bengali, English, Sanskrit, philosophy, history, political science, economics, physics, chemistry, mathematics, botany, zoology, physiology and geography. It has facilities for MA in philosophy and Bengali, and M.Sc. in geography and zoology. There are 2 hostels for boys.
- Dwijendralal College was established at Krishnanagar in 1968. It is affiliated to the University of Kalyani. It offers honours courses in Bengali, English, Sanskrit, history, philosophy, political science, geography and B.Com.
- Krishnagar Women's College was established at Krishnanagar in 1958. It is affiliated to the University of Kalyani and offers undergraduate courses in arts and science.
- Bethuadahari College was established at Bethuadahari in 1986. It is affiliated to the University of Kalyani. It offers honours courses in Bengali, history, geography, political science and accountancy. Local traders, cultivators, agricultural labourers, hawkers, rickshaw pullers, porters and other citizens contributed extensively either by extending financial help or by offering manual labour to build the college.
- Kaliganj Government College was established at Debagram in 2015. Affiliated to the University of Kalyani, it offers honours courses in Bengali, English, Sanskrit, history, botany and physiology. Commerce course will start in 2017-18 session.
- Nabadwip Vidyasagar College was established at Nabadwip in 1942. It initially functioned as a branch of Vidyasagar College, Kolkata, but started functioning as an independent college from 1948. Affiliated to the University of Kalyani, it offers honours courses in Bengali, English, Sanskrit, history, political science, philosophy, education, physics, chemistry, mathematics, zoology, botany, environmental science and accountancy.
- Chapra Bangaljhi Mahavidyalaya was established at Bangaljhi in 2001. Affiliated to the University of Kalyani, it offers honours courses in Bengali, English, Sanskrit, history, geography, political science, philosophy, education and sociology.
- Sudhiranjan Lahiri Mahavidyalaya was established at Majhdia in 1966. Affiliated to the University of Kalyani, it offers courses in Bengali, English, history, political science, sociology, philosophy, geography and B.Com.
- Asannagar Madan Mohan Tarkalankar College was established at Asannagar in 2007. Affiliated to the University of Kalyani, it offers honours courses in Bengali, English, Sanskrit and history.

== Healthcare ==
The table below (all data in numbers) presents an overview of the medical facilities available and patients treated in the hospitals, health centres and sub-centres in 2014 in Nadia district.

Subdivision	Health & Family Welfare Deptt, WB				Other State Govt Deptts	Local bodies	Central Govt Deptts / PSUs	NGO / Private Nursing Homes	Total	Total Number of Beds	Total Number of Doctors*	Indoor Patients	Outdoor Patients
Subdivision	Hospitals	Rural Hospitals	Block Primary Health Centres	Primary Health Centres	Other State Govt Deptts	Local bodies	Central Govt Deptts / PSUs	NGO / Private Nursing Homes	Total	Total Number of Beds	Total Number of Doctors*	Indoor Patients	Outdoor Patients
Tehatta	1	1	2	7	-	-	-	6	17	405	36	36,811	1,035,750
Krishnanagar Sadar	3	4	3	20	2	16	1	31	80	2,386	113	165,867	2,304,887
Ranaghat	2	1	2	15	1	8	-	21	50	780	104	58,507	1,426,852
Kalyani	4	1	-	7	1	5	-	25	43	1,863	226	90,327	1,272,701
Nadia district	10	7	7	49	4	29	1	83	190	5,434	479	351,512	6,040,190

.* Excluding nursing homes

=== Medical facilities ===
Medical facilities in Krishnanagr Sadar subdivision are as follows:

Hospitals in Krishnanagar Sadar subdivision: (Name, location, beds)
B.S.F Camp Hospital, Chapra Seema Nagar, 25 beds
Dr. B.C.Roy Chest Sanatorium, Dhubulia, 1000 beds
Krishnanagar Jail Hospital, Krishnanagar, 33 beds
Krishnanagar Police Hospital, Krishnanagar, 46 beds
Nadia District Hospital, Krishnanagar, 495 beds
Nabadwip State General Hospital, Nabadwip, 125 beds

Rural Hospitals: (Name, block, location, beds)
Kaliganj Rural Hospital, Kaliganj CD Block, Juranpur, 25 beds
Krishnaganj Rural Hospital, Krishnaganj CD Block, Krishnaganj, 25 beds
Bethudahari Rural Hospital, Nakasipara CD Block, Bethuadahari, 60 beds
Chapra Rural Hospital, Chapra CD Block, Bangaljhi, 25 beds
Maheshganj Rural Hospital, Nabadwip CD Block, Maheshganj, 30 beds
Bishnupur Rural Hospital, Krishnanagar I CD Block, Bishnupur, 30 beds
Dhubulia Rural Hospital, Krishnanagar II CD Block, Dhubulia, 30 beds

Primary Health Centres (CD Block-wise)(CD Block, PHC location, beds)
Kaliganj CD Block: Debagram (10 beds), Juranpur (10 beds), Matiari (6 beds), Mira (10 beds), Panighata (20 beds).
Krishnaganj CD Block: Matiari (Banpur) (10 beds), Joyghata (4 beds), Bhajanghat (6 beds).
Nakashipara CD Block: Chakghurni (4 beds), Dharmada (10 beds), Majhergram (6 beds), Nakashipara (Dadpur) (10 beds).
Nabadwip CD Block: Sree Mayapur (10 beds), Fakirdanga (2 beds).
Chapra CD Block: Hridaypur (10 beds), Bagberia (6 beds).
Krishnanagar I CD Block: Asannagar (10 beds), Bhaluka (6 beds).
Krishnanagar II CD Block: Noapara (10 beds), Belpur (6 beds).

== Electoral constituencies ==
Lok Sabha (parliamentary) and Vidhan Sabha (state assembly) constituencies in Krishnanagar Sadar subdivision were as follows:

Lok Sabha constituency	Reservation	Vidhan Sabha constituency	Reservation	CD Block and/or Gram panchayats and/or municipal areas
Krishnanagar	None	Tehatta	None	Betai I, Betai II, Chhitka, Kanainagar, Natna, Patharghata I, Raghunathpur, Shyamnagar and Tehatta gram panchayats of Tehatta I community development block and Dighal, Kandi, Nandanpur, Narayanpur I and Narayanpur II gram panchayats of Karimpur II CD Block
		Palashipara	None	Chanderghat and PatharghataII GPs of Tehatta I CD Block, Tehatta II CD Block, and Bikrampur, Bilkumari, Dhananjaypur and Haranagar GPs of Nakashipara CD Block
		Kaliganj	None	Bara Chandghar. Debagram, Faridpur, Gobra, Hatgachha, Juranpur, Kaliganj, Matiari, Mira I, Mira II, Panighata, Plassey I and Plassey II GPs of Kaliganj CD Block.
		Nakashipara	None	Bethuadahari I and Bethuadahari II, Billwa Gram, Birpur I, Birpur II, Dharmada, Dogachhia, Majher Gram, Muragachha, Nakasipara and Patikabari GPs of Nakashipara CD Block, and Palit Begia and Rajarampur Ghoraikhetra GPs of Kaliganj CD Block
		Chapra	None	Chapra CD Block
		Krishnanagar Uttar	None	Krishnanagar municipality, and Bhandar Khola, Bhimpur, Asannagar, Dogachhi and Pora Gachha GPs of Krishnanagar I CD Block
		Krishnanagar Dakshin	None	Bhat Jungla, Chak Dilnagar, Daypara, Dignagar and Ruipukur GPs of Krishnanagar I CD Block, and Krishnanagar II CD Block
Ranaghat	Reserved for SC	Krishnaganj	Reserved for SC	Krishnaganj CD Block, and Badkulla-I, Badkulla-II, Betna Gobindapur, Dakshin Para I, Dakshin Para II, Gajna, Mayurhat I and Mayurhat II GPs of Hanskhali CD Block
		Nabadwip	None	Nabadwip municipality, Nabadwip CD Block, and Bhaluka and Joania GPs of Krishnanagar I CD Block
		All other Vidhan Sabha segments in Ranaghat subdivision		
