= Majdia, Nabadwip =

Majdia
- Census Town
- Location in West Bengal, India Majdia (India)
- Coordinates: 23.401893°N 88.394087°E
- Country: India
- State: West Bengal
- District: Nadia

Area
  - Total: 2.1213 km^{2} (0.8190 sq mi)

Population (2011)
  - Total: 7,831
  - Density: 3,692/km^{2} (9,561/sq mi)

Languages
  - Official: Bengali, English
- Time zone: UTC+5:30 (IST)
- PIN: 741315
- Telephone/STD code: 03472
- Lok Sabha constituency: Ranaghat
- Vidhan Sabha constituency: Nabadwip
- Website: nadia.gov.in

Majdia is a census town in the Nabadwip CD block in the Krishnanagar Sadar subdivision of the Nadia district in the state of West Bengal, India.

== Geography ==
Cities and towns in Krishnanagr Sadar subdivision of Nadia district
M: municipal town/ city, CT: census town, R: rural/ urban centre, H: place of historical/ religious interest, T: place of tourist interest.
Owing to space constraints in the small map, the actual locations in a larger map may vary slightly

=== Location ===
Majdia is located at 23.401893°N 88.394087°E.

=== Area overview ===
Nadia district is mostly alluvial plains lying to the east of Hooghly River, locally known as Bhagirathi. The alluvial plains are cut across by such distributaries as Jalangi, Churni and Ichhamati. With these rivers getting silted up, floods are a recurring feature. The Krishnanagar Sadar subdivision, presented in the map alongside, has the Bhagirathi on the west, with Purba Bardhaman district lying across the river. The long stretch along the Bhagirathi has many swamps. The area between the Bhagirathi and the Jalangi, which flows through the middle of the subdivision, is known as Kalantar, a low-lying tract of black clay soil. A big part of the subdivision forms the Krishnanagar-Santipur Plain, which occupies the central part of the district. The Jalangi, after flowing through the middle of the subdivision, turns right and joins the Bhagirathi. On the south-east, the Churni separates the Krishnanagar-Santipur Plain from the Ranaghat-Chakdaha Plain. The east forms the boundary with Bangladesh. The subdivision is moderately urbanized. 20.795% of the population lives in urban areas and 79.205% lives in rural areas.

Note: The map alongside presents some of the notable locations in the subdivision. All places marked in the map are linked in the larger full screen map. All the four subdivisions are presented with maps on the same scale – the size of the maps vary as per the area of the subdivision.

== Demographics ==
According to the 2011 Census of India, Majdia had a total population of 7,831, of which 4,009 (51%) were males and 3,822 (49%) were females. Population in the age range 0–6 years was 722. The total number of literate persons in Majdia was 5,362 (75.43% of the population over 6 years).

The following municipality and census towns were part of Nabadwip Urban Agglomeration in 2011 census: Nabadwip (M), Char Maijdia (CT), Char Brahmanagar (CT), Bablari Dewanganj (CT), Tiorkhali (CT), Gadigachha (CT) and Majdia.

== Infrastructure ==
According to the District Census Handbook 2011, Nadia, Majdia covered an area of 2.1213 km^{2}. Among the civic amenities, the protected water supply involved tube well, borewell, hand pump. It had 1,200 domestic electric connections, 5 road light points. Among the medical facilities it had 1 dispensary/ health centre, 5 medicine shops. Among the educational facilities it had were 3 primary schools, 1 middle school, nearest secondary, senior secondary schools at Gadigachha 1 km away. Three important commodities it produced were sari, lungi, vegetables.
