= Dhubulia =

- Village
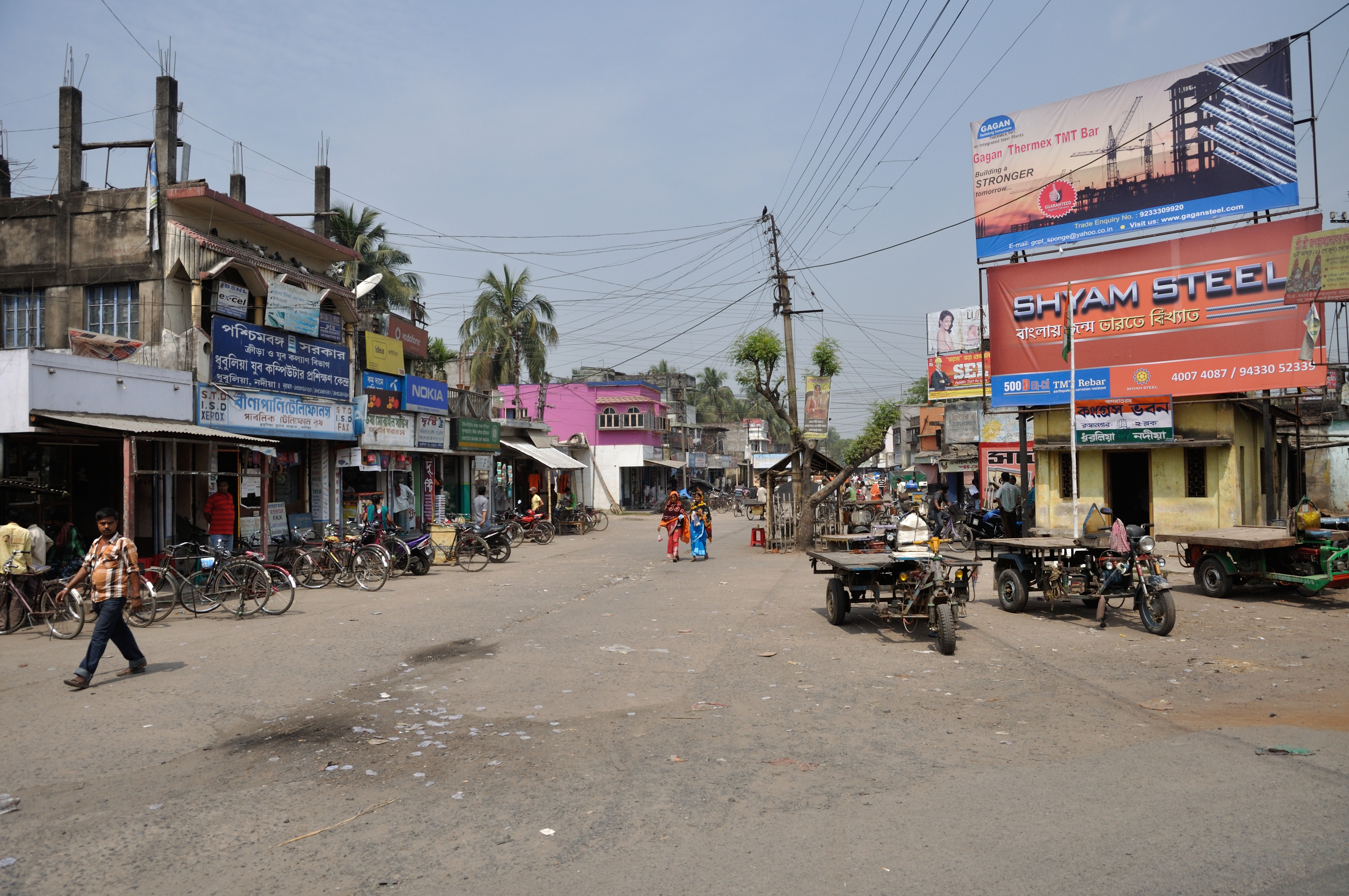
- Dhubulia bazaar area is adjacent to the National Highway 12

- Location in West Bengal, India Dhubulia (India)
- Coordinates: 23.4881900°N 88.4513170°E
- Country: India
- State: West Bengal
- District: Nadia

Population (2011)
  - Total: 11,623

Languages
  - Official: Bengali, English
- Time zone: UTC+5:30 (IST)
- PIN: 741139 (Dhubulia); 741140 (Dhubulia TB Hospital); 741125 (Bahadurpur); 741154 (Ghateswar)
- Telephone/STD code: 03472
- Lok Sabha constituency: Krishnanagar
- Vidhan Sabha constituency: Krishannagar Dakshin
- Website: nadia.gov.in

Dhubulia is a village in the Krishnanagar II CD block in the Krishnanagar Sadar subdivision of the Nadia district of West Bengal, India.

== History ==
Many people from Bangladesh migrated to Dhubulia during the partition of India in 1947 and the Bangladesh Liberation War in 1971. And they started living in Dhubulia Initially, several camps were set up by the government which were referred to by numbers. There are many places today that still use the old number system. During World War II, an army group No. 99 Squadron RAF was based at Dhubulia.

== Geography ==
Cities and towns in Krishnanagr Sadar subdivision of Nadia district
M: municipal town/ city, CT: census town, R: rural/ urban centre, H: place of historical/ religious interest, T: place of tourist interest.
Owing to space constraints in the small map, the actual locations in a larger map may vary slightly

=== Location ===
Dhubulia is located at 23.4881900°N 88.4513170°E. Most of the land is either undeveloped or used for cultivation. Typical crops are rice, wheat, mustard, jute and vegetables.

=== Area overview ===
Nadia district is mostly alluvial plains lying to the east of Hooghly River, locally known as Bhagirathi. The alluvial plains are cut across by such distributaries as Jalangi, Churni and Ichhamati. With these rivers getting silted up, floods are a recurring feature. The Krishnanagar Sadar subdivision, presented in the map alongside, has the Bhagirathi on the west, with Purba Bardhaman district lying across the river. The long stretch along the Bhagirathi has many swamps. The area between the Bhagirathi and the Jalangi, which flows through the middle of the subdivision, is known as Kalantar, a low-lying tract of black clay soil. A big part of the subdivision forms the Krishnanagar-Santipur Plain, which occupies the central part of the district. The Jalangi, after flowing through the middle of the subdivision, turns right and joins the Bhagirathi. On the south-east, the Churni separates the Krishnanagar-Santipur Plain from the Ranaghat-Chakdaha Plain. The east forms the boundary with Bangladesh. The subdivision is moderately urbanized. 20.795% of the population lives in urban areas and 79.205% lives in rural areas.

Note: The map alongside presents some of the notable locations in the subdivision. All places marked in the map are linked in the larger full screen map. All the four subdivisions are presented with maps on the same scale – the size of the maps vary as per the area of the subdivision.

== Civic administration ==
=== Police station ===
Dhubulia police station has jurisdiction over the Krishnanagar II CD block. The total area covered by the police station is 134.74 km^{2} and the population covered is 139,020 (2001 census). 5 km of the India-Bangladesh border is within the PS area.

=== CD block HQ ===
The headquarters of Krishnanagar II CD block are located at Dhubulia.

== Demographics ==
According to the 2011 Census of India, Dhubulia had a total population of 11,623, of which 6,056 (52%) were males and 5,567 (48%) were females. Population in the age range 0–6 years was 1,005. The total number of literate persons in Dhubulia was 8,921 (84.02% of the population over 6 years).

== Economy ==
Many residents are engaged in agriculture and handloom weaving.Traditional tant sarees are also produced in the area.

== Education ==
- Dhubulia Shayama Prasad Shikshayatan High School
- Dhubulia Deshbandhu High School
- Nivedidita Balika Vidyalaya
- Dhubulia Subhas Chandra Valika Vidyalaya
- Nawpara Rupdha High School

== Transport ==
National Highway 12 (or old number National Highway 34) passes through Dhubulia. Dhubulia railway station is situated on Sealdah Lalgola main line.

== Healthcare ==
Dhubulia Rural Hospital, with 30 beds at Dhubulia, is the major government medical facility in the Krishnanagr II CD block.

Dr. B.C.Roy Chest Sanatorium at Dhubulia functions with 1,000 beds.
