= Asannagar =

- Village
- Location in West Bengal, India Asannagar (India)
- Coordinates: 23.39832°N 88.504365°E
- Country: India
- State: West Bengal
- District: Nadia

Government
  - Type: Panchayat
  - Body: Asannagar Gram Panchayat (krishnanagar 1 No. Panchayat Samiti)

Area
  - Total: 5 km^{2} (1.9 sq mi)

Population (2011)
  - Total: 12,794
  - Density: 2,600/km^{2} (6,600/sq mi)

Languages
  - Official: Bengali, English
- Time zone: UTC+5:30 (IST)
- PIN: 741161 (Asannagar)
- Telephone/STD code: 03472
- Vehicle registration: WB51/52
- Lok Sabha constituency: Krishnanagar
- Vidhan Sabha constituency: Krishnanagar Uttar
- Website: nadia.gov.in

Asannagar is a village and a gram panchayat in CD block in the Krishnanagar Sadar subdivision of the Nadia district in the state of West Bengal, India. It was formerly under Kotwali Police Station but now it is under newly formed Bhimpur Police Station.

== History ==
Asannagar is a very old village of the district. Leader of the Indigo revolt and peasant uprising, Biswanath Sardar alias Bishe Dakait was hanged in this village in 1808 after a show trial.

== Geography ==
Cities and towns in Krishnanagr Sadar subdivision of Nadia district
M: municipal town/ city, CT: census town, R: rural/ urban centre, H: place of historical/ religious interest, T: place of tourist interest.
Owing to space constraints in the small map, the actual locations in a larger map may vary slightly

=== Location ===
Asannanagar is located at 23.39832°N 88.504365°E.

=== Area overview ===
Nadia district is mostly alluvial plains lying to the east of Hooghly River, locally known as Bhagirathi. The alluvial plains are cut across by such distributaries as Jalangi, Churni and Ichhamati. With these rivers getting silted up, floods are a recurring feature. The Krishnanagar Sadar subdivision, presented in the map alongside, has the Bhagirathi on the west, with Purba Bardhaman district lying across the river. The long stretch along the Bhagirathi has many swamps. The area between the Bhagirathi and the Jalangi, which flows through the middle of the subdivision, is known as Kalantar, a low-lying tract of black clay soil. A big part of the subdivision forms the Krishnanagar-Santipur Plain, which occupies the central part of the district. The Jalangi, after flowing through the middle of the subdivision, turns right and joins the Bhagirathi. On the south-east, the Churni separates the Krishnanagar-Santipur Plain from the Ranaghat-Chakdaha Plain. The east forms the boundary with Bangladesh. The subdivision is moderately urbanized. 20.795% of the population lives in urban areas and 79.205% lives in rural areas.

Note: The map alongside presents some of the notable locations in the subdivision. All places marked in the map are linked in the larger full screen map. All the four subdivisions are presented with maps on the same scale – the size of the maps vary as per the area of the subdivision.

== Demographics ==
According to the 2011 Census of India, Asannagar had a total population of 12,794, of which 6,500 (51%) were males and 6,294 (49%) were females. The population in the age range 0–6 years of age was 1,151. The total number of literate persons in Asannagar is 8,828 (75.82% of the population over 6 years).

== Transport ==
Asannagar is on State Highway 8 which originates from Santaldih and terminates at Majhdia. Asannagar is only 13 km (8.1 mi) from the district headquarters Krishnanagar, Nadia. The nearest railway stations are Krishnanagar City Junction and Majhdia railway station. Asannagar is easily accessible through local private buses, magic vans, e-rickshaws (toto) from both the stations. Local people also use private cars, bikes, and scooter to commute.

== Education ==
=== Schools ===
- Asannagar High School, established in 1954.
- Bhimpur Sri Sri Darsanananda Vidyaniketan
- Asannagar Board Primary
- Kashipurpara primary school
- Pyradangapara primary school
- Chanderpole Kultala primary school
- Bagdipara primary school
- Naikura primary school
- Kashipur Bansberia primary school

=== Colleges ===
- Bhimpur Mohanananda College Of Education
- Asannagar Madan Mohan Tarkalankar College, established at Asannagar in 2007 affiliated with the University of Kalyani.

== Festivals ==
Durga Puja, Ganesh Puja, Kali Puja, Jagadhatri Puja, Ganga Puja are celebrated here with great rejoice. Lalon Mela is an important fair held here at nearby Kadamkhali ground. It is mainly a cultural fair about Lalon Fakir's songs. Many renowned Baul singers from both India and Bangladesh serves soulful songs in this fair.

== Healthcare ==
There is a primary health centre at Asannagar, with 10 beds.
