= Krishnanagar II =

- Community development block
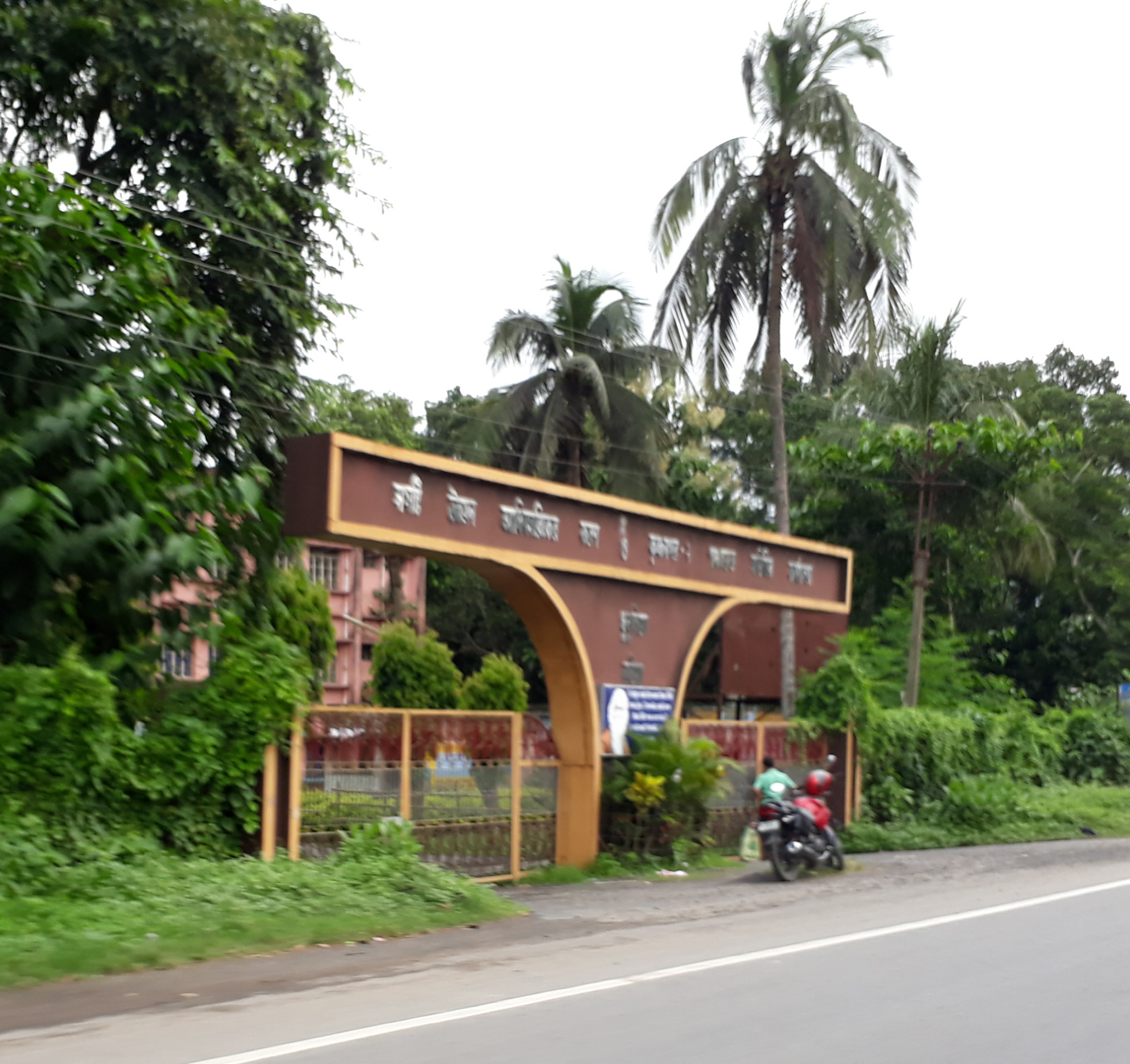
- Krishnanagar-II CD block office

- Coordinates: 23.4881900°N 88.4513170°E
- Country: India
- State: West Bengal
- District: Nadia

Government
  - Type: Community development block

Area
  - Total: 124.37 km^{2} (48.02 sq mi)
- Elevation: 17 m (56 ft)

Population (2011)
  - Total: 139,472
  - Density: 1,121.4/km^{2} (2,904.5/sq mi)

Languages
  - Official: Bengali, English

Literacy (2011)
  - Total literates1: 85,053 (68.52%)
- Time zone: UTC+5:30 (IST)
- PIN: 741139 (Dhubulia); 741125 (Belpukur)
- Telephone/STD code: 03472
- Vehicle registration: WB-51, WB-52
- Lok Sabha constituency: Krishnanagar
- Vidhan Sabha constituency: Krishnanagar Dakshin
- Website: nadia.nic.in

Krishnanagar II is a community development block that forms an administrative division in Krishnanagar Sadar subdivision of Nadia district in the Indian state of West Bengal.

== Geography ==
Dhubulia is located at 23°29′17″N 88°27′05″E.

Krishnanagar II CD Block is bounded by Nakshipara CD Block in the north, Chapra CD Block in the east, Krishnanagar I and Nabadwip CD Blocks in the south and Purbasthali II CD Block in Bardhaman district, across the Hooghly, in the west.

Nadia district is mostly alluvial plains lying to the east of Hooghly River, locally known as the Bhagirathi. The alluvial plains are cut across by such distributaries as the Jalangi, Churni and Ichhamati. With these rivers getting silted up, floods are a recurring feature.

Krishnnagar II CD Block has an area of 124.37 km^{2}. It has 1 panchayat samity, 7 gram panchayats, 103 gram sansads (village councils), 45 mouzas and 44 inhabited villages. Dhubulia police station serves this block. Headquarters of this CD Block is at Dhubulia.

Gram panchayats of Krishnanagar II block/ panchayat samiti are: Belpukur, Dhubulia I, Dhubulia II, Nawpara I, Sonatola II, Sadhanpara I and Sadhanpara II, Bahadurpur.

== Demographics ==
=== Population ===
As per the 2011 Census of India, Krishnagar II CD Block had a population of 139,472, of which 134,032 were rural and 5,440 were urban. There were 71,614 (52%) males and 67,858 (48%) females. Population below 6 years was 15,352. Scheduled Castes numbered 25,563 (18.33%) and Scheduled Tribes numbered 2,292 (1.64%).

As per the 2001 census, Krishnanagar II block had a total population of 124,127, out of which 64,006 were males and 60,121 were females. Krishnagar II block registered a population growth of 17.04 per cent during the 1991-2001 decade. Decadal growth for the district was 19.51 per cent. In 2011 the total population is 5,168,488. Decadal growth in West Bengal was 17.84 per cent.

There is one census town in Krishnanagar II CD Block (2011 census figure in brackets): Harindanga (5,440).

Large villages (with 4,000+ population) in Krishnanagar II CD Block were (2011 census figures in brackets): Rukunpur (4,804), Sonadanga (11,156), Dwipchandrapur (4,209), Tatla (5,036), Noapara (5,705), Sonatala (9,406), Dhubulia (11,026), Chaugachhahansadanga (4,685), Krishna Chandrapur (4,464), Mayakol (4,051) and Bahadurpur (5,455).

Other villages in Krishnanagar II CD Block include (2011 census figures in brackets): Sadhanpara (2,971).

=== Literacy ===
As per the 2011 census, the total number of literates in Krishnanagar II CD Block was 85,053 (68.52% of the population over 6 years) out of which males numbered 46,523 (72.88% of the male population over 6 years) and females numbered 38,530 (63.92% of the female population over 6 years). The gender disparity (the difference between female and male literacy rates) was 8.96%.

See also – List of West Bengal districts ranked by literacy rate

Literacy in CD blocks of
Nadia district
Tehatta subdivision
Karimpur I – 67.70%
Karimpur II – 62.04%
Tehatta I – 70.72%
Tehatta II – 68.52%
Krishnanagar Sadar subdivision
Kaliganj – 65.89%
Nakashipara – 64.86%
Chapra – 68.25%
Krishnanagar I – 71.45%
Krishnanagar II – 68.52%
Nabadwip – 67.72%
Krishnaganj – 72.86%
Ranaghat subdivision
Hanskhali – 80.11%
Santipur – 73.10%
Ranaghat I – 77.61%
Ranaghat II – 79.38%
Kalyani subdivision
Chakdaha – 64.17%
Haringhata – 82.15%
Source: 2011 Census: CD Block Wise
Primary Census Abstract Data

=== Language and religion ===
Religion in Krishnanagar II CD block (2011)
Hinduism	57.02%
Islam	42.84%
Other or not stated	0.14%

In the 2011 census, Hindus numbered 79,530 and formed 57.02% of the population in Krishnanagar II CD Block. Muslims numbered 59,754 and formed 42.84% of the population. Christians numbered 73 and formed 0.05% of the population. Others numbered 115 and formed 0.09% of the population.

In the 2001 census, Hindus numbered 311,840 and formed 77.09% of the combined population of Krisnanagar I and Krishnanagar II CD Blocks. Muslims numbered 90,806 and formed 22.45% of the combined population. In the 1991 census, Hindus numbered 255,189 and formed 77.32% of the combined population of Krishnanagar I and Krishnanagar II CD Blocks. Muslims numbered 73,355 and formed 22.23% of the combined population.

Bengali is the predominant language, spoken by 99.15% of the population.

== Rural poverty ==
The District Human Development Report for Nadia has provided a CD Block-wise data table for Modified Human Vulnerability Index of the district. Krishnanagar II CD Block registered 29.83 on the MHPI scale. The CD Block-wise mean MHVI was estimated at 33.92. A total of 8 out of the 17 CD Blocks in Nadia district were found to be severely deprived when measured against the CD Block mean MHVI - Karimpur I and Karimpur II (under Tehatta subdivision), Kaliganj, Nakashipara, Chapra, Krishnanagar I and Nabadwip (under Krishnanagar Sadar subdivision) and Santipur (under Ranaghat subdivision) appear to be backward.

As per the Human Development Report 2004 for West Bengal, the rural poverty ratio in Nadia district was 28.35%. The estimate was based on Central Sample data of NSS 55th round 1999–2000.

== Economy ==
=== Livelihood ===
In Krishnanagar II CD Block in 2011, amongst the class of total workers, cultivators formed 16.33%, agricultural labourers 35.66%, household industry workers 8.63% and other workers 39.37%.

The southern part of Nadia district starting from Krishnanagar I down to Chakdaha and Haringhata has some urban pockets specialising in either manufacturing or service related economic activity and has reflected a comparatively higher concentration of population but the urban population has generally stagnated. Nadia district still has a large chunk of people living in the rural areas.

=== Infrastructure ===
There are 44 inhabited villages in Krishnanagar II CD Block. 100% villages have power supply and drinking water supply. 13 Villages (29.55%) have post offices. 42 villages (95.45%) have telephones (including landlines, public call offices and mobile phones). 36 villages (81.82%) have a pucca approach road and 30 villages (68.18%) have transport communication (includes bus service, rail facility and navigable waterways). 13 villages (29.55%) have agricultural credit societies and 8 villages (18.18%) have banks. It should, however, be noted that although 100% villages in Nadia district had power supply in 2011, a survey in 2007-08 revealed that less than 50% of households had electricity connection. In rural areas of the country, the tube well was for many years considered to be the provider of safe drinking water, but with arsenic contamination of ground water claiming public attention it is no longer so. Piped water supply is still a distant dream. In 2007–08, the availability of piped drinking water in Nadia district was as low as 8.6%, well below the state average of around 20%.

=== Agriculture ===
Persons engaged in agriculture
in Krishnanagar II CD Block
1. Bargadars (5.72%)
2. Patta holders (9.33%)
3. Small farmers (8.39%)
4. Marginal farmers (36.4%)
5. Agricultural labourers (40.2%)

Although the Bargadari Act of 1950 recognised the rights of bargadars to a higher share of crops from the land that they tilled, it was not implemented fully. Large tracts, beyond the prescribed limit of land ceiling, remained with the rich landlords. From 1977 onwards major land reforms took place in West Bengal. Land in excess of land ceiling was acquired and distributed amongst the peasants. Following land reforms land ownership pattern has undergone transformation. In 2013–14, persons engaged in agriculture in Krishnanagar II CD Block could be classified as follows: bargadars 5.72%, patta (document) holders 9.33%, small farmers (possessing land between 1 and 2 hectares) 8.39%, marginal farmers (possessing land up to 1 hectare) 36.38% and agricultural labourers 40.19%. As the proportion of agricultural labourers is very high, the real wage in the agricultural sector has been a matter of concern.

Krishnanagar II CD Block had 82 fertiliser depots, 12 seed stores and 32 fair price shops in 2013–14.

In 2013–14, Krishnanagar II CD Block produced 9,064 tonnes of Aman paddy, the main winter crop from 3,426 hectares, 12,906 tonnes of Boro paddy (spring crop) from 3,265 hectares, 6,062 tonnes of Aus paddy (summer crop) from 2,586 hectares, 3,764 tonnes of wheat from 1,070 hectares, 69,714 tonnes of jute from 4,172 hectares, 9,783 tonnes of potatoes from 325 hectares and 2,005 tonnes of sugar cane from 20 hectares. It also produced pulses and oilseeds.

In 2013–14, the total area irrigated in Krishnanagar II CD Block was 1,071 hectares, out of which 764 hectares were irrigated by river lift irrigation, 300 hectares by deep tube wells and 7 hectares by shallow tube wells.

=== Banking ===
In 2013–14, Krishnanagar II CD Block had offices of 4 commercial banks and 2 gramin banks.

== Transport ==
Krihnanagar II CD Block has 3 ferry services and 5 originating/ terminating bus services.

The Ranaghat-Lalgola branch line was opened in 1905. It passes through this CD Block.

NH 12 (old number NH 34) passes through this block.

== Education ==
In 2013–14, Krishnanagar II CD Block had 76 primary schools with 6,641 students, 10 middle schools with 1,440 students, 2 high school with 1,476 students and 10 higher secondary schools with 14,276 students. Krishnanagar II CD Block had 1 technical/ professional institutions with 100 students and 207 institutions for special and non-formal education with 8,285 students

In Krishnanagar II CD Block, amongst the 44 inhabited villages, 2 villages did not have any school, 30 had more than 1 primary school, 20 had at least 1 primary and 7 middle school and 16 had at least 1 middle and 1 secondary school.

== Healthcare ==
In 2014, Krishnanagar II CD Block had 1 hospital, 1 block primary health centre and 2 primary health centres with total 540 beds and 5 doctors (excluding private bodies). It had 19 family welfare subcentres. 2,600 patients were treated indoor and 220,191 patients were treated outdoor in the hospitals, health centres and subcentres of the CD Block.

Dhubulia Rural Hospital, with 30 beds at Dhubulia, is the major government medical facility in the Krishnanagr II CD block. There are primary health centres at Noapara (with 10 beds) and Belpur (with 6 beds).

Dr. B.C.Roy Chest Sanatorium at Dhubulia functions with 1,000 beds.

Krishnanagar II CD Block is one of the areas of Nadia district where ground water is affected by moderate level of arsenic contamination. The WHO guideline for arsenic in drinking water is 10 mg/ litre, and the Indian Standard value is 50 mg/ litre. All the 17 blocks of Nadia district have arsenic contamination above this level. The maximum concentration in Krishnanagar II CD Block is 104 mg/litre.
