= Nabadwip State General Hospital =

- West Bengal Government
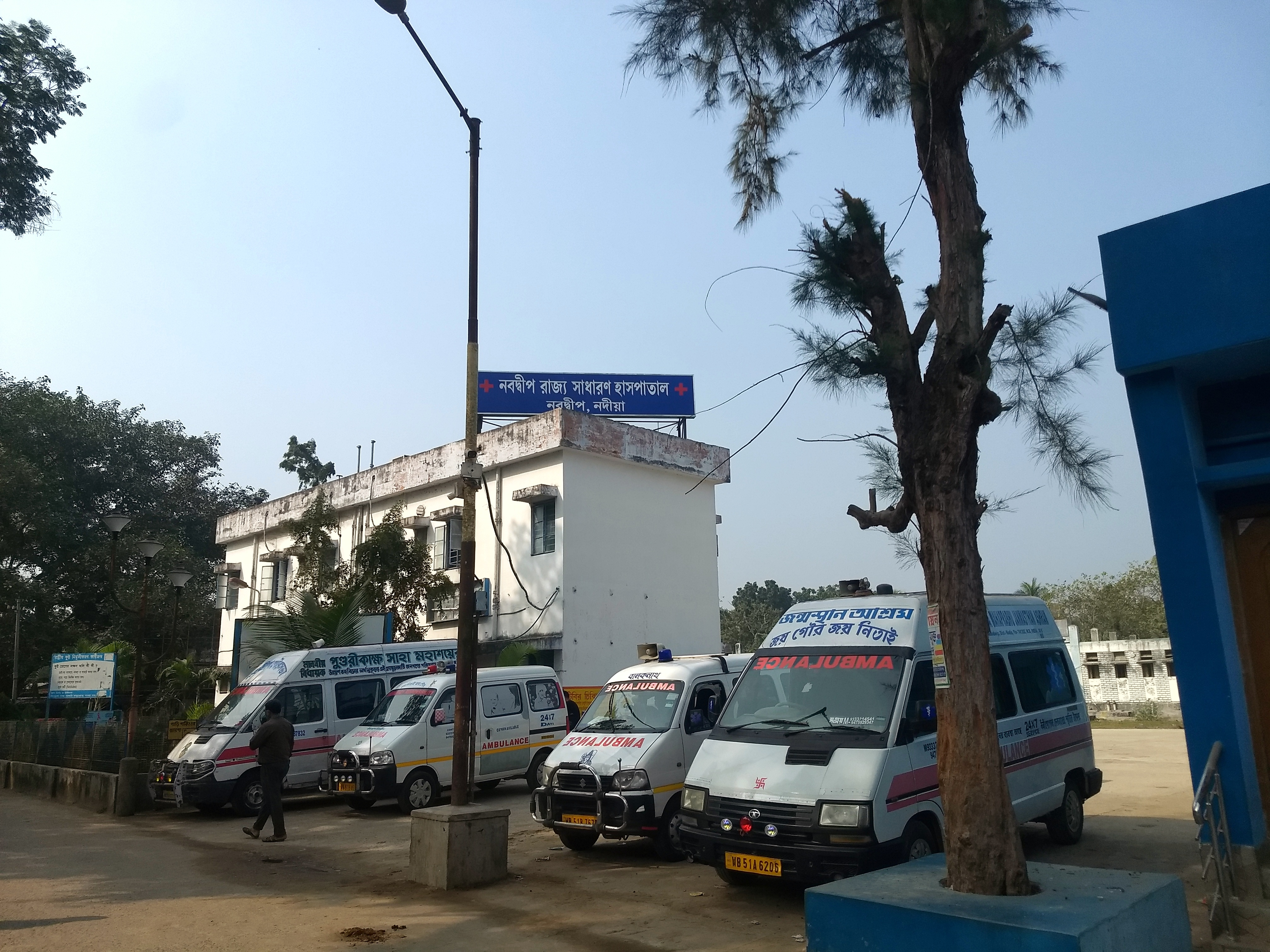
- Nabadwip State General Hospital

Geography
- Location: Nabadwip, Nadia District, West Bengal, India
- Coordinates: 23.424827°N 88.3572076°E

Organisation
- Type: General

Services
- Emergency department: Present
- Beds: 125

History
- Founded: 1897; 129 years ago (as Garrett Hospital)

Nabadwip State General Hospital is the main hospital in Nabadwip. It is the Government hospital of West Bengal, founded in 1897. It was formerly known as the Garrett Hospital. Blood bank service has been started here since 2015.

== History ==
Nabadwip Hospital was established in 1897. The hospital was named as Garrett Hospital after the name of the Nadia District Magistrate J. H. R. Garrett. It was built with the help of the financial support of Nadia Raj Kshitish Chandra Roy, Raja Narendralal Khan of Narazol and Rani Tarasundari Devi. Later, Anandmoy Roy, Sitanath Chowdhury, Debendranath Bagchi, Kishori Dasi, Ranjit Pal Chowdhury and Dr. Manilal Kundu provided special financial assistance for the improvement of the hospital. Brajokrishna Mukherjee was the first assistant surgeon of this hospital. Before the establishment of the hospital, there was a Charitable clinics of Ratnamani Kundu.

== Services ==
At present the number of beds in this hospital is 125. The blood bank service was started on August 14, 2015, at this Nabadwip Hospital. As a result, in addition to the Nabadwip Municipality and Panchayat, several lakhs of people from Vidyanagar, Chandpur, Srirampur, Jahannagar, Bhandartikuri and Purbasthali, adjacent to Nabadwip benefited. Initially the blood bank is opened from 9 am to 2 pm but later it is open till evening according to the demand of common people.
