= Krishnagar Women's College =

- Type: Undergraduate college Public college
- Established: 1958; 68 years ago
- Affiliations: University of Kalyani
- President: Sri Siddhartha Majumdar
- Principal: Dr. Natasha Dasgupta
- Location: Aurobindo Sarani, Krishnagar, West Bengal, 741101, India; 23.4097349°N 88.4774427°E
- Campus: Urban
- Website: Krishnagar Women's College
- Location in West Bengal Krishnagar Women's College (India)

Krishnagar Women's College, established in 1958, is a women's college in Krishnagar, in Nadia district, West Bengal, India. It offers undergraduate courses in arts and sciences. It is affiliated to the University of Kalyani. Manabi Bandopadhyay, India's first openly transgender college principal, began work as such as the principal of Krishnagar Women's College in 2015.

== Departments ==
=== Science ===
- Chemistry
- Physics
- Mathematics

=== Arts ===
- Bengali
- English
- Sanskrit
- History
- Geography
- Political Science
- Philosophy
- Economics

== Accreditation ==
The college is recognized by the University Grants Commission (UGC). It was accredited by the National Assessment and Accreditation Council (NAAC), and in 2016 awarded B+ grade, an accreditation that has since then expired.

== See also ==
- List of institutions of higher education in West Bengal
- Education in India
- Education in West Bengal
- Krishnagar Government College
