= Harindanaga =

- Village
- Location in West Bengal Location in India
- Coordinates: 22.0354°N 88.3233°E
- Country: India
- State: West Bengal
- District: South 24 Parganas
- CD Block: Mathurapur I

Area
  - Total: 1.02 km^{2} (0.39 sq mi)
- Elevation: 7 m (23 ft)

Population (2011)
  - Total: 1,436
  - Density: 1,410/km^{2} (3,650/sq mi)

Languages
  - Official: Bengali
  - Additional official: English
- Time zone: UTC+5:30 (IST)
- PIN: 743399
- Telephone code: +91 3174
- Vehicle registration: WB-19 to WB-22, WB-95 to WB-99
- Lok Sabha constituency: Mathurapur (SC)
- Vidhan Sabha constituency: Raidighi
- Website: www.s24pgs.gov.in

Harindanaga is a village within the jurisdiction of the Mathurapur police station in the Mathurapur I CD block in the Diamond Harbour subdivision of the South 24 Parganas district in the Indian state of West Bengal.

== Geography ==
Harindanaga is located at 22°02′07″N 88°19′24″E. It has an average elevation of 7 metres (23 ft).

== Demographics ==
As per 2011 Census of India, Harindanaga had a total population of 1,436.

== Transport ==
A stretch of a local road links Harindanaga to the State Highway 1.

== Healthcare ==
Mathurapur Rural Hospital at Mathurapur, with 60 beds, is the major government medical facility in the Mathurapur I CD block.
