= Nadia district =

District in West Bengal, India

Nadia district নদীয়া জেলা
- District of West Bengal
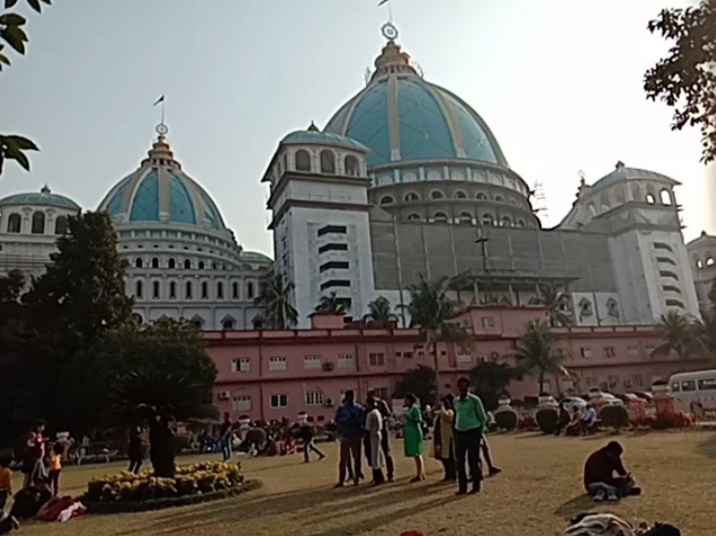
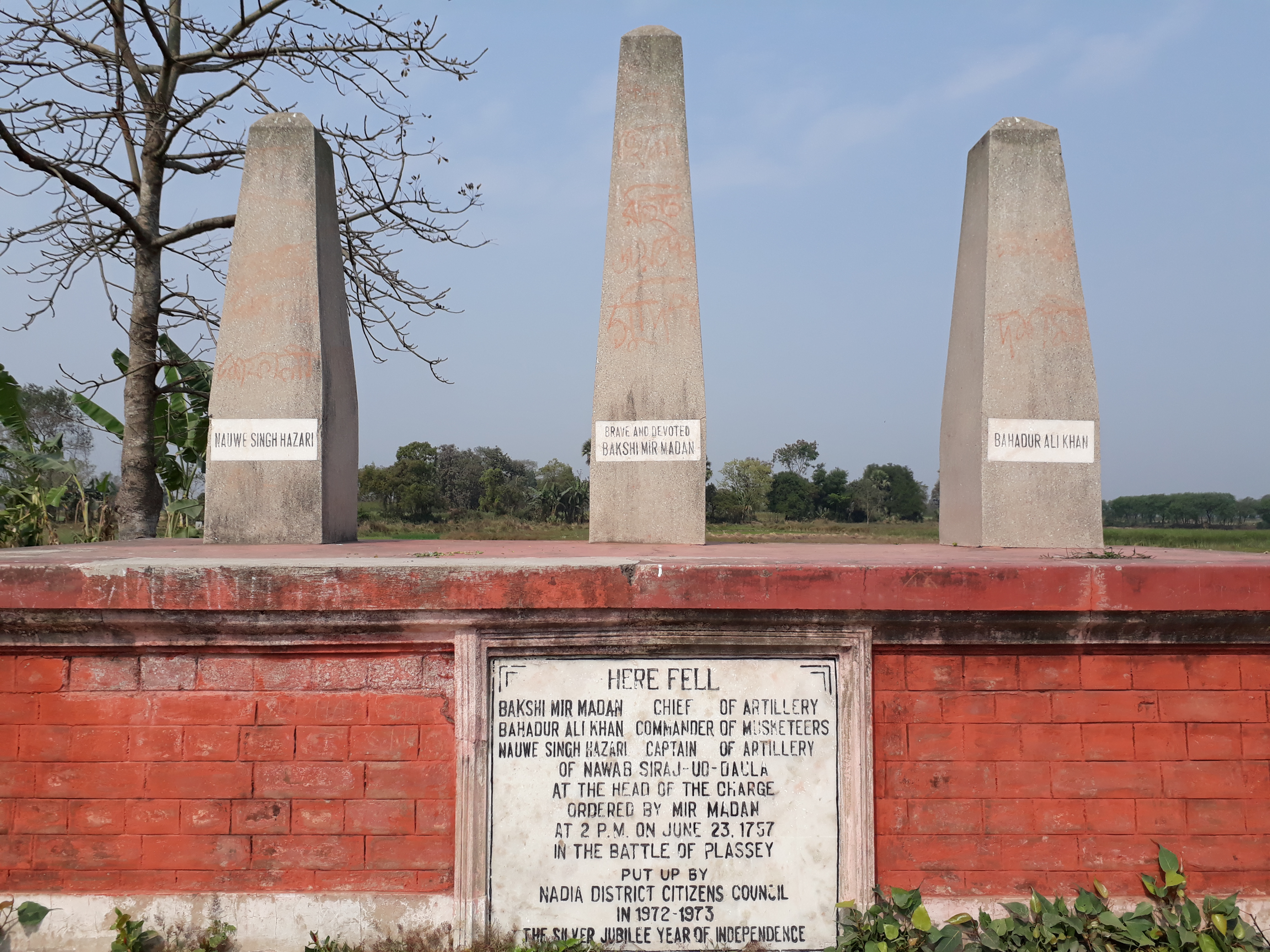
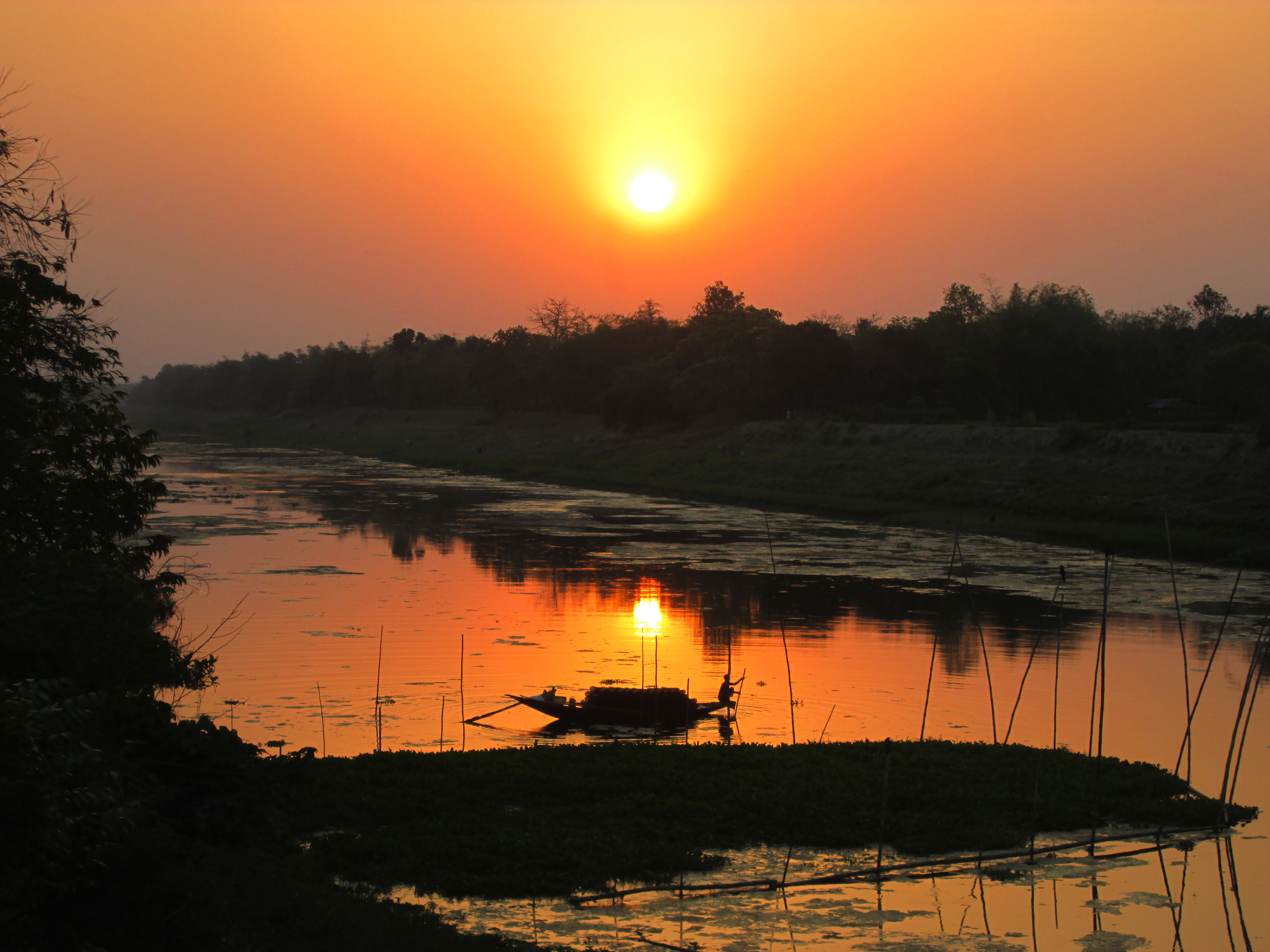
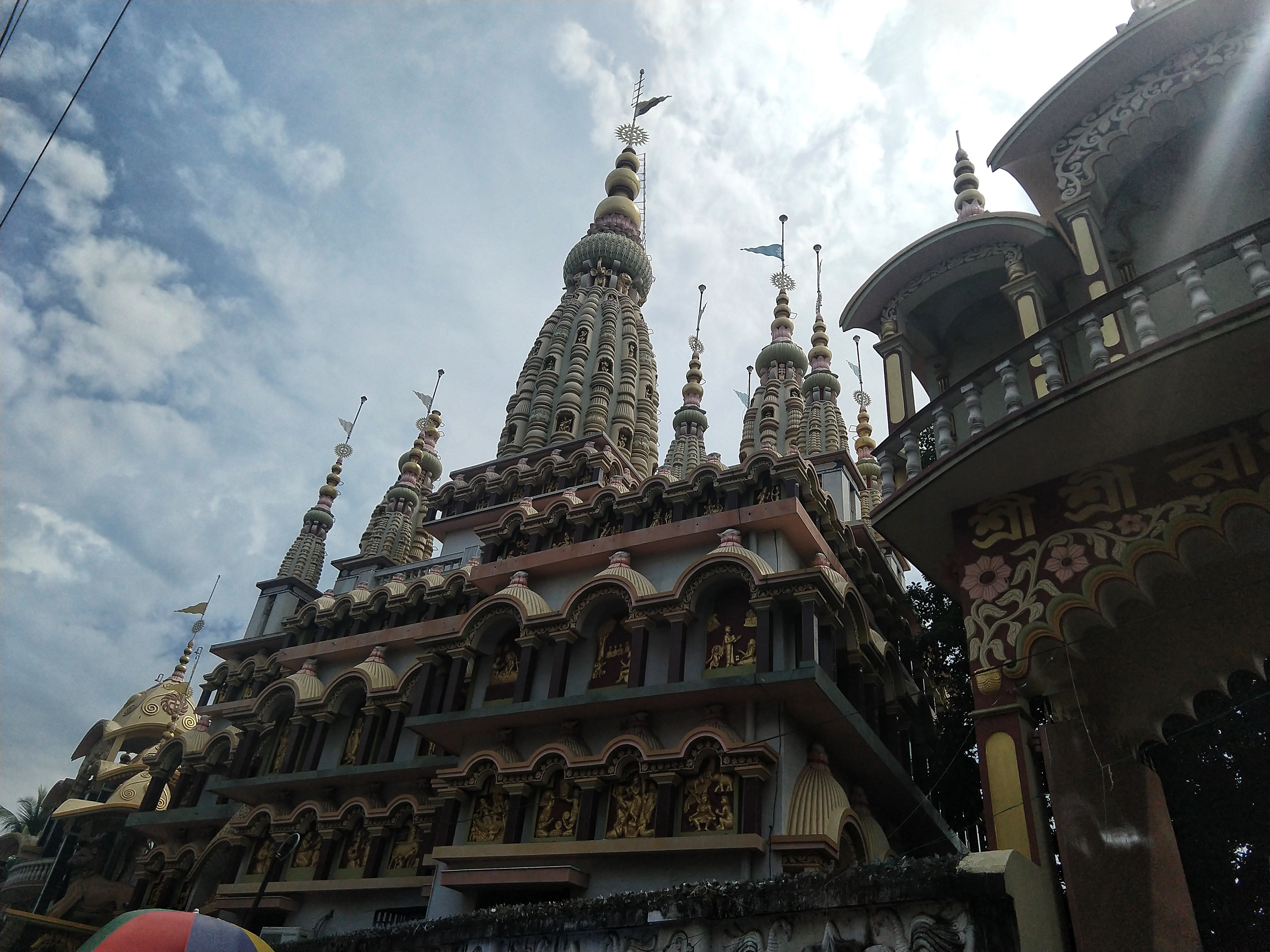
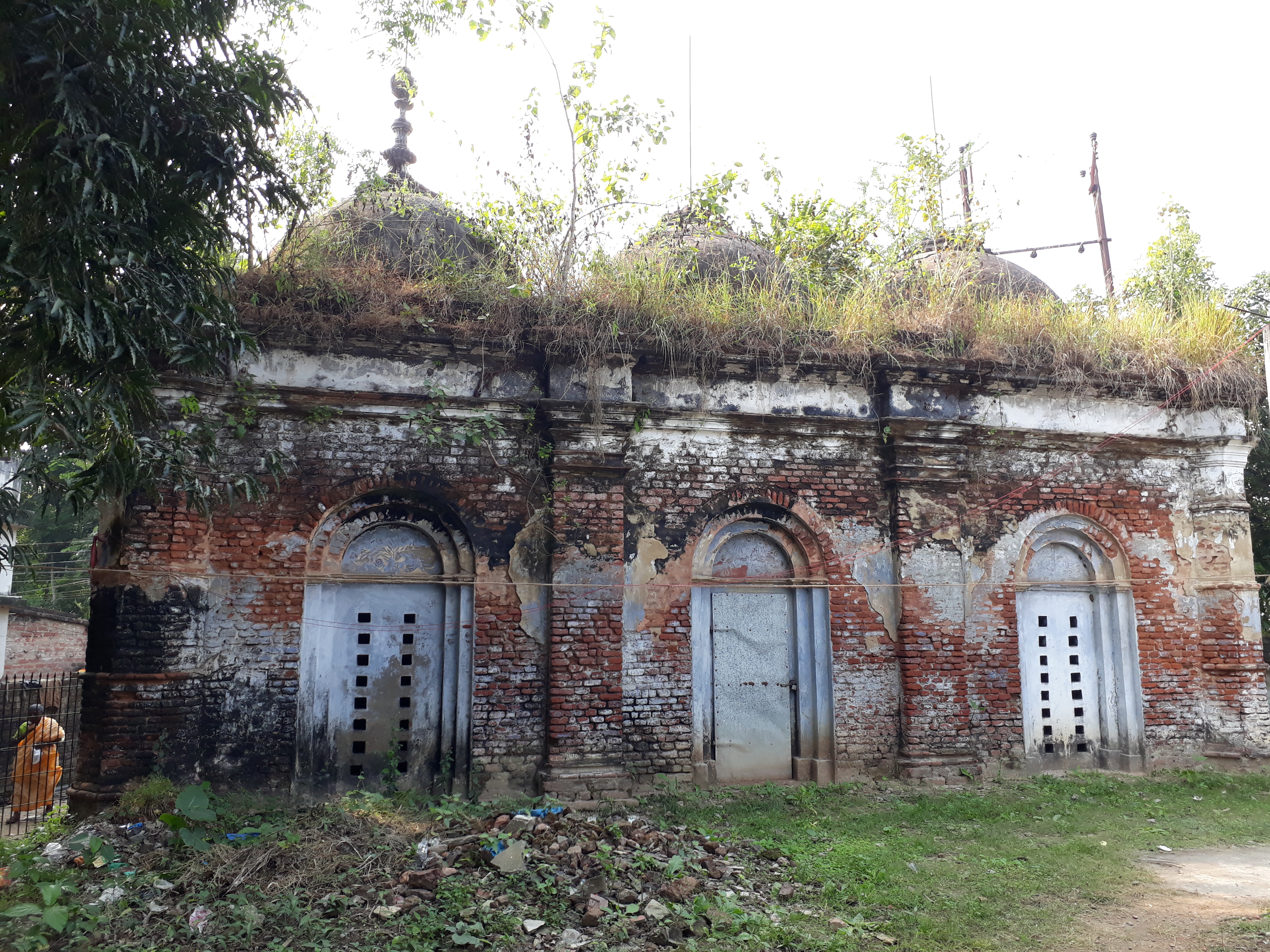
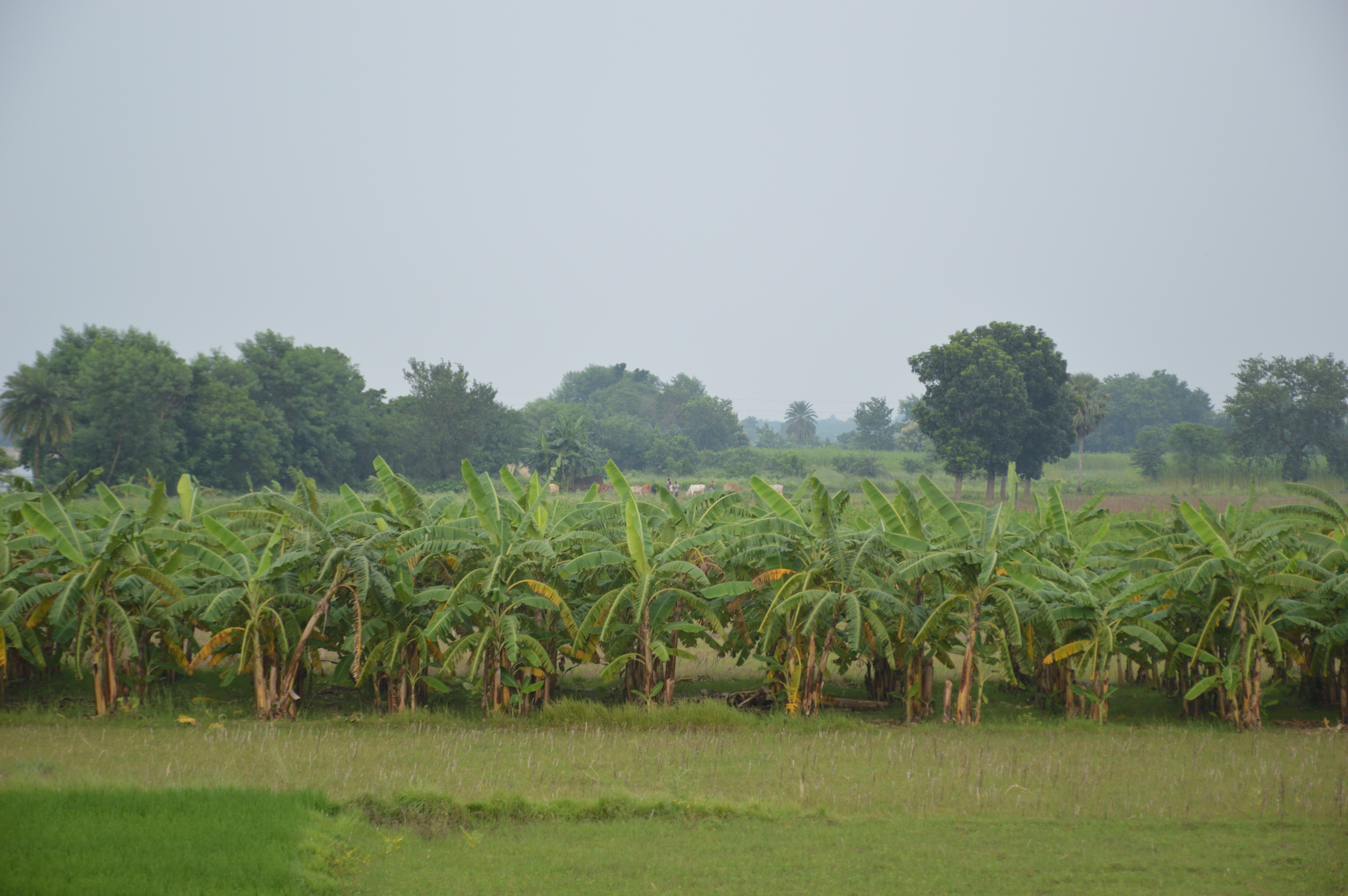
- Clockwise from top-left: Mayapur ISKCON temple, Memorial to the Bengali commanders at Palashi, Jalangi river near Palashipara, Chakdah Masjid, Banana plantation in Bhaktanagar, Somaj Bari Temple in Nabadwip
- Interactive Map Outlining Nadia District
- Location of Nadia district in West Bengal
- Coordinates: 23°29′N 88°32′E
- Country: India
- State: West Bengal
- Division: Presidency
- Headquarters: Krishnanagar

Government
  - Subdivisions: Krishnanagar Sadar, Kalyani, Ranaghat, Tehatta
  - CD Blocks: Kaliganj, Nakashipara, Chapra, Krishnanagar I, Krishnanagar II, Nabadwip, Krishnaganj, Chakdaha, Haringhata, Hanskhali, Santipur, Ranaghat I, Ranaghat II, Karimpur I, Karimpur II, Tehatta I, Tehatta II
  - Lok Sabha constituencies: Krishnanagar, Ranaghat, Bangaon, Murshidabad
  - Vidhan Sabha constituencies: Karimpur, Tehatta, Palashipara, Kaliganj, Nakashipara, Chapra, Krishnanagar Uttar, Nabadwip, Krishnanagar Dakshin, Santipur, Ranaghat Uttar Paschim, Krishnaganj, Ranaghat Uttar Purba, Ranaghat Dakshin, Chakdaha, Kalyani, Haringhata

Area
  - Total: 3,927 km^{2} (1,516 sq mi)

Population (2011)
  - Total: 5,167,600
  - Density: 1,316/km^{2} (3,408/sq mi)
  - Urban: 1,438,873

Demographics
  - Literacy: 75.58 per cent
  - Sex ratio: 947 ♂/♀

Languages
  - Official: Bengali
  - Additional official: English
- Time zone: UTC+05:30 (IST)
- Website: nadia.gov.in

Nadia district (Bengali pronunciation: [nod̪ia]) is a district in the Indian state of West Bengal. It lies in the Presidency division. It borders Bangladesh to the east, North 24 Parganas and Hooghly districts to the south, Purba Bardhaman to the west, and Murshidabad to the north.

Nadia district is highly influential in the cultural history of Bengal. The standard form of modern Bengali, developed in the 19th century, is based on the dialect spoken around Shantipur region of Nadia. Known as the "Oxford of Bengal", Nabadwip made many contributions to Indian philosophy through Sanskrit and Vedic learning in Nadia, such as the Navya-Nyaya system of logic, and is the birthplace of the Vaishnava saint Chaitanya Mahaprabhu. The district is still largely agricultural.

== Etymology ==
"Nadia" is a shortened name for a historic city in the district. Nabadwip, literally "new island", was formerly an island created by alluvial deposits of the Ganga.

== Geography ==
Nadia district is located in southern West Bengal, in the west-central Bengal region. The district is largely an alluvial plain, formed by the constant shifting of the various rivers of the Ganges Delta. To the west of the district is the Bhagirathi (or Hooghly) river, which was once the main distributary of the Ganga towards the Bay of Bengal, and is still considered to be the continuation of the Ganga for Hindus. As the main flow of the Ganga ran east into the Padma, the Bhagirathi largely dried up. Most of the rivers flowing through Nadia now have little water in them. Nearly all the district has been converted into farmland.

=== Rivers ===
Nadia district is home to many rivers. The Padma, now the main distributary of the Ganga, touches the district on its northeastern end.

The Jalangi, which flows from Murshidabad district, forms much of the northwestern border of the district with Murshidabad, before flowing south into Nadia district. Around Krishnanagar, it turns west and flows into the Bhagirathi near Nabadwip.

The Mathabhanga originates in the far northeast of the district and forms part of the border with Bangladesh. It then flows into Bangladesh until it, again forming part of the border, re-enters the district at Gede. At Maijdia, it splits into the Churni and Ichamati. The Churni flows southwest and merges with the Bhagirathi at Shibpur near Ranaghat. The Ichamati flows into Bangladesh near Mubarakpur and re-enters India near Duttaphulia. It then flows south into the North 24 Parganas district.

== History ==
Nabadwip, an ancient town within Nadia district, is often referred to as the "Oxford of Bengal". One of the Indian schools of logic (Tarka sastra) called Navya Nyaya system was developed in Nabadwip, which produced great logicians in the 15th century. Nabadwip was an important seat of political power and the capital of Bengal under Ballal Sen and later Lakshman Sen, kings of the Sena Empire, who ruled from 1159 to 1206. In 1202, Nabadwip was captured by Bakhtiyar Khilji. This victory paved the way for Muslim rule in Bengal. The British defeated Siraj ud-Daulah, Nawab of Bengal, at Palashi in this district. The 1859 revolt against European Indigo planters started from the village of Chaugacha, by Digambar Biswas and Bishnu Charan Biswas in Krishnanagar, Nadia. Nadia is thought to have had trade relations with Tibet, Nepal and Bhutan.

On 15 August 1947, the Indian Independence Act 1947 came into force, and for the next two days, Nadia, along with Murshidabad, Malda, and West Dinajpur (present-day North Dinajpur and South Dinajpur) due to the Muslim majority, was part of the Dominion of Pakistan (specifically East Bengal or East Pakistan, which seceded as Bangladesh in 1971). On 17 August 1947, the final boundary adjustment of the Radcliffe Commission transferred these districts to the Dominion of India (specifically West Bengal), to ensure the Hooghly River was entirely within India and to maintain connectivity between Kolkata and Guwahati through Darjeeling district. But, later Nadia and West Dinajpur became Hindu-majority districts due to the arrival of a large number of Bengali Hindu refugees from East Bengal of Pakistan during the 1947 and Bangladesh (East Bengal) liberation war in 1971.

Pre-independence Nadia had five subdivisions: Krishnagar Sadar, Ranaghat, Kushtia, Meherpur and Chuadanga . A large part of Nadia, except Nabadwip initially, was included into East Bengal (now Bangladesh) due to it being a Muslim majority district in the 1941 census of British India. Because of heavy protests, rectification was made, and on the night of August 17, 1947, Ranaghat, Krishnanagar, Shikarpur in Karimpur, and Plassey were placed in India. Before independence, the district had a total of 25 thanas, out of which 13 thanas were given to India and the rest to Pakistan, i.e., Krishnanagar, having 5 thanas; Ranaghat Subdivision, having 5 thanas; Karimpur and Tehatta from the Meherpur subdivision; and Krishnaganj from the Chuadanga subdivision. Since then some parts of this district have been celebrating Independence Day on August 17 and August 18.

Nadia district is also historically significant as the birthplace of Chaitanya Mahaprabhu, a revered figure in Hinduism. He was born in Nabadwip, a town in the Nadia district, on the full moon night of 18 February 1486. Known as Gauranga for his molten gold-like complexion, Chaitanya Mahaprabhu is considered an avatar of Lord Krishna by his followers. He founded Gaudiya Vaishnavism and popularized the chanting of the Hare Krishna Maha-mantra. His birthplace, known as Yogpeeth in Mayapur, is a major pilgrimage site for devotees.

== Governance ==
Administration of the district

=== District administration ===
The District of Nadia has its headquarters at Krishnanagar town. The British district of Nadia was formed in 1787. The present district of Nadia, after partition was formed by Notification No.545-GA dated 23 February 1948. The District Administration is headed by the District Magistrate & District Collector, Nadia.

=== Administrative subdivisions ===
The district comprises four subdivisions: Krishnanagar Sadar, Kalyani, Ranaghat and Tehatta. Krishnanagar is the district headquarters. There are 19 police stations, 2 women's and 1 cyber crime police station, 18 community development blocks, 11 municipalities, 187 gram panchayats (3114 sets), and 2639 villages in this district.

Other than the municipality area, each subdivision contains community development blocks which in turn are divided into rural areas and census towns. In total there are 26 urban units: 9 municipalities and 15 census towns and two notified areas. Ranaghat, Aistala, Satigachha, Nasra and Cooper's Camp together form the Ranaghat urban agglomeration. Nabadwip, Char Maijdia and Char Brahmanagar forms Nabadwip UA. Chakdaha, Gopalpur and Parbbatipur forms Chakdaha UA. Krishnanagar and Badkulla together form Krishnanagar UA. Birnagar, Phulia and Taherpur together form Birnagar UA.

CD blocks and other localities in Nadia district
Krishnanagar Sadar	Kalyani	Ranaghat	Tehatta
Kaliganj	Chakdaha	Hanskhali	Karimpur I
Nakashipara	Kalyani	Santipur	Karimpur II
Chapra	Haringhata	Ranaghat I	Tehatta I
Krishnanagar I	Chakdaha (M)	Ranaghat II	Tehatta II
Krishnanagar II	Kalyani (M)	Shantipur (M)	
Nabadwip	Gayespur (M)	Ranaghat (M)	
Krishnaganj	Haringhata (M)	Birnagar (M)	
Krishnangar (M)		Taherpur (NA)	
Nabadwip (M)		Cooper's Camp (NA)	

=== Assembly constituencies ===
The district is divided into 17 assembly constituencies, which are part of four Lok Sabha constituencies.

No.	Constituency	Lok Sabha	MLA	2026 Winner	2024 Lead
77	Karimpur	Murshidabad	Samarendranath Ghosh	Bharatiya Janata Party	Trinamool Congress
78	Tehatta	Krishnanagar	Subrata Kabiraj	Bharatiya Janata Party	Bharatiya Janata Party
79	Palashipara	Krishnanagar	Rukbanur Rahman	Trinamool Congress	Trinamool Congress
80	Kaliganj	Krishnanagar	Alifa Ahmed	Trinamool Congress	Trinamool Congress
81	Nakashipara	Krishnanagar	Shantanu Dey	Bharatiya Janata Party	Trinamool Congress
82	Chapra	Krishnanagar	Jeber Sekh	Trinamool Congress	Trinamool Congress
83	Krishnanagar Uttar	Krishnanagar	Tarak Nath Chatterjee	Bharatiya Janata Party	Bharatiya Janata Party
84	Nabadwip	Ranaghat (SC)	Srutisekhar Goswami	Bharatiya Janata Party	Trinamool Congress
85	Krishnanagar Dakshin	Krishnanagar	Sadhan Ghosh	Bharatiya Janata Party	Bharatiya Janata Party
86	Santipur	Ranaghat (SC)	Swapan Kumar Das	Bharatiya Janata Party	Bharatiya Janata Party
87	Ranaghat Uttar Paschim	Ranaghat (SC)	Parthasarathi Chatterjee	Bharatiya Janata Party	Bharatiya Janata Party
88	Krishnaganj (SC)	Ranaghat (SC)	Sukanta Biswas	Bharatiya Janata Party	Bharatiya Janata Party
89	Ranaghat Uttar Purba (SC)	Ranaghat (SC)	Ashim Biswas	Bharatiya Janata Party	Bharatiya Janata Party
90	Ranaghat Dakshin (SC)	Ranaghat (SC)	Ashim Kumar Biswas	Bharatiya Janata Party	Bharatiya Janata Party
91	Chakdaha	Ranaghat (SC)	Bankim Chandra Ghosh	Bharatiya Janata Party	Bharatiya Janata Party
92	Kalyani (SC)	Bangaon (SC)	Anupam Biswas	Bharatiya Janata Party	Bharatiya Janata Party
93	Haringhata (SC)	Bangaon (SC)	Ashim Kumar Sarkar	Bharatiya Janata Party	Bharatiya Janata Party

=== Lok Sabha Constituencies ===
The district encompasses four Lok Sabha constituencies completely or partially.

S No.	Lok Sabha Constituency	Member of Parliament	Party
11	Murshidabad	Abu Taher Khan	Nationalist Citizens Party of India
12	Krishnanagar	Mahua Moitra	Trinamool Congress
13	Ranaghat (SC)	Jagannath Sarkar	Bharatiya Janata Party
14	Bangaon (SC)	Shantanu Thakur	Bharatiya Janata Party

== Demographics ==
Historical population
Year	Pop.	±% p.a.
1901	771,672	—
1911	774,459	+0.04%
1921	710,455	−0.86%
1931	720,944	+0.15%
1941	840,303	+1.54%
1951	1,142,686	+3.12%
1961	1,711,830	+4.12%
1971	2,223,911	+2.65%
1981	2,964,253	+2.92%
1991	3,852,097	+2.65%
2001	4,604,827	+1.80%
2011	5,167,600	+1.16%

According to the 2011 census Nadia district has a population of 5,167,600, roughly equal to the US state of Colorado. This gives it a ranking of 18th in India (out of a total of 640). The district has a population density of 1,316 inhabitants per square kilometre (3,410/sq mi) . Its population growth rate over the decade 2001-2011 was 12.24%. Nadia has a sex ratio of 947 females for every 1000 males, and a literacy rate of 75.58%. 27.84% of the population lives in urban areas. Scheduled Castes and Scheduled Tribes make up 29.93% and 2.72% of the population respectively. Bengali is the predominant language, spoken by 98.02% of the population.

Religion in Nadia district (2011)
Hinduism	72.15%
Islam	26.76%
Christianity	0.65%
Other or not stated	0.44%

=== Religion ===
Religion in Nadia district (2011 census)
1. Hinduism (72.2%)
2. Islam (26.8%)
3. Christianity (0.65%)
4. No religion (0.08%)
5. Sikhism (0.02%)
6. Buddhism (0.01%)
7. Jainism (0.01%)
8. Other religions (0.33%)

Religion in present-day Nadia district
Religion	1941		1951		1961		2001		2011	
Religion	Pop.	%	Pop.	%	Pop.	%	Pop.	%	Pop.	%
Islam	430,704	51.26%	256,017	22.36%	417,706	24.38%	1,170,282	25.41%	1,382,682	26.76%
Hinduism	392,225	46.68%	881,955	77.03%	1,284,173	74.95%	3,396,095	73.75%	3,728,482	72.15%
Tribal religion	10,332	1.23%	11	~0%	—N/a	—N/a	—N/a	—N/a	—N/a	—N/a
Christianity	6,632	0.79%	5,885	0.51%	10,840	0.63%	29,563	0.64%	33,835	0.65%
Others (Note: Including Jainism, Christianity, Buddhism, Zoroastrianism, Judaism, Ad-Dharmis, or not stated)	410	0.04%	1,056	0.10%	605	0.04%	8,887	0.20%	22,601	0.44%
Total Population	840,303	100%	1,144,924	100%	1,713,324	100%	4,604,827	100%	5,167,600	100%

As per the 2011 Census, Hinduism is the majority religion of the district, followed by 73.15% of the population. Hinduism became majority in the district after Independence, when Nadia became the destination for millions of refugees from East Pakistan, and from Bangladesh after 1971.

Over 90% of Muslims live in rural areas. Muslims are majority in Karimpur II (60.38%), Kaliganj (58.51%), Nakashipara (54.06%), and Chapra (59.72%) CD blocks. Muslims are a significant minority in Tehatta II (47.89%), Krishnanagar II (42.84%), and Nabadwip (35.20%).

CD Block	Hindu %	Muslim %	Other %
Karimpur I	67.77	31.95	0.28
Karimpur II	39.52	60.38	0.10
Tehatta I	68.95	29.21	1.84
Tehatta II	52.00	47.89	0.11
Kaliganj	41.36	58.51	0.13
Nakashipara	46.53	53.06	0.41
Chapra	37.15	59.72	3.13
Krishnanagar I	82.78	15.25	0.14
Krishnanagar II	57.02	42.84	0.41
Nabadwip	64.39	35.20	1.97
Krishnaganj	93.98	5.86	0.16
Hanskhali	87.98	11.39	0.63
Santipur	86.45	11.85	1.7
Ranaghat I	93.82	5.67	0.51
Ranaghat II	85.65	12.59	1.76
Chakdaha	83.66	14.65	1.69
Haringhata	73.09	26.19	0.72
Area not under any sub-district	93.32	5.50	1.18

== Flora and fauna ==
In 1980, Nadia district became home to the Bethuadahari Wildlife Sanctuary, which has an area of 0.7 km^{2} (0.3 mi^{2}).

== Education ==
=== University ===
- Bidhan Chandra Krishi Viswavidyalaya
- Kalyani University
- Indian Institute of Information Technology Kalyani
- Indian Institute of Science Education and Research, Kolkata
- Maulana Abul Kalam Azad University of Technology
- West Bengal University of Animal and Fishery Sciences
- All India Institute of Medical Sciences, Kalyani
- National Institute of Biomedical Genomics

=== College ===
- Tehatta Government College, Tehatta
- Kaliganj Government College, Debagram
- Karimpur Pannadevi College, Karimpur
- Srikrishna College, Bagula
- Sudhiranjan Lahiri Mahavidyalaya, Majhdia
- Santipur College, Santipur
- Indian Institute of Handloom Technology, Fulia
- Industrial Training Institute, Fulia
- Ranaghat College, Ranaghat
- Ranaghat Government Polytechnic, Ranaghat
- Nabadwip Vidyasagar College, Nabadwip
- Krishnagar Government College, Krishnanagar
- Krishnagar Women's College, Krishnanagar
- Haringhata Mahavidyalaya, Haringhata
- Dwijendralal College, Krishnanagar
- Dr. B.R. Ambedkar College, Betai
- Chakdaha College, Chakdaha
- Plassey College, Plassey
- Pritilata Waddedar Mahavidyalaya, Panikhali
- Bipradas Pal Chowdhury Institute of Technology, Krishnanagar
- Mirmadan Mohanlal Government Polytechnic, Plassey
- Asannagar Madan Mohan Tarkalankar College, Asannagar
- Bethuadahari College, Bethuadahri
- Chapra Bangaljhi Mahavidyalaya, Chapra
- Chapra Government College, Chapra
- Muragacha Government College, Muragachha
- Kalyani Mahavidyalaya, Kalyani
- Kalyani Government Engineering College, Kalyani
- College of Medicine & JNM Hospital, Kalyani

=== Private college ===
- JIS College of Engineering, Kalyani
- Ideal Institute of Engineering, Kalyani
- Krishnanagar Institute of Medical Science, Krishnanagar
- Nabadwip School and College of Nursing, Nabadwip

=== Schools ===
- Krishnagar Collegiate School, Krishnanagar
- Krishnanagar Government Girls' High School, Krishnanagar
- Kendriya Vidyalaya BSF Krishnanagar, Krishnanagar
- Nabadwip Hindu School, Nabadwip
- Nabadwip Bakultala High School, Nabadwip
- Nabadwip Tarasundari Girl's High School,Nabadwip
- Nabadwip Jatiya Vidyalaya, Nabadwip
- Nabadwip Balika Vidyalaya, Nabadwip
- Santipur Muslim High School, Santipur
- Bethuadahari J.C.M High School, Bethuadahari
- Dignagar High School, Dignagar
- Birnagar High School, Birnagar
- Taherpur Netaji High School, Taherpur
- Asannagar High School, Asannagar
- Palashipara Mahatma Gandhi Smriti Vidyapith, Palashipara
- Bidhan Chandra Memorial Government Girls' High School, Kalyani
- C.M.S St. John's High School, Krishnanagar
- Dhubulia Desh Bandhu High School, Dhubulia

== Transport ==
=== Rail ===
- Nabadwip Dham is 65 km from Bandel, 105 km from Howrah and 112 km from Sealdah on the Bandel-Katwa-Azimganj (B.A.K Loop Line) section of Eastern Railway. It has three Railway Stations as Nabadwip Dham railway station (NDAE), Bishnupriya (VSPR) of Howrah Division and Nabadwip Ghat (NDF) of Sealdah Division.
- Krishnanagar City Junction is 100 km from Sealdah on the Sealdah-Lalgola Section of Eastern Railway.
- Kalinarayanpur Junction is 78 km from Sealdah on the Sealdha-Lalgola section of Eastern Railway.
- Ranaghat Junction is 74 km from Sealdah on the Sealdah-Lalgola Section of Eastern Railway.
- Kalyani Junction is 48 km from Sealdah on the Sealdah-Lalgola Section of Eastern Railway.

== Notable people ==
- Madanmohan Tarkalankar, Bengali Renaissance, Poet
- Chaitanya Mahaprabhu, Bengali Hindu mystic, saint, proponent of Bhakti yoga and Achintya Bheda Abheda philosophy
- Rani Rashmoni, Zamindar and philanthropist
- Gagan Chandra Biswas, Indian industrialist, engineer and Zamindar
- Satyendra Nath Bose, Indian mathematician and physicist specializing in theoretical physics
- Sourindra Mohan Sircar, Indian botanist, plant physiologist
- Jagadananda Roy, Science fiction writer
- Suresh Biswas, adventurer
- Sharat Kumar Roy, Indian American geologist, first Indian to go in an expedition to North pole
- Basanta Kumar Biswas, independence revolutionary and martyr
- Dwijendralal Ray, poet, playwright and lyricist
- Krittibas Ojha, medieval Bengali poet
- Soumitra Chatterjee, actor, dramatist
- Joy Goswami, poet and essayist
- Rakhee Gulzar, actress.
- Jhulan Goswami, cricketer
- Ramtanu Lahiri, social reformer
- Prabhat Kumar Mukhopadhyaya, a Bengali author best known for his biography of Rabindranath Tagore
- Anantahari Mitra, Bengali revolutionary
- Haripada Chattopadhyay, freedom fighter and Member of Parliament
- Bikash Roy, Indian actor and filmmaker
- Subhash Mukhopadhyay, poet
- Jagannath Majumdar, independence revolutionary and politician
- Sudhir Chakraborty, educator
- Jyotirmoyee Sikdar, athlete
- Azizul Haque (educator), advocate, diplomat
- Soma Biswas, athlete
- Ujjwal Maulik, Professor and computer scientist
- Hemanta Kumar Sarkar, philologist, author, leader of Freedom Movement
- Dr. Sudhir Chakraborty, educationist and essayist
- Swadhin Kumar Mandal, Indian Chemist and Shanti Swarup Bhatnagar Prize for Science and Technology awardee
- Mohammad Mozammel Huq, poet, journalist
- Gopal Bhar, courtier and jester
- Jatindramohan Bagchi, poet, editor
- Narayan Sanyal, writer and civil engineer
- Asim Duttaroy, a Medical Scientist

== See also ==
- Nadia District (1787-1947)
- Hooghly
- Purba Bardhaman
- North 24 Pargana
