= Topla, Nadia =

Coordinates: 22°14′N 80°53′E

Topla
- Village
- Interactive map of Topla
- Country: India
- State: West Bengal
- District: Nadia district

Population (2011)
  - Total: 7,178
- Time zone: UTC+5.30 (Indian Standard Time)
- Pin: 741165

Topla is a village under the Karimpur II Community Development Block and Narayanpur II gram panchayat at Tehatta subdivision, in Nadia district, in the state of West Bengal. Thanapara police station serves the area.

== Demographics ==
As per the 2011 Census of India, Topla had a total population of 7178, of which 3708 (51.65%) were males and 3470 (48. 35%) were females. Population below 6 years was 867. The total number of literates in Topla were 3747 (52%)

== Area and population ==
Topla has a total population of 7178 peoples as per census 2011. There are about 1886 houses in Topla village. This village situated under the Tehatta (Vidhan Sabha constituency) and near the bank of Jalangi River.

== Education ==
There are four primary schools, one SSK and two MSK School in Topla village but no secondary school is there. Topla Primary School is one of the oldest primary school of the district. Dr. B.R. Ambedkar College in Betai is the nearest college of the area. As per report in 2011, literacy rate of Topla village was 52%, compared to 76.26% of the state.

== Transport ==
This village situated beside the Nazirpur- Karimpur road. District Headquarters Krishnanagar is approximately 63 km away from this village and is connected by bus through the State Highway 11 (West Bengal) via Nazirpur and Tehatta. Nearest railway station is Plassey which is near about 35 km.
