= Kishorpur =

- Village
- Location of Kishorpur Kishorpur (India)
- Coordinates: 23.8921°N 88.5448°E
- Country: India
- State: West Bengal
- District: Nadia district

Area
  - Land: 668.98 ha (1,653.1 acres)

Population (2011)
  - Total: 4,035
  - Density: 603.2/km^{2} (1,562/sq mi)
- Time zone: UTC+5.30 (Indian Standard Time)
- Pin: 741165

Kishorpur is a village under the Karimpur II Community Development Block in Tehatta subdivision of Nadia district in the state of West Bengal. Nandanpur is the gram panchayat of Kishorpur village. This village is under the Karimpur police station.

This is an old village where Indian National Congress leader and Indian Member of Parliament, Lok Sabha Smt. Ila Pal Choudhury established a Kuthi bari.

== Geography ==
Cities and towns in Tehatta subdivision of Nadia district
CT: census town, R: rural/ urban centre.
Owing to space constraints in the small map, the actual locations in a larger map may vary slightly

=== Location ===
Kishorpur is located at 23.8921°N 88.5448°E.

=== Area overview ===
Nadia district is mostly alluvial plains lying to the east of Hooghly River, locally known as Bhagirathi. The alluvial plains are cut across by such distributaries as Jalangi, Churni and Ichhamati. With these rivers getting silted up, floods are a recurring feature. The Tehatta subdivision, presented in the map alongside, is topographically part of the Nadia Plain North. The Jalangi River forms the district/ subdivision border in the north-western part and then flows through the subdivision. The other important rivers are Mathabhanga and Bhairab. The eastern portion forms the boundary with Bangladesh. The subdivision is overwhelmingly rural. 97.15% of the population lives in the rural areas and 2.85% lives in the urban areas.

Note: The map alongside presents some of the notable locations in the subdivision. All places marked in the map are linked in the larger full screen map. All the four subdivisions are presented with maps on the same scale – the size of the maps vary as per the area of the subdivision.

== Demographics ==
As per the 2011 Census of India, Kishorpur had a total population of 4,035, of which 2,081 (52%) were males and 1,954 (48%) were females. Population below 6 years was 351. The total number of literates in Kishorpur was 2,592 (70.36% of the population over 6 years).

== Area and population ==
The total geographical area of village is 668.98 hectares. Kishorpur has a total population of 4,035 peoples as per census 2011. There are about 1,082 houses in Kishorpur village. This village situated under the Palashipara (Vidhan Sabha constituency) and near the bank of Jalangi River.

== Education ==
There are few primary schools in Kishorpur village but no secondary school is there. Dr. B.R. Ambedkar College in Betai is the nearest college of the area. In this village the literacy rate was not up to mark compared to the state of West Bengal. In 2011, literacy rate of Kishorpur village was 70.36% compared to 76.26% of the state. In Kishorpur Male literacy stands at 73.53% whereas female literacy rate was 66.95%.

== Transport ==
This village situated beside the Nazirpur - Natidanga - Karimpur road. District Headquarters Krishnanagar is approximately 69 km away from this village and is connected by bus through the State Highway 11 (West Bengal) via Nazirpur and Tehatta. Nearest railway station is Plassey railway station which is near about 38 km.
