= Taranipur =

- Village
- Location in West Bengal, India Taranipur (India)
- Coordinates: 23.70°N 88.55°E
- Country: India
- State: West Bengal
- District: Nadia

Government
  - Body: Patharghata GP-II

Population (2011)
  - Total: 7,162

Languages
  - Official: Bengali, English
- Time zone: UTC+5:30 (IST)
- PIN: 741103
- Telephone code: 91 3471
- Sex ratio: 971 females/1000 males
- Lok Sabha constituency: Krishnanagar
- Vidhan Sabha constituency: Palshipara

Taranipur is a village in Patharghata Gram Panchayat-II in Tehatta I CD Block in Tehatta subdivision of Nadia district. It is situated in between the river Jalangi and the border of Bangladesh.

== Demographics ==
As per the 2011 Census of India, Taranipur Village has a total population of 7,162, of which 3,633 (51.73%) is males and 3,529 (49.27%) is females. The total number of literates in Tarnipur is 4,350(60.74% of the population over 6 years).

== Transport ==
Krishnagar-Karimpur road or SH 11, running through the Taranipur village.
