= Chanderghat =

Village in the West Bengal, India

Chanderghat is a village under the Tehatta subdivision of the Nadia district in the Indian state of West Bengal. It belongs to Tehatta I CD block. The village situated near the border of Bangladesh and India besides the Jalangi river. District headquarters Krishnagar is the nearest town and railway station to Chanderghat which is approximately 45 km away.

== Blocks ==
Chanderghat belongs to Tehatta–I CD block. The block is a rural area consisting of 11 gram panchayats: Betai–I, Chhitka, Patharghata–I, Shyamnagar, Betai–II, Kanainagar, Patharghata–II, Tehatta, Chanderghat, Natna and Raghunathpur. There is no urban area in this block. The Tehatta police station serves the Tehatta I block.

== Education ==
This village has a lower literacy rate compared to the state. As shown in the 2011 census, the literacy rate of Chanderghat was 69.03% compared to 76.26% of the State of West Bengal. Male literacy stands at 69.85% and female literacy rate was 68.19%. There is a higher secondary school named Chanderghat High School as well as a girls high school. The Shahid Satish Sardar Primary School was established in 1956 in the memory of Indian freedom fighter Satish Sardar.
