= Satish Sardar =

Bengali revolutionary (1902–1932)

- Born: 1902; Chanderghat, Nadia district, West Bengal
- Died: 19 June 1932 (aged 29–30)
- Other name: Satish Chandra Sardar
- Known for: Indian Freedom Fighter

Satish Sardar or Satish Chandra Sardar (1902 — 19 June 1932) was a Bengali revolutionary and martyr of the civil disobedience movement in Bengal.

== Early life ==
Satish Sardar was born in British India at Chanderghat village presently in Tehatta subdivision, Nadia. His father was Brajaraj Sardar. The No-Tax movement was started as part of the Civil Disobedience Movement in 1932 and was first initiated in Chanderghat village on 13 April 1932. Sardar joined the movement.

== Death ==
On 19 June 1932, the District committee conference of the Indian National Congress was called in Tehatta and the police declared a curfew in this area. Sardar was going to raise a tricolour flag at the police station when the police fired on him. He died that day. At Chanderghat, a primary School was established in 1956 in his memory.
