= Hogalbaria =

- Village
- Location in West Bengal, India Hogalbaria (India)
- Coordinates: 24.037667°N 88.701111°E
- Country: India
- State: West Bengal
- District: Nadia

Languages
  - Official: Bengali, English
- Time zone: UTC+5:30 (IST)
- Lok Sabha constituency: Murshidabad
- Vidhan Sabha constituency: Karimpur
- Website: nadia.gov.in

Hogalbaria is a village in the Karimpur I CD block in the Tehatta subdivision of the Nadia district in the state of West Bengal, India. The village is situated near the Indo-Bangladesh border.

== Geography ==
Cities and towns in Tehatta subdivision of Nadia district
CT: census town, R: rural/ urban centre.
Owing to space constraints in the small map, the actual locations in a larger map may vary slightly

=== Location ===
Hogalberia is located at 24.037667°N 88.701111°E.

=== Area overview ===
Nadia district is mostly alluvial plains lying to the east of Hooghly River, locally known as Bhagirathi. The alluvial plains are cut across by such distributaries as Jalangi, Churni and Ichhamati. With these rivers getting silted up, floods are a recurring feature. The Tehatta subdivision, presented in the map alongside, is topographically part of the Nadia Plain North. The Jalangi River forms the district/ subdivision border in the north-western part and then flows through the subdivision. The other important rivers are Mathabhanga and Bhairab. The eastern portion forms the boundary with Bangladesh. The subdivision is overwhelmingly rural. 97.15% of the population lives in the rural areas and 2.85% lives in the urban areas.

Note: The map alongside presents some of the notable locations in the subdivision. All places marked in the map are linked in the larger full screen map. All the four subdivisions are presented with maps on the same scale – the size of the maps vary as per the area of the subdivision.

== Civic administration ==
=== Police station ===
Hogalbaria police station has jurisdiction over a portion of the Karimpur I CD block. The total area covered by the police station is 122.5 km^{2} and the population covered is 183,556 (2011 census). 14 km of the Bangladesh-India border is within the PS area – 9.5 km has fencing and the rest is Padma River.

== Education ==
Hogalbaria Adarsha Sikshaniketan was established in 1959 as a Bengali-medium co-educational school with classes from V to XII.

== Transport ==
State Highway 11 passes near the village. Hogalbaria is connected with district headquarters, Krishnagar, by regular bus services. The road distance between Krishnagar and Hogalbaria is 88 km.
