= Mahish Bathan =

- Village
- Location in West Bengal, India Mahish Bathan (India)
- Coordinates: 23.943167°N 88.614778°E
- Country: India
- State: West Bengal
- District: Nadia

Population (2011)
  - Total: 9,831

Languages
  - Official: Bengali, English
- Time zone: UTC+5:30 (IST)
- PIN: 741165 (Nazirpur)
- Telephone/STD code: 03471
- Lok Sabha constituency: Murshidabad
- Vidhan Sabha constituency: Karimpur
- Website: nadia.gov.in

Mahish Bathan is a village in Karimpur II CD Block under Tehatta subdivision of Nadia district in the state of West Bengal, India.

== Demographics ==
As per the 2011 Census of India, Mahish Bathan had a total population of 9,831, of which 5, 054 (51%) were males and 4,777 (49%) were females. Population below 6 years was 965. The total number of literates in Mahish Bathan was 5,948 (67.09% of the population over 6 years).

== Transport ==
SH 11, running from Mahammad Bazar (in Birbhum district) to Ranaghat (in Nadia district) passes through Mahish Bathan.
