= Uttampur, Nadia =

Uttampur
- Census Town
- Location in West Bengal, India Uttampur (India)
- Coordinates: 23.9936°N 88.6407°E
- Country: India
- State: West Bengal
- District: Nadia

Area
  - Total: 3.4612 km^{2} (1.3364 sq mi)

Population (2011)
  - Total: 13,000
  - Density: 3,800/km^{2} (9,700/sq mi)

Languages
  - Official: Bengali, English
- Time zone: UTC+5:30 (IST)
- PIN: 741152
- Telephone/STD code: 03471
- Lok Sabha constituency: Murshidabad
- Vidhan Sabha constituency: Karimpur
- Website: nadia.gov.in

Uttampur is a census town in the Karimpur I CD block in the Tehatta subdivision of the Nadia district in the state of West Bengal, India.

== Geography ==
Cities and towns in Tehatta subdivision of Nadia district
CT: census town, R: rural/ urban centre.
Owing to space constraints in the small map, the actual locations in a larger map may vary slightly

=== Location ===
Uttampur is located at 23.9936°N 88.6407°E.

=== Area overview ===
Nadia district is mostly alluvial plains lying to the east of Hooghly River, locally known as Bhagirathi. The alluvial plains are cut across by such distributaries as Jalangi, Churni and Ichhamati. With these rivers getting silted up, floods are a recurring feature. The Tehatta subdivision, presented in the map alongside, is topographically part of the Nadia Plain North. The Jalangi River forms the district/ subdivision border in the north-western part and then flows through the subdivision. The other important rivers are Mathabhanga and Bhairab. The eastern portion forms the boundary with Bangladesh. The subdivision is overwhelmingly rural. 97.15% of the population lives in the rural areas and 2.85% lives in the urban areas.

Note: The map alongside presents some of the notable locations in the subdivision. All places marked in the map are linked in the larger full screen map. All the four subdivisions are presented with maps on the same scale – the size of the maps vary as per the area of the subdivision.

== Demographics ==
According to the 2011 Census of India, Uttampur had a total population of 13,000, of which 6,627 (51%) were males and 6,373 (49%) were females. Population in the age range 0–6 years was 1,113. The total number of literate persons in Uttampur was 9,640 (81.80% of the population over 6 years).

== Infrastructure ==
According to the District Census Handbook 2011, Nadia, Uttampur covered an area of 3.4612 km^{2}. Among the civic amenities, it had 10 km roads with open drain, the protected water supply involved BWT, tap water from treated sources, hand pumps. It had 3,750 domestic electric connections, 247 road lighting points. Among the medical facilities it had 1 dispensary/ health centre, 1 family welfare centre, 4 medicine shops. Among the educational facilities it had were 4 primary schools, 1 middle school, 1 secondary school, 1 senior secondary school. It had 1 non-formal education centre (Sarva Siksha Abhiyan), 2 special schools for disabled. Among the social, recreational and cultural facilities it had 1 orphanage, 2 working women's hostels, 1 cinema theatre, 1 public library, 1 reading room. Three important commodities it produced were jute, paddy, wheat. It had the branch office of 1 agricultural credit society.
