= Karimpur I =

- Community development block
- Coordinates: 23°58′46″N 88°37′19″E
- Country: India
- State: West Bengal
- District: Nadia

Government
  - Type: Community development block

Area
  - Total: 215.78 km^{2} (83.31 sq mi)
- Elevation: 22 m (72 ft)

Population (2011)
  - Total: 183,556
  - Density: 850.66/km^{2} (2,203.2/sq mi)

Languages
  - Official: Bengali, English

Literacy (2011)
  - Total literates: 111,716 (67.70%)
- Time zone: UTC+5:30 (IST)
- PIN: 741152 (Karimpur); 741158 (Shikarpur) 741158(kechuadanga)
- Telephone/STD code: 03471
- Vehicle registration: WB-51, WB-52
- Lok Sabha constituency: Murshidabad
- Vidhan Sabha constituency: Karimpur
- Website: nadia.nic.in

Karimpur I is a community development block that forms an administrative division in Tehatta subdivision of Nadia district in the Indian state of West Bengal.

== Geography ==
Karimpur is located at 23°58′46″N 88°37′19″E.

Karimpur I CD Block is bounded by Jalangi and Domkal CD Blocks, in Murshidabad district, in the north, Daulatpur Upazila in Kushtia District of Bangladesh in the east, Karimpur II CD Block in the south and Naoda CD Block, in Murshidabad district, in the west.

Nadia district is mostly alluvial plains lying to the east of Hooghly River, locally known as Bhagirathi. The alluvial plains are cut across by such distributaries as Jalangi, Churni and Ichhamati. With these rivers getting silted up, floods are a recurring feature.

Karimpur I CD Block has an area of 215.78 km^{2}. It has 1 panchayat samity, 8 gram panchayats, 144 gram sansads (village councils), 73 mouzas and 65 inhabited villages. Karimpur and Hogalbaria police stations serve this block. Headquarters of this CD Block is at Baruipara.

Gram panchayats of Karimpur I block/ panchayat samiti are: Harekrishnapur, Hogalbaria, Jamsherpur, Karimpur I, Karimpur II, Madhugari, Pipulbaria and Shikarpur.

== Demographics ==
=== Population ===
As per the 2011 Census of India, Karimpur I CD Block had a total population of 183,556, of which 160.895 were rural and 5,867 were urban. There were 94,571 (52%) males and 88,985 (48%) females. The population below 6 years was 18,539. Scheduled Castes numbered 32,054 (17.46%) and Scheduled Tribes numbered 5,867 (3.20%).

As per the 2001 census, Karimpur I block had a total population 166,763, out of which 86,260 were males and 80,503 were females. Karimpur I block registered a population growth of 15.97 per cent during the 1991-2001 decade. Decadal growth for the district was 19.51 per cent. Decadal growth in West Bengal was 17.84 per cent.

There were two census towns in Karimpur CD Block (2011 census population in brackets): Karimpur (9,661), Uttampur (13,000).

Large villages (with 4,000+ population) in Karimpur CD Block (2011 census population figures in brackets): Durlabhpur (4,182), Madhugari (5,356), Andhar Kotha (15,244), Sundalpur (5,303), Jamsherpur (6,689), Gabrudanga (4,365), Senpara (5,432), Pakabutahuda (8,933), Baruipara (9,942), Kechuadanga (7,191) and Anandpur (4,081).

Other villages in Karimpur I CD Block include (2011 census figures in brackets): Harekrishnapur (3,295) and Pipulbaria (3,574).

=== Literacy ===
As per the 2011 census, the total number of literates in Karimpur I CD Block was 111,716 (67.70% of the population over 6 years) out of which males numbered 59,368 (69.82% of the male population over 6 years) and females numbered 52,348 (65.44% of the female population over 6 years). The gender disparity (the difference between female and male literacy rates) was 4.38%.

See also – List of West Bengal districts ranked by literacy rate

Literacy in CD blocks of
Nadia district
Tehatta subdivision
Karimpur I – 67.70%
Karimpur II – 62.04%
Tehatta I – 70.72%
Tehatta II – 68.52%
Krishnanagar Sadar subdivision
Kaliganj – 65.89%
Nakashipara – 64.86%
Chapra – 68.25%
Krishnanagar I – 71.45%
Krishnanagar II – 68.52%
Nabadwip – 67.72%
Krishnaganj – 72.86%
Ranaghat subdivision
Hanskhali – 80.11%
Santipur – 73.10%
Ranaghat I – 77.61%
Ranaghat II – 79.38%
Kalyani subdivision
Chakdaha – 64.17%
Haringhata – 82.15%
Source: 2011 Census: CD Block Wise
Primary Census Abstract Data

=== Language and religion ===
Religion in Karimpur I CD block (2011)
| Hinduism | 68.00% |
| Islam | 31.70% |
| Other or not stated | 0.30% |

In the 2011 census, Hindus numbered 124,403 and formed 67.77% of the population in Karimpur I CD Block. Muslims numbered 58,646 and formed 31.95% of the population. Christians numbered 370 and formed 0.21% of the population. Others numbered 137 and formed 0.07% of the population.

In the 2001 census, Hindus numbered 195,736 and formed 54.57% of the combined population of Karimpur I and Karimpur II CD Blocks. Muslims numbered 162,357 and formed 45.27% of the combined population. In the 1991 census, Hindus numbered 173,914 and formed 56.65% of the combined population of Karimpur I and Karimpur II CD Blocks. Muslims numbered 132,729 and formed 43.24% of the combined population.

Bengali is the predominant language, spoken by 98.51% of the population.

== Rural poverty ==
The District Human Development Report for Nadia has provided a CD Block-wise data table for Modified Human Vulnerability Index of the district. Karimpur I CD Block registered 36.56 on the MHPI scale. The CD Block-wise mean MHVI was estimated at 33.92. A total of 8 out of the 17 CD Blocks in Nadia district were found to be severely deprived when measured against the CD Block mean MHVI - Karimpur I and Karimpur II (under Tehatta subdivision), Kaliganj, Nakashipara, Chapra, Krishnanagar I and Nabadwip (under Krishnanagar Sadar subdivision) and Santipur (under Ranaghat subdivision) appear to be backward.

As per the Human Development Report 2004 for West Bengal, the rural poverty ratio in Nadia district was 28.35%. The estimate was based on Central Sample data of NSS 55th round 1999–2000.

== Economy ==
=== Livelihood ===
In Karimpur I CD Block in 2011, amongst the class of total workers, cultivators formed 23.26%, agricultural labourers 48.38%, household industry workers 3.53% and other workers 24.84%. The southern part of Nadia district starting from Krishnanagar I down to Chakdaha and Haringhata has some urban pockets specialising in either manufacturing or service related economic activity and has reflected a comparatively higher concentration of population but the urban population has generally stagnated. Nadia district still has a large chunk of people living in the rural areas.

=== Infrastructure ===
There are 65 inhabited villages in Karimpur I CD Block. 100% villages have power supply and drinking water supply. 15 Villages (23.08%) have post offices All 65 villages have telephones (including landlines, public call offices and mobile phones). 43 villages (66.15%) have a pucca approach road and 45 villages (69.23%) have transport communication (includes bus service, rail facility and navigable waterways). 15 villages (23.08%) have agricultural credit societies and 7 villages (10.77%) have banks. It should, however, be noted that although 100% villages in Nadia district had power supply in 2011, a survey in 2007-08 revealed that less than 50% of households had electricity connection. In rural areas of the country, the tube well was for many years considered to be the provider of safe drinking water, but with arsenic contamination of ground water claiming public attention it is no longer so. Piped water supply is still a distant dream. In 2007–08, the availability of piped drinking water in Nadia district was as low as 8.6%, well below the state average of around 20%.

=== Agriculture ===
Persons engaged in agriculture
in Karimpur I CD Block
1. Bargadars (8.55%)
2. Patta holders (8.93%)
3. Small farmers (4.61%)
4. Marginal farmers (19.9%)
5. Agricultural labourers (58.0%)

Although the Bargadari Act of 1950 recognised the rights of bargadars to a higher share of crops from the land that they tilled, it was not implemented fully. Large tracts, beyond the prescribed limit of land ceiling, remained with the rich landlords. From 1977 onwards major land reforms took place in West Bengal. Land in excess of land ceiling was acquired and distributed amongst the peasants. Following land reforms land ownership pattern has undergone transformation. In 2013–14, persons engaged in agriculture in Karimpur I CD Block could be classified as follows: bargadars 8.55%, patta (document) holders 8.93%, small farmers (possessing land between 1 and 2 hectares) 4.61%, marginal farmers (possessing land up to 1 hectare) 19.88% and agricultural labourers 58.03%. As the proportion of agricultural labourers is very high, the real wage in the agricultural sector has been a matter of concern.

Karimpur I CD Block had 230 fertiliser depots, 27 seed stores and 45 fair price shops in 2013–14.

In 2013–14, Karimpur I CD Block produced 7,578 tonnes of Aman paddy, the main winter crop from 2,902 hectares, 1,021 tonnes of Boro paddy (spring crop) from 276 hectares, 1,528 tonnes of Aus paddy (summer crop) from 752 hectares, 25,592 tonnes of wheat from 8,268 hectares and 321,672 tonnes of jute from 14,127 hectares. It also produced pulses and oilseeds.

In 2013–14, the total area irrigated in Karimpur I CD Block was 784 hectares, out of which 102 hectares were irrigated by river lift irrigation and 682 hectares by deep tube wells.

=== Banking ===
In 2013–14, Karimpur I CD Block had offices of 5 commercial banks and 2 gramin banks.

== Transport ==
Karimpur I CD Block has 2 ferry services and 4 originating/ terminating bus routes. The nearest railway station is 58 km from CD Block headquarters.

SH 11, running from Mahammad Bazar (in Birbhum district) to Ranaghat (in Nadia district) passes through this CD Block.

== Education ==
In 2013–14, Karimpur I CD Block had 96 primary schools with 8,467 students, 9 middle schools with 1,280 students, 2 high school with 1,342 students and 12 higher secondary schools with 18,635 students. Karimpur I CD Block had 1 general college with 4,254 students, 4 technical/ professional institutions with 400 students and 329 institutions for special and non-formal education with 9,765 students.

In Karimpur I CD Block, amongst the 65 inhabited villages, 5 had no school, 29 had more than 1 primary school, 33 had at least 1 primary school, 27 had at least 1 primary and 1 middle school and 13 had at least 1 middle and 1 secondary school.

Karimpur Pannadevi College was established at Karimpur in 1968. The establishment of the college was possible with the zeal of Dr. Nalinaksha Sanyal, a scholar and politician, and the generous contribution of Durga Prasad Agrawal, a local businessman. It is affiliated to the University of Kalyani. It offers honours courses in English, Bengali, history, political science, philosophy, geography, physics, chemistry, mathematics and accountancy. Some of the courses are self-financing.

== Healthcare ==
In 2014, Karimpur I CD Block had 1 rural hospital, 2 primary health centres and 2 private nursing home with total 75 beds and 7 doctors (excluding private bodies). It had 27 family welfare subcentres. 12,317 patients were treated indoor and 345,329 patients were treated outdoor in the hospitals, health centres and subcentres of the CD Block.

Karimpur Rural Hospital, with 50 beds at Karimpur, is the major government medical facility in the Karimpur I CD block. There are primary health centres at Sikarpur (with 10 beds) and Bagchi Jamsherpur (with 10 beds).

Karimpur I CD Block is one of the areas of Nadia district where ground water is affected by high level of arsenic contamination. The WHO guideline for arsenic in drinking water is 10 mg/ litre, and the Indian Standard value is 50 mg/ litre. All the 17 blocks of Nadia district have arsenic contamination above this level. The maximum concentration in Karimpur I CD Block is 1,363 mg/litre.
