= Baruipara, Nadia =

Baruipara
- Village
- Location in West Bengal, India Baruipara (India)
- Coordinates: 23.983234°N 88.727484°E
- Country: India
- State: West Bengal
- District: Nadia

Population (2011)
  - Total: 9,942

Languages
  - Official: Bengali, English
- Time zone: UTC+5:30 (IST)
- PIN: 741158 (Shikarpur)
- Telephone/STD code: 03471
- Lok Sabha constituency: Murshidabad
- Vidhan Sabha constituency: Karimpur
- Website: nadia.gov.in

Baruipara is a village in the Karimpur I CD block in the Tehatta subdivision of the Nadia district in the state of West Bengal, India.

== Geography ==
Cities and towns in Tehatta subdivision of Nadia district
CT: census town, R: rural/ urban centre.
Owing to space constraints in the small map, the actual locations in a larger map may vary slightly

=== Location ===
Baruipara is located at 23.983234°N 88.727484°E.

=== Area overview ===
Nadia district is mostly alluvial plains lying to the east of Hooghly River, locally known as Bhagirathi. The alluvial plains are cut across by such distributaries as Jalangi, Churni and Ichhamati. With these rivers getting silted up, floods are a recurring feature. The Tehatta subdivision, presented in the map alongside, is topographically part of the Nadia Plain North. The Jalangi River forms the district/ subdivision border in the north-western part and then flows through the subdivision. The other important rivers are Mathabhanga and Bhairab. The eastern portion forms the boundary with Bangladesh. The subdivision is overwhelmingly rural. 97.15% of the population lives in the rural areas and 2.85% lives in the urban areas.

Note: The map alongside presents some of the notable locations in the subdivision. All places marked in the map are linked in the larger full screen map. All the four subdivisions are presented with maps on the same scale – the size of the maps vary as per the area of the subdivision.

== Demographics ==
According to the 2011 Census of India, Baruipara had a total population of 9,942, of which 5,124 (52%) were males and 4,818 (48%) were females. Population in the age range 0–6 years was 965. The total number of literate persons in Baruipara was 7,911 (81.24% of the population over 6 years).

== Civic administration ==
=== CD block HQ ===
The headquarters of Karimpur I CD block are located at Baruipara.
