= Nazirpur =

- Census Town
- Location in West Bengal, India
- Coordinates: 23.8684°N 88.5386°E
- Country: India
- State: West Bengal
- District: Nadia

Population (2011)
  - Total: 3,807

Languages
  - Official: Bengali, English
- Time zone: UTC+5:30 (IST)
- PIN: 741165
- Telephone code: 91 3471
- ISO 3166 code: IN-WB
- Sex ratio: 966 females/1000 males
- Lok Sabha constituency: Krishnanagar
- Vidhan Sabha constituency: Tehatta
- Website: www.nadia.gov.in

Nazirpur (Bengali: নাজিরপুর) is a Census Town in the Tehatta I CD block in the Tehatta subdivision of the Nadia district in the State of West Bengal, India. It is situated beside the Bangladesh India Border.

== Geography ==
Cities and towns in Tehatta subdivision of Nadia district
CT: census town, R: rural/ urban centre.
Owing to space constraints in the small map, the actual locations in a larger map may vary slightly

=== Location ===
Nazirpur is located at 23.8684°N 88.5386°E.

=== Area overview ===
Nadia district is mostly alluvial plains lying to the east of Hooghly River, locally known as Bhagirathi. The alluvial plains are cut across by such distributaries as Jalangi, Churni and Ichhamati. With these rivers getting silted up, floods are a recurring feature. The Tehatta subdivision, presented in the map alongside, is topographically part of the Nadia Plain North. The Jalangi River forms the district/ subdivision border in the north-western part and then flows through the subdivision. The other important rivers are Mathabhanga and Bhairab. The eastern portion forms the boundary with Bangladesh. The subdivision is overwhelmingly rural. 97.15% of the population lives in the rural areas and 2.85% lives in the urban areas.

Note: The map alongside presents some of the notable locations in the subdivision. All places marked in the map are linked in the larger full screen map. All the four subdivisions are presented with maps on the same scale – the size of the maps vary as per the area of the subdivision.

== Demography ==
According to the 2011 Census report Nazirpur has population of 3807 of which 1936 are males while 1871 are females. In Nazirpur, population of children with age 0-6 is 412 which is 10.82% of total population and the sex ratio of Nazirpur is 966 which is higher than West Bengal state average. Nazirpur is under low literacy rate compared to the state of West Bengal. In 2011, literacy rate of Nazirpur was 74.14%.

== Transport ==
State Highway 11 passes through Nazirpur. Frequent Bus services are available from Nazirpur to district headquarter Krishnanagar and other places like Karimpur, Berhampore, Kolkata, Santragachi, Bardhaman, plassey, Bangaon and Digha.

== Education ==
There are a Higher Secondary School named Nazirpur Vidyapith (H.S.), a Girls' High School named Nazirpur Sarada Balika Vidyalaya (H.S.) and few primary schools in the village. Nearest general degree college, Dr. B.R. Ambedkar College is situated at Betai. Nazirpur Teachers Training College, a B.Ed college was established in Kanaikhali village, near Nazirpur.

== Healthcare ==
Nazirpur Block Primary Health Centre, with 10 beds at Nazirpur, is the major government medical facility in the Tehatta I CD block.
