= Karimpur II =

- Community development block
- Coordinates: 23°55′9″N 88°39′3″E
- Country: India
- State: West Bengal
- District: Nadia

Government
  - Type: Community development block

Area
  - Total: 224.38 km^{2} (86.63 sq mi)
- Elevation: 19 m (62 ft)

Population (2011)
  - Total: 217,136
  - Density: 967.72/km^{2} (2,506.4/sq mi)

Languages
  - Official: Bengali, English

Literacy (2011)
  - Total literates: 119,778 (62.04%)
- Time zone: UTC+5:30 (IST)
- PIN: 741165 (Nazirpur)
- Telephone/STD code: 03471
- ISO 3166 code: IN-WB
- Vehicle registration: WB-51, WB-52
- Lok Sabha constituency: Murshidabad, Krishnanagar
- Vidhan Sabha constituency: Karimpur, Tehatta
- Website: nadia.nic.in

Karimpur II is a community development block that forms an administrative division in Tehatta subdivision of Nadia district in the Indian state of West Bengal.

== Geography ==
Karimpur II CD Block is bounded by Karimpur I CD Block, in the north, Daulatpur Upazila in Kushtia District and Gangni Upazila in Meherpur District of Bangladesh in the east, Tehatta I and Tehatta II CD Blocks in the south and Naoda CD Block, in Murshidabad district, in the west.

Nadia district is mostly alluvial plains lying to the east of Hooghly River, locally known as the Bhagirathi. The alluvial plains are cut across by such distributaries as Jalangi, Churni and Ichhamati. With these rivers getting silted up, floods are a recurring feature.

Karimpur II CD Block has an area of 224.38 km^{2}. It has 1 panchayat samity, 10 gram panchayats, 161 gram sansads (village councils), 71 mouzas and 65 inhabited villages. Murutia and Thanapara police stations serve this block. Headquarters of this CD Block is at Rahmatpur.

=== Gram Panchayats ===
Gram panchayats of Karimpur II block/ panchayat samiti are: Dhoradaha-I, Dhoradaha-II, Dighalkandi, Murutia, Nandanpur, Narayanpur I, Narayanpur II, Natidanga I, Natidanga II and Rahamatpur.

==== Villages ====
Tarakganj is an important village of Nandanpur Gram panchayet as well as in Karimpur Police station and Karimpur II Community Development Block. There is a high school and one library named Tarakganj Vidyasagar Gramin Granthagar in the village. Murutia, a constituent police station village in Karimpur II CD Block, is located at 23°55′9″N 88°39′3″E.

Kishorpur is also an important village where the historical Kuthi Bari is situated, which was constructed by former Member of Parliament (Krishnagar and Nabadwip), social worker Smt. Ila Pal Choudhury.

== Demographics ==
=== Population ===
As per the 2011 Census of India, Karimpur II CD Block had a total population of 217,136, all of which were rural. There were 111,418 (51%) males and 105,648 (49%) females. The population below 6 years was 24,063. Scheduled Castes numbered 35,130 (16.18%) and Scheduled Tribes numbered 2,643 (1.22%).

As per the 2001 census, Karimpur II block had a total population 191,922, out of which 99,091 were males and 92.831 were females. Karimpur II block registered a population growth of 17.62 per cent during the 1991-2001 decade. Decadal growth for the district was 19.51 per cent. Decadal growth in West Bengal was 17.84 per cent.

Large villages (with 4,000+ population) in Karimpur II CD Block were (2011 census figures in brackets): Dogachhi (20,845), Dhoradaha (8,750), Pipulkhola (5,953), Saguna (7,397), Natidanga (5,118), Char Moktappur (5,144), Fazil Nagar (10,844), Narayanpur (10,994), Sadipur (5,425), Topla (7,178), Thanapara (8,834), Kishorpur (4,035), Dakshin Gopalpur (8,880), Barbakpur (7,739), Goas (9,609), Rahmatpur (6,225), Mahish Bathan (9,831), Kathalia (6,911) and Murutia (4,270).

Other villages in Karimpur II CD Block include (2011 census figures in brackets): Dighalkandi (2,734) and Nandanpur

=== Literacy ===
As per the 2011 census, the total number of literates in Karimpur II CD Block was 119,778 (62.04% of the population over 6 years) out of which males numbered 62,838 (63.35% of the male population over 6 years) and females numbered 56,940 (60.65% of the female population over 6 years). The gender disparity (the difference between female and male literacy rates) was 2.71%.

See also – List of West Bengal districts ranked by literacy rate

Literacy in CD blocks of
Nadia district
Tehatta subdivision
Karimpur I – 67.70%
Karimpur II – 62.04%
Tehatta I – 70.72%
Tehatta II – 68.52%
Krishnanagar Sadar subdivision
Kaliganj – 65.89%
Nakashipara – 64.86%
Chapra – 68.25%
Krishnanagar I – 71.45%
Krishnanagar II – 68.52%
Nabadwip – 67.72%
Krishnaganj – 72.86%
Ranaghat subdivision
Hanskhali – 80.11%
Santipur – 73.10%
Ranaghat I – 77.61%
Ranaghat II – 79.38%
Kalyani subdivision
Chakdaha – 64.17%
Haringhata – 82.15%
Source: 2011 Census: CD Block Wise
Primary Census Abstract Data

=== Language and religion ===
Religion in Karimpur II CD block (2011)
Islam	60.00%
Hinduism	39.90%
Other or not stated	0.10%

In the 2011 census, Muslims numbered 131,116 and formed 60.38% of the population in Karimpur II CD Block. Hindus numbered 85,789 and formed 39.52% of the population. Christians numbered 135 and formed 0.06% of the population. Others numbered 96 and formed 0.04% of the population.

In the 2001 census, Hindus numbered 195,736 and formed 54.57% of the combined population of Karimpur I and Karimpur II CD Blocks. Muslims numbered 162,357 and formed 45.27% of the combined population. In the 1991 census, Hindus numbered 173,914 and formed 56.65% of the combined population of Karimpur I and Karimpur II CD Blocks. Muslims numbered 132,729 and formed 43.24% of the combined population.

Bengali is the predominant language, spoken by 99.49% of the population.

== Rural poverty ==
The District Human Development Report for Nadia has provided a CD Block-wise data table for Modified Human Vulnerability Index of the district. Karimpur II CD Block registered 38.87 on the MHPI scale. The CD Block-wise mean MHVI was estimated at 33.92. A total of 8 out of the 17 CD Blocks in Nadia district were found to be severely deprived when measured against the CD Block mean MHVI - Karimpur I and Karimpur II (under Tehatta subdivision), Kaliganj, Nakashipara, Chapra, Krishnanagar I and Nabadwip (under Krishnanagar Sadar subdivision) and Santipur (under Ranaghat subdivision) appear to be backward.

As per the Human Development Report 2004 for West Bengal, the rural poverty ratio in Nadia district was 28.35%. The estimate was based on Central Sample data of NSS 55th round 1999–2000.

== Economy ==
=== Livelihood ===
In Karimpur II CD Block in 2011, amongst the class of total workers, cultivators formed 23.78%, agricultural labourers 55.52%, household industry workers 4.14% and other workers 16.56%.

The southern part of Nadia district starting from Krishnanagar I down to Chakdaha and Haringhata has some urban pockets specialising in either manufacturing or service related economic activity and has reflected a comparatively higher concentration of population but the urban population has generally stagnated. Nadia district still has a large chunk of people living in the rural areas.

=== Infrastructure ===
There are 65 inhabited villages in Karimpur II CD Block. 100% villages have power supply and drinking water supply. 10 Villages (15.38%) have post offices. 64 villages (98.46%) have telephones (including landlines, public call offices and mobile phones). 27 villages (41.54%) have a pucca approach road and 38 villages (58.46%) have transport communication (includes bus service, rail facility and navigable waterways). 13 villages (20.00%) have agricultural credit societies and 7 villages (10.77%) have banks. However, although 100% villages in Nadia district had power supply in 2011, a survey in 2007-08 revealed that less than 50% of households had an electricity connection. In rural areas of the country, the tube well was for many years considered to be the provider of safe drinking water, but with arsenic contamination of ground water claiming public attention it is no longer so. Piped water supply is still a distant dream. In 2007–08, the availability of piped drinking water in Nadia district was as low as 8.6%, well below the state average of around 20%.

=== Agriculture ===
Persons engaged in agriculture
in Karimpur II CD Block
1. Bargadars (7.95%)
2. Patta holders (8.99%)
3. Small farmers (6.73%)
4. Marginal farmers (23.9%)
5. Agricultural labourers (52.5%)

Although the Bargadari Act of 1950 recognised the rights of bargadars to a higher share of crops from the land that they tilled, it was not implemented fully. Large tracts, beyond the prescribed limit of land ceiling, remained with the rich landlords. From 1977 onwards major land reforms took place in West Bengal. Land in excess of land ceiling was acquired and distributed amongst the peasants. Following land reforms land ownership pattern has undergone transformation. In 2013–14, persons engaged in agriculture in Karimpur II CD Block could be classified as follows: bargadars 7.95%, patta (document) holders 8.99%, small farmers (possessing land between 1 and 2 hectares) 6.73%, marginal farmers (possessing land up to 1 hectare) 23.86% and agricultural labourers 52.45%. As the proportion of agricultural labourers is very high, the real wage in the agricultural sector has been a matter of concern.

Karimpur II CD Block had 142 fertiliser depots and 59 fair price shops in 2013–14.

In 2013–14, Karimpur II CD Block produced 6,456 tonnes of Aman paddy, the main winter crop from 2,139 hectares, 5,512 tonnes of Boro paddy (spring crop) from 1,441 hectares, 532 tonnes of Aus paddy (summer crop) from 203 hectares, 20,669 tonnes of wheat from 6,324 hectares, 145,864 tonnes of jute from 10,323 hectares, 2,107 tonnes of potatoes from 70 hectares and 301 tonnes of sugar cane from 3 hectares. It also produced pulses and oilseeds.

In 2013–14, the total area irrigated in Karimpur II CD Block was 814 hectares, out of which 220 hectares were irrigated by river lift irrigation and 590 hectares by deep tube wells.

=== Banking ===
In 2013–14, Karimpur II CD Block had offices of 4 commercial banks and 5 gramin banks.

== Transport ==
Karimpur II CD Block has 8 ferry services and 7 originating/ terminating bus routes. The nearest railway station is 55 km from CD Block headquarters.

SH 11, running from Mahammad Bazar (in Birbhum district) to Ranaghat (in Nadia district) passes through this CD Block.

== Education ==
In 2013–14, Karimpur II CD Block had 113 primary schools with 9,887 students, 9 middle schools with 713 students, 4 high school with 3,206 students and 14 higher secondary schools with 21,859 students. Karimpur II CD Block had 1 technical/ professional institutions with 100 students and 370 institutions for special and non-formal education with 14,682 students

In Karimpur II CD Block, amongst the 65 inhabited villages, 6 had no school, 38 had more than 1 primary school, 28 had at least 1 primary school, 31 had at least 1 primary and 1 middle school and 18 had at least 1 middle and 1 secondary school.

== Healthcare ==
In 2014, Karimpur II CD Block had 1 block primary health centre, 1 primary health centre with total 40 beds and 5 doctors (excluding private bodies). It had 31 family welfare subcentres. 6,806 patients were treated indoor and 182,273 patients were treated outdoor in the hospitals, health centres and subcentres of the CD Block.

Natidanga Rural Hospital, with 30 beds at Natidanga, is the major government medical facility in the Karimpur II CD block. There is a primary health centres at Nandanpur (with 10 beds).

Karimpur II CD Block is one of the areas of Nadia district where ground water is affected by high level of arsenic contamination. The WHO guideline for arsenic in drinking water is 10 mg/ litre, and the Indian Standard value is 50 mg/ litre. All the 17 blocks of Nadia district have arsenic contamination above this level. The maximum concentration in Karimpur II CD Block is 1,180 mg/litre.
