= Mohammad Bazar, Birbhum =

Mohammad Bazar
- census town
- Location in West Bengal, India
- Coordinates: 23.993944°N 87.571944°E
- Country: India
- State: West Bengal
- District: Birbhum

Population (2011)
  - Total: 3,090

Languages
  - Official: Bengali, English
- Time zone: UTC+5:30 (IST)
- PIN: 731127 (Mohammad Bazar)
- Telephone/STD code: 03462
- Lok Sabha constituency: Birbhum
- Vidhan Sabha constituency: Sainthia
- Website: birbhum.nic.in

Mohammad Bazar is a census town in Mohammad Bazar CD Block in Suri Sadar subdivision of Birbhum district in the Indian state of West Bengal.

== Geography ==
Cities and towns in Suri Sadar subdivision of Birbhum district
M: municipal city/ town, CT: census town, R: rural/ urban centre, B: Barrage.
Owing to space constraints in the small map, the actual locations in a larger map may vary slightly

=== Police station ===
Mohammad Bazar police station has jurisdiction over Mohammad Bazar CD block.

== Demographics ==
As per the 2011 Census of India, Mahammadbazar had a total population of 3,090 of which 1,545 (50%) were males and 1,545 (50%) were females. Population below 6 years was 361. The total number of literates in Mahammadbazar was 2,000 (73.29% of the population over 6 years).

== Transport ==
NH 14, running from Morgram (in Murshidabad district) to Kharagpur (in Paschim Medinipur district) passes through Mohammad Bazar. This section was earlier part of Panagarh-Morgram Highway. SH 11, originates from Mohammad Bazar and runs to Ranaghat (in Nadia district).

== Post Office ==
Mohammad Bazar has a delivery sub post office, with PIN 731127, under Suri head office. Branch offices using the same PIN are situated at Amjolpahari, Biadyanathpur, Baliharpur, Bishnupurkulkuri, Charicha, Debagramchuramali, Kapista, Nimdaspur, Rampur, Sarenda, Sehelaraipur and Seherakuri.

== Culture ==
Udayan Pathagar, a government-sponsored library at Mohammad Bazar, was established in 1973. It has its own pucca building.

== Healthcare ==
Mohammad Bazar Rural Hospital at PO Pattelnagar has 30 beds.
