= Nalinaksha Sanyal =

Indian politician, economist and freedom fighter

Member of West Bengal Legislative Assembly
- In office 1967–1971
- Constituency: Karimpur

Personal details
- Born: November 1898
- Died: 29 October 1987 (aged 88)
- Party: Indian National Congress; Bangla Congress
- Education: University of London (Ph.D.); London School of Economics; Presidency University; Murshidabad University
- Source: [Samsad Bangali Charitabhidhan]

Nalinaksha Sanyal (1898 – 29 October 1987) was an Indian politician, economist and freedom fighter.

== Education ==
He studied at Krishnath College (now Murshidabad University), Baharampur and Presidency College, Kolkata and taught economics at Krishnath College. He earned a master's degree from the London School of Economics and secured a PhD in economics from University of London after carrying out research under W.T.Stephenson. 1929 PhD thesis University of London "Development of Indian Railways, 1842-1928" N SANYAL supervised by Prof Foxwell; Dr Slater

== Political career ==
While in London, Sanyal served on several committees for the London branch of the Indian National Congress, a banned organization. He was arrested twice for his participation. Sanyal returned to India to become a professor at Calcutta University, but the government disallowed his appointment because of his activism. Sanyal took a position with insurance companies New India Assurance Co., the Metropolitan Assurance Co., and the Hindustan Co-operative Society Ltd.

Sanyal continued to actively protest against British colonial rule and was imprisoned seven times. He was elected to the Bengal Assembly and served as Chief Whip of the Indian National Congress of undivided Bengal, prior to the partition of the province. He was a vocal critic of the colonial government's policies during the Bengal Famine in 1943. In 1946, Sanyal was at the forefront of efforts to avoid the Partition of India. His suggestion of a loose federation was widely circulated and debated but was ultimately not adopted. When India was partitioned in 1947, he and Atulya Ghosh were able to convince the British to leave Maldah district in India (the area had a population that was evenly divided between Hindus and Muslims).

After the independence, Sanyal remained an active force in building the new India and held many senior positions in government as well as represented India in international bodies. In 1968 he established Karimpur Pannadevi College at Karimpur, Nadia district.

== Social activities ==
Sanyal was a modern personality and free thinker in his time. He married in 1924 with daughter of Sharat Chandra Bhattacharya of Baharampur with simplified Hindu rituals. He was strongly against dowry, castism, religious formalities. Even being a Brahmin he invited his Muslim friend Kazi Nazrul Islam to his marriage ceremony ignoring the social restrictions of that time. He established Dhoradaha RajaniKanta High School in 1961 at Dhoradaha in his father's name. After that in 1968 he established Karimpur Pannadevi College at Karimpur.

The economist and writer Sanjeev Sanyal is his great-grandson maternally.
