= Tehatta I =

- Community development block
- Nickname: Sultan
- Coordinates: 23.7225°N 88.5275°E
- Country: India
- State: West Bengal
- District: Nadia

Government
  - Type: Community development block

Area
  - Total: 249.55 km^{2} (96.35 sq mi)
- Elevation: 13 m (43 ft)

Population (2011)
  - Total: 244,322
  - Density: 979.05/km^{2} (2,535.7/sq mi)

Languages
  - Official: Bengali, English

Literacy (2011)
  - Total literates: 155,228 (70.07%)
- Time zone: UTC+5:30 (IST)
- PIN: 741160 (Tehatta); 741163 (Betai); 741169 (Chanderghat)
- Telephone/STD code: 03474
- Vehicle registration: WB-51, WB-52
- Lok Sabha constituency: Krishnanagar
- Vidhan Sabha constituency: Tehatta, Palashipara
- Website: nadia.nic.in

Tehatta I is a community development block that forms an administrative division in Tehatta subdivision of Nadia district in the Indian state of West Bengal.

== Geography ==
Tehatta is located at 23°43′21″N 88°31′39″E. at Tehatta

Tehatta I CD Block is bounded by Naoda, in Murshidabad district, and Karimpur II CD Block, in the north, Gangni Upazila, Meherpur Sadar Upazila and Mujibnagar Upazila of Meherpur District of Bangladesh in the east, Chapra CD Block in the south and Tehatta II CD Block in the west.

Nadia district is mostly alluvial plains lying to the east of Hooghly River, locally known as the Bhagirathi. The alluvial plains are cut across by such distributaries as the Jalangi, Churni and Ichhamati. With these rivers getting silted up, floods are a recurring feature.

Tehatta I CD Block has an area of 249.55 km^{2}. It has 1 panchayat samity, 11 gram panchayats, 185 gram sansads (village councils), 62 mouzas and 55 inhabited villages. Tehatta police station serves this block. Headquarters of this CD Block is at Tehatta.

Gram panchayats of Tehatta I block/ panchayat samiti are: Betai I, Betai II, Chanderghat, Chitka, Kanainagar, Natna, Patharghata I, Patharghata II, Raghunathpur, Shyamnagar and Tehatta.

== Demographics ==
=== Population ===
As per the 2011 Census of India, Tehatta I CD Block had a total population of 244,322, all of which were rural. There were 125,875 (52%) males and 118,447 (48%) females. The population 6 years was 24,827. Scheduled Castes numbered 85,294 (34.91%) and Scheduled Tribes numbered 4,481 (1.83%).

As per the 2001 census, Tehatta I block had a total population 217,541, out of which 111,673 were males and 105,868 were females. Tehatta I block registered a population growth of 16.87 per cent during the 1991-2001 decade. Decadal growth for the district was 19.51 per cent. Decadal growth in West Bengal was 17.84 per cent.

Large villages (with 4,000+ population) in Tehatta I CD Block were (2011 census figures in brackets): Dhopahat (4,711), Chanderghat (8,399), Khaspu (4,210), Shyamnagar (7,470), Nischintapur (5,065), Chilakhali (4,759), Fatepur (4,131), Kanainagar (4,158), Rajapur (4,315), Chhitka (4,455), Mrigi (6,030), Kamalesh(6,030A), Binodnagar (6,059), Haripur (4,564), Mobarakpur (6,977), Betai (20,774), Karaigachhi (4,226), Betai Jitpur (14,193), Bagakhali (5,393), Jitpur (4,779), Tehatta (21,093), Natna (4,634), Taranipur (7,162), Puthimari (9,157) and Pathar Ghata (16,219).

Other villages in Tehatta I CD Block include (2011 census figures in brackets): Raghunathpur (1,767).

=== Literacy ===
As per the 2011 census, the total number of literates in Tehatta I CD Block was 155,228 (70.72% of the population over 6 years) out of which males numbered 83,454 (73.68% of the male population over 6 years) and females numbered 71,774 (67.54% of the female population over 6 years). The gender disparity (the difference between female and male literacy rates) was 6.14%.

See also – List of West Bengal districts ranked by literacy rate

Literacy in CD blocks of
Nadia district
Tehatta subdivision
Karimpur I – 67.70%
Karimpur II – 62.04%
Tehatta I – 70.72%
Tehatta II – 68.52%
Krishnanagar Sadar subdivision
Kaliganj – 65.89%
Nakashipara – 64.86%
Chapra – 68.25%
Krishnanagar I – 71.45%
Krishnanagar II – 68.52%
Nabadwip – 67.72%
Krishnaganj – 72.86%
Ranaghat subdivision
Hanskhali – 80.11%
Santipur – 73.10%
Ranaghat I – 77.61%
Ranaghat II – 79.38%
Kalyani subdivision
Chakdaha – 64.17%
Haringhata – 82.15%
Source: 2011 Census: CD Block Wise
Primary Census Abstract Data

=== Language and religion ===
Religion in Tehatta I CD block (2011)
Hinduism	68.95%
Islam	29.21%
Christianity	1.78%
Other or not stated	0.06%

In the 2011 census Hindus numbered 168,455 and formed 68.95% of the population in Tehatta I CD Block. Muslims numbered 71,371 and formed 29.21% of the population. Christians numbered 4,356 and formed 1.78% of the population. Others numbered 140 and formed 0.06% of the population.

In the 2001 census Hindus numbered 220,357 and formed 62.67% of the combined population of Tehatta I and Tehatta II CD Blocks. Muslims numbered 127,045 and formed 36.13% of the combined population. In the 1991 census Hindus numbered 184,404 and formed 61.30% of the combined population of Tehatta I and Tehatta II CD Blocks. Muslims numbered 112,758 and formed 37.49% of the combined population.

Bengali is the predominant language, spoken by 99.31% of the population.

== Rural poverty ==
The District Human Development Report for Nadia has provided a CD Block-wise data table for Modified Human Vulnerability Index of the district. Tehatta I CD Block registered 32.71 on the MHPI scale. The CD Block-wise mean MHVI was estimated at 33.92. A total of 8 out of the 17 CD Blocks in Nadia district were found to be severely deprived when measured against the CD Block mean MHVI - Karimpur I and Karimpur II (under Tehatta subdivision), Kaliganj, Nakashipara, Chapra, Krishnanagar I and Nabadwip (under Krishnanagar Sadar subdivision) and Santipur (under Ranaghat subdivision) appear to be backward.

As per the Human Development Report 2004 for West Bengal, the rural poverty ratio in Nadia district was 28.35%. The estimate was based on Central Sample data of NSS 55th round 1999–2000.

== Economy ==
=== Livelihood ===
In Tehatta I CD Block in 2011, amongst the class of total workers, cultivators formed 26.84%, agricultural labourers 42.67%, household industry workers 5.06% and other workers 25.43%.

The southern part of Nadia district starting from Krishnanagar I down to Chakdaha and Haringhata has some urban pockets specialising in either manufacturing or service related economic activity and has reflected a comparatively higher concentration of population but the urban population has generally stagnated. Nadia district still has a large chunk of people living in the rural areas.

=== Infrastructure ===
There are 55 inhabited villages in Tehatta I CD Block. 100% villages have power supply and drinking water supply. 16 Villages (29.09%) have post offices. 55 villages (100%) have telephones (including landlines, public call offices and mobile phones). 44 villages (80.00%) have a pucca approach road and 40 villages (74.73%) have transport communication (includes bus service, rail facility and navigable waterways). 15 villages (27.27%) have agricultural credit societies and 9 villages (16.36%) have banks. It should, however, be noted that although 100% villages in Nadia district had power supply in 2011, a survey in 2007-08 revealed that less than 50% of households had electricity connection. In rural areas of the country, the tube well was for many years considered to be the provider of safe drinking water, but with arsenic contamination of ground water claiming public attention it is no longer so. Piped water supply is still a distant dream. In 2007–08, the availability of piped drinking water in Nadia district was as low as 8.6%, well below the state average of around 20%.

=== Agriculture ===
Persons engaged in agriculture
in Tehatta I CD Block
1. Bargadars (6.41%)
2. Patta holders (14.4%)
3. Small farmers (7.24%)
4. Marginal farmers (28.3%)
5. Agricultural labourers (43.6%)

Although the Bargadari Act of 1950 recognised the rights of bargadars to a higher share of crops from the land that they tilled, it was not implemented fully. Large tracts, beyond the prescribed limit of land ceiling, remained with the rich landlords. From 1977 onwards major land reforms took place in West Bengal. Land in excess of land ceiling was acquired and distributed amongst the peasants. Following land reforms land ownership pattern has undergone transformation. In 2013–14, persons engaged in agriculture in Tehatta I CD Block could be classified as follows: bargadars 6.41%, patta (document) holders 14.42%, small farmers (possessing land between 1 and 2 hectares) 7.24%, marginal farmers (possessing land up to 1 hectare) 28.30% and agricultural labourers 43.63%. As the proportion of agricultural labourers is very high, the real wage in the agricultural sector has been a matter of concern.

Tehatta I CD Block had 312 fertiliser depots and 76 fair price shops in 2013–14.

In 2013–14, Tehatta I CD Block produced 2,053 tonnes of Aman paddy, the main winter crop from 875 hectares, 13,221 tonnes of Boro paddy (spring crop) from 3,769 hectares, 3,239 tonnes of Aus paddy (summer crop) from 1,378 hectares, 20,965 tonnes of wheat from 6,231 hectares, 166,280 tonnes of jute from 10,868 hectares and 2,423 tonnes of potatoes from 85 hectares. It also produced pulses and oilseeds.

In 2013–14, the total area irrigated in Tehatta I CD Block was 2,233 hectares, out of which 1,211 hectares were irrigated by river lift irrigation and 1,022 hectares by deep tube wells.

=== Banking ===
In 2013–14, Tehatta I CD Block had offices of 7 commercial banks and 3 gramin banks.

== Transport ==
Tehatta I CD Block has 5 ferry services and 3 originating/ terminating bus routes. The nearest railway station is 31 km from CD Block headquarters.

SH 11, running from Mahammad Bazar (in Birbhum district) to Ranaghat (in Nadia district) passes through this CD Block.

== Education ==
In 2013–14, Tehatta I CD Block had 132 primary schools with 10,094 students, 7 middle schools with 1,447 students, 3 high school with 2,039 students and 18 higher secondary schools with 28,524 students. Tehatta I CD Block had 1 general college with 5,302 students and 398 institutions for special and non-formal education with 13,349 students

In Tehatta I CD Block, amongst the 55 inhabited villages, 2 had no school, 34 had more than 1 primary school, 22 had at least 1 primary school, 31 had at least 1 primary and 1 middle school and 18 had at least 1 middle and 1 secondary school.

Dr. B.R. Ambedkar College was established at Betai in 1973. A local educationist Haran Chandra Biswas played a major role in establishing the college. It is affiliated to the University of Kalyani. It offers degree courses in arts and commerce.

Tehatta Government College was established at Tehatta in 2014. It is affiliated to the University of Kalyani and offers honours courses in five subjects.

== Healthcare ==
In 2014, Tehatta I CD Block had 1 hospital, 2 primary health centres and 1 private nursing home with total 225 beds and 15 doctors (excluding private bodies). It had 27 family welfare subcentres. 13,456 patients were treated indoor and 227,956 patients were treated outdoor in the hospitals, health centres and subcentres of the CD Block.

Nazirpur Block Primary Health Centre, with 10 beds at Nazirpur, is the major government medical facility in the Tehatta I CD block. There are primary health centres at Kusthia (with 6 beds) and Shyamnagar (with 10 beds).

Tehatta I CD Block is one of the areas of Nadia district where ground water is affected by high level of arsenic contamination. The WHO guideline for arsenic in drinking water is 10 mg/ litre, and the Indian Standard value is 50 mg/ litre. All the 17 blocks of Nadia district have arsenic contamination above this level. The maximum concentration in Tehatta I CD Block is 3,200 mg/litre.

== Notable people ==
- Biswas family of Lalbazar
  - Sahiuddin Bishwas (1923–1990), politician
  - Farhad Hossain Dodul (born 1972), politician
