= Tehatta =

- city
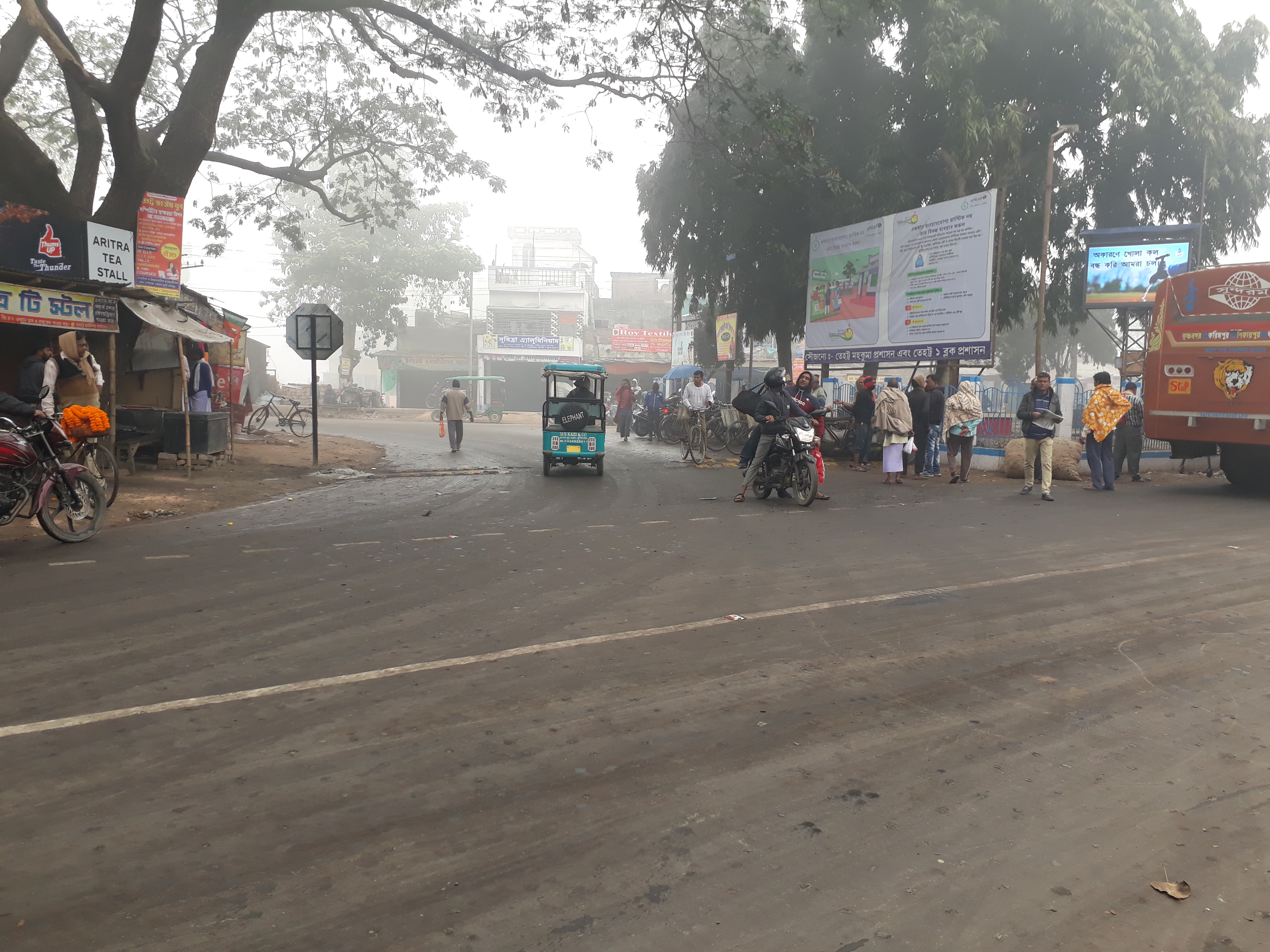
- Tehatta state highway more

- Location in West Bengal, India
- Coordinates: 23.7°N 88.55°E
- Country: India
- State: West Bengal
- District: Nadia

Population (2011)
  - Total: 21,093

Languages
  - Official: Bengali, English
- Time zone: UTC+5:30 (IST)
- PIN: 741160
- Telephone code: 91 3471
- ISO 3166 code: IN-WB
- Sex ratio: 965 females/1000 males
- Lok Sabha constituency: Krishnanagar
- Vidhan Sabha constituency: Tehatta, Palshipara

Tehatta city is the headquarters and self governing area of the Tehatta subdivision in Nadia district in the Indian state of West Bengal. The place is a sub-divisions in the district of Nadia. It was declared as sub-division in 1996. Tehatta is located beside the India-Bangladesh border area.

== Geography ==
Cities and towns in Tehatta subdivision of Nadia district
CT: census town, R: rural/ urban centre.
Owing to space constraints in the small map, the actual locations in a larger map may vary slightly

=== Location ===
Tehatta is located at 23.7°N 88.55°E.

=== Area overview ===
Nadia district is mostly alluvial plains lying to the east of Hooghly River, locally known as Bhagirathi. The alluvial plains are cut across by such distributaries as Jalangi, Churni and Ichhamati. With these rivers getting silted up, floods are a recurring feature. The Tehatta subdivision, presented in the map alongside, is topographically part of the Nadia Plain North. The Jalangi River forms the district/ subdivision border in the north-western part and then flows through the subdivision. The other important rivers are Mathabhanga and Bhairab. The eastern portion forms the boundary with Bangladesh. The central part of Tehatta is around 7.8 km away from the Bangladesh Border.The subdivision is overwhelmingly rural. 97.15% of the population lives in the rural areas and 2.85% lives in the urban areas.

Note: The map alongside presents some of the notable locations in the subdivision. All places marked in the map are linked in the larger full screen map. All the four subdivisions are presented with maps on the same scale – the size of the maps vary as per the area of the subdivision.

== Demographics ==
According to the 2011 Census of India, Tehatta had a total population of 28,800(approx), of which 10,736 (51%) were males and 10,357 (49%) were females. Population in the age range 0–6 years was 2,021. The total number of literate persons in Tehatta was 14,505 (76.05% of the population over 6 years).

In 2010, the town was declared to be a municipality.

== Civic administration ==
=== Police station ===
Tehatta police station has jurisdiction over a portion of Tehatta I and Tehatta II CD blocks. The total area covered by the police station is 519 km^{2} and the population covered is 351,654 (2001 census). 45 km of the India-Bangladesh border is within the PS area – 40 km across river borders.

=== CD block HQ ===
The headquarters of Tehatta I CD block are located at Tehatta.

=== Administration ===
Tehatta is an intermediate panchayat (local self-government) under Nadia Zilla Parishad. Village panchayats under it are – Betai I & II, Chanderghat, Chhitka, Kanainagar, Natna, Patharghata I & II, Raghunathpur, Shyamnagar, Tehatta, Barnia, Gopinathpur, Hanspukuria, Natipota, Palashipara I & II, Boyarbandha, Khaspur, Kulgachhi, Palsunda I & II, and Sahebnagar.

== Transportation ==
Roads and highways

Tehatta is around 42 km north from the district town Krishnanagar and 140 km north from the state capital Kolkata. Tehatta is well connected with Krishnanagar and Karimpur via the Krishnanagar- Karimpur bus route (State highway 11) and connected with NH 34 via the Tehatta- Palashipara - Palashi /Tehatta Ghat-Barnia- Debagram route and 3 km from Natipota.

Railway systems

The nearest railway station for connecting to Kolkata/Baharampur is Debagram railway station. But Krishnagar City Jn. Railway Station is the major railway station situated near about 50 km from Tehatta.

In the 2009-2010 Indian rail budget, a new railway route was declared from Krishnanagar, Nadia to Berhampur, Murshidabad via Tehatta. Also, a new railway route between Tehatta Ghat to Katwa Ghat is under survey of Indian railway department.

== Education ==
=== Schools ===
1. Tehatta High School (H.S) under the WBBSE & WBCHSE.
2. Tehatta Shridam Chandra Balika Vidyalaya (for girls) (HS)
3. Jitpur Uchha Vidyalaya - (10th)
4. Natna Uchha Vidyalaya - (12th)

Other Nearby High Schools:

1. Siddheswaritala Institution- The oldest high school of this area, established in 1921.
2. Palashipara Mahatma Gandhi Smriti Vidyapith (H.S)
3. Bhowanipur High School
4. Chanderghat High school (H.S.)
5. Debnathpur Sarat Sarkar High School
6. Nimtala Vidhya Niketan(HS)
7. Palashipara Mahatma Gandhi Smriti Balika Vidyapith
8. Sahebnagar High School
9. Hanspukuria Vidyapith (H.S.)

=== Colleges ===
Tehatta Government College was established in 2014 under the University of Kalyani. The College started its operations from the 2015–16 session with the faculty strength reaching 12 by the end of the session. Currently 5 arts subjects and 3 science subjects are taught there. Nearby another college is Dr. B.R. Ambedkar College situated at Betai, about 10 km from central of Tehatta. Another B.Ed college named Tehatta Institute of Education is located at Arshiganj village, about 5 km from Tehatta. Another College has been set up by the West Bengal Government in Tehatta named as Tehatta Government ITI.

== Culture ==
Although almost all Hindu festivals are observed here, Bhattacharya family's Durga Puja is oldest among it. Jagaddhatri Puja is celebrated with much pomp and grandeur during the waxing phase of the moon in the Bengali month of Kartik. There are about 50 puja committees and about six big budget pujas. Architects work for two months to make their pandals.

Krishna Rai Jeu Temple of Tehatta Thakurpara is the oldest temple in Tehatta area and many festivals happen throughout the year around Lord Krishna.

== Healthcare ==
A sub-divisional hospital is located at the centre of the town along with some private medical facilities and a couple of nursing homes. Krishnanagar Sadar Hospital is about 42 km away.
