= Tehatta subdivision =

- Subdivision
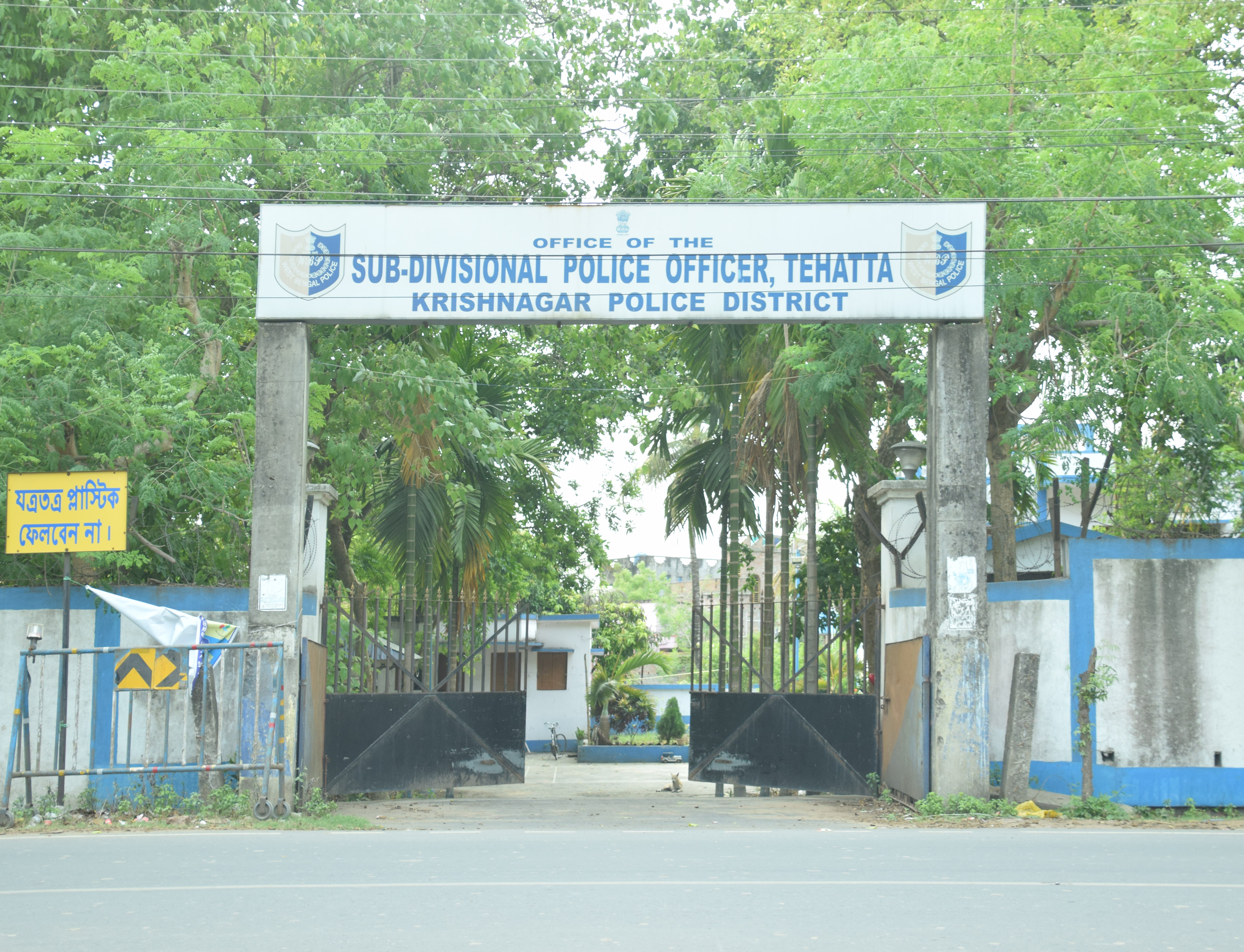

- Coordinates: 23.70°N 88.55°E
- Country: India
- State: West Bengal
- District: Nadia
- Headquarters: Tehatta

Languages
  - Official: Bengali, English
- Time zone: UTC+5:30 (IST)
- ISO 3166 code: IN-WB
- Vehicle registration: WB
- Website: nadia.nic.in

Tehatta subdivision is an administrative subdivision of the Nadia district in the state of West Bengal, India.

== Overview ==
Nadia district is part of the large alluvial plain formed by the Ganges-Bhagirathi system. The plains spread southwards from the head of the delta. The Tehatta subdivision is topographically part of the Nadia Plain North. The Jalangi River forms the district/ subdivision border in the north-western part and then flows through the subdivision. The other important rivers are Mathabhanga and Bhairab. This subdivision was part of Meherpur subdivision that slopes in a south-easterly direction and on the east has a long boundary with Bangladesh. The area had large forests. The huge influx of East Bengali refugees that took place in the district immediately after the partition of India and the steady influx ever since paved way for conversion of forest into agricultural land.

== Subdivisions ==
Nadia district is divided into the following administrative subdivisions:

Subdivision	Headquarters	Area km^{2}	Population (2011)	Rural population % (2011)	Urban population % (2011)
Tehatta subdivision	Tehatta	862.18	796,245	97.15	2.85
Krishnanagar Sadar	Krishnanagar	1,661.10	2,186,503	79.205	20.795
Ranaghat	Ranaghat	893.58	1,432,761	58.32	41.68
Kalyani	Kalyani	526.57	891,563	23.27	76.73
Nadia district	Krishnanagar	3,927.00	5,307,072	66.86	33.14

Cities and towns in Tehatta subdivision of Nadia district
CT: census town, R: rural/ urban centre.
Owing to space constraints in the small map, the actual locations in a larger map may vary slightly

== Administrative units ==
Tehatta subdivision has 5 police stations, 4 community development blocks, 4 panchayat samitis, 36 gram panchayats, 240 mouzas, 217 inhabited villages and 2 census towns. The census towns are: Karimpur and Uttampur.

The subdivision has its headquarters at Tehatta.

== Police stations ==
Police stations in Tehatta subdivision have the following features and jurisdiction:

Police station	Area covered km^{2}	India-Bangladesh border km	Municipal town	CD Block
Karimpur	116.796	4	-	Karimpur I
Hogalbaria	122.5	14	-	Karimpur I
Murutia	85.05	32	-	Karimpur II
Thanapara	97.0835	-	-	Karimpur II
Tehatta	519	45	-	Tehatta I
Palashipara			-	Tehatta II

== Blocks ==
Community development blocks in Tehatta subdivision are:

CD Block	Headquarters	Area km^{2}	Population (2011)	SC %	ST %	Hindus %	Muslims %	Literacy rate %	Census Towns
Karimpur I	Baruipara	215.78	183,556	17.46	3.20	67.77	31.95	67.70	2
Karimpur II	Rahmatpur	224.38	217,136	16.18	1.22	39.52	60.38	62.04	
Tehatta I	Tehatta	249.55	244,322	34.91	1.83	68.95	29.21	70.72	
Tehatta II	Palashipara	172.47	151,231	16.59	1.38	50.00	49.89	68.52	

== Gram Panchayats ==
The subdivision contains 36 gram panchayats under 4 community development blocks:

Karimpur I block consists of eight gram panchayats, viz. Harekrishnapur, Jamsherpur, Karimpur–II, Pipulbaria, Hogolbaria, Karimpur–I, Madhugari and Shikarpur.

Karimpur II block consists of ten gram panchayats, viz. Dhoradaha–I, Murutia, Narayanpur–II, Rahamatpur, Dhoradaha–II, Nandanpur, Natidanga–I, Dighal Kandi, Narayanpur–I and Natidanga&nda

Tehatta I block consists of 11 gram panchayats, viz. Betai–I, Chhitka, Patharghata–I, Shyamnagar, Betai–II, Kanainagar, Patharghata–II, Tehatta, Chanderghat, Natna and Raghunathpur.

Tehatta II block consists of seven gram panchayats, viz. Barnia, Hanspukuria, Palsunda–I, Sahebnagar, Gopinathpur, Palasipara and Palsunda–II.

== Education ==
Nadia district had a literacy rate of 74.97% as per the provisional figures of the census of India 2011. Tehatta subdivision had a literacy rate of 67.25%, Krishnanagar Sadar subdivision 71.03%, Ranaghat subdivision 79.51% and Kalyani subdivision 83.35.

Given in the table below (data in numbers) is a comprehensive picture of the education scenario in Nadia district for the year 2013-14:

Subdivision	Primary School		Middle School		High School		Higher Secondary School		General College, Univ		Technical / Professional Instt		Non-formal Education	
Subdivision	Institution	Student	Institution	Student	Institution	Student	Institution	Student	Institution	Student	Institution	Student	Institution	Student
Tehatta	424	35,755	27	3,746	12	9,223	53	85,338	2	9,556	7	705	1,321	49,314
Krishnanagar Sadar	1,066	106,019	82	14,710	39	22,754	160	222,437	9	26,970	24	3,265	2,836	106,868
Ranaghat	707	57,335	45	4,494	39	20,958	106	147,018	4	22,678	4	326	2,000	58,835
Kalyani	428	32,856	28	2,594	15	7,160	86	95,192	4	15477	27	12,522	1,160	22,331
Nadia district	2,625	231,965	182	25,544	105	60,695	405	549,985	19	74,771	62	16,548	7,317	237,348

Note: Primary schools include junior basic schools; middle schools, high schools and higher secondary schools include madrasahs; technical schools include junior technical schools, junior government polytechnics, industrial technical institutes, industrial training centres, nursing training institutes etc.; technical and professional colleges include engineering colleges, medical colleges, para-medical institutes, management colleges, teachers training and nursing training colleges, law colleges, art colleges, music colleges etc. Special and non-formal education centres include sishu siksha kendras, madhyamik siksha kendras, centres of Rabindra mukta vidyalaya, recognised Sanskrit tols, institutions for the blind and other handicapped persons, Anganwadi centres, reformatory schools etc.

The following institutions are located in Tehatta subdivision:

- Karimpur Pannadevi College was established at Karimpur in 1968. The establishment of the college was possible with the zeal of Dr. Nalinaksha Sanyal, a scholar and politician, and the generous contribution of Durga Prasad Agrawal, a local businessman. It is affiliated to the University of Kalyani. It offers honours courses in English, Bengali, history, political science, philosophy, geography, physics, chemistry, mathematics and accountancy. Some of the courses are self-financing.
- Dr. B.R. Ambedkar College was established at Betai in 1973. A local educationist Haran Chandra Biswas played a major role in establishing the college. It is affiliated to the University of Kalyani. It offers degree courses in arts and commerce.
- Tehatta Government College was established at Tehatta in 2014. It is affiliated to the University of Kalyani and offers honours courses in five subjects.

== Healthcare ==
The table below (all data in numbers) presents an overview of the medical facilities available and patients treated in the hospitals, health centres and sub-centres in 2014 in Nadia district.

Subdivision	Health & Family Welfare Deptt, WB				Other State Govt Deptts	Local bodies	Central Govt Deptts / PSUs	NGO / Private Nursing Homes	Total	Total Number of Beds	Total Number of Doctors*	Indoor Patients	Outdoor Patients
Subdivision	Hospitals	Rural Hospitals	Block Primary Health Centres	Primary Health Centres	Other State Govt Deptts	Local bodies	Central Govt Deptts / PSUs	NGO / Private Nursing Homes	Total	Total Number of Beds	Total Number of Doctors*	Indoor Patients	Outdoor Patients
Tehatta	1	1	2	7	-	-	-	6	17	405	36	36,811	1,035,750
Krishnanagar Sadar	3	4	3	20	2	16	1	31	80	2,386	113	165,867	2,304,887
Ranaghat	2	1	2	15	1	8	-	21	50	780	104	58,507	1,426,852
Kalyani	4	1	-	7	1	5	-	25	43	1,863	226	90,327	1,272,701
Nadia district	10	7	7	49	4	29	1	83	190	5,434	479	351,512	6,040,190

.* Excluding nursing homes

=== Medical facilities ===
Medical facilities in Tehatta subdivision are as follows:

Hospital in Tehatta subdivision: (Name, location, beds)

Tehatta Subdivisional Hospital at Tehatta with 68 beds.

Rural Hospitals and BPHC: (Name, block, location, beds)
Karimpur Rural Hospital, Karimpur I CD Block, Karimpur, 50 beds
Nathidanga Rural Hospital, Karimpur II CD Block, Natidanga, 30 beds
Palashipara (Pritimoyee) Rural Hospital, Tehatta II CD Block, Palashipara, 30 beds

Block Primary Health Centres: (Name, CD block, location, beds)

Nazirpur Block Primary Health Centre, Tehatta I CD Block, Nazirpur, 10 beds

Primary Health Centres (CD Block-wise)(CD Block, PHC location, beds)
Karimpur I CD Block: Sikarpur (10 beds), Bagchi Jamsherpur (10 beds)
Karimpur II CD Block: Nandanpur (10 beds)
Tehatta I CD Block: Kusthia (6 beds), Shyamnagar (10 beds)
Tehatta II CD Block: Barnia (10 beds), Chhota Nalda (6 beds)

== Electoral constituencies ==
Lok Sabha (parliamentary) and Vidhan Sabha (state assembly) constituencies in Tehatta subdivision were as follows:

Lok Sabha constituency	Reservation	Vidhan Sabha constituency	Reservation	CD Block and/or Gram panchayats and/or municipal areas
Murshidabad	None	Karimpur	None	Karimpur I community development block and Dhoradaha I, Dhoradaha II, Murutia, Natidanga I, Natidanga II and Rahamatpur gram panchayats of Karimpur II community development block
		All other Vidhan Sabha segments in Murshidabad district		
Krishnanagar	None	Tehatta	None	Betai I, Betai II, Chhitka, Kanainagar, Natna, Patharghata I, Raghunathpur, Shyamnagar and Tehatta GPs of Tehatta I CD Block and Dighal, Kandi, Nandanpur, Narayanpur I and Narayanpur II GPs of Karimpur II CD Block
		Palashipara	None	Chanderghat and PatharghataII gram panchayats of Tehatta I CD Block, Tehatta II CD Block, and Bikrampur, Bilkumari, Dhananjaypur and Haranagar GPs of Nakashipara CD Block
		All other Vidhan Sabha segments outside Tehatta subdivision		
