= Karimpur =

- Census Town
- Karimpur bus stand

- Location in West Bengal, India Karimpur (India)
- Coordinates: 23.97°N 88.62°E
- Country: India
- State: West Bengal
- District: Nadia

Area
  - Total: 1.62 km^{2} (0.63 sq mi)
- Elevation: 15 m (49 ft)

Population (2011)
  - Total: 9,661
  - Density: 5,960/km^{2} (15,400/sq mi)

Languages
  - Official: Bengali, English
- Time zone: UTC+5:30 (IST)
- PIN: 741152
- Vehicle registration: WB
- Lok Sabha constituency: Murshidabad
- Vidhan Sabha constituency: Karimpur, Tehatta
- Website: nadia.gov.in

Karimpur is a census town, near the bank of river Jalangi, in Karimpur I CD block in the Tehatta subdivision of the Nadia district in the Indian state of West Bengal.

== Geography ==
Cities and towns in Tehatta subdivision of Nadia district
CT: census town, R: rural/ urban centre.
Owing to space constraints in the small map, the actual locations in a larger map may vary slightly

=== Location ===
Karimpur is located at 23.97°N 88.62°E. It has an average elevation of 15 metres (49 ft). It is 183 km (114 mi) from Kolkata and is located at the bank of the River Jalangi.

=== Area overview ===
Nadia district is made up of mostly alluvial plains lying to the east of Hooghly River, locally known as Bhagirathi. The alluvial plains are cut across by such distributaries as the Jalangi, Churni and Ichhamati. With these rivers getting silted up, floods are a recurring feature. The Tehatta subdivision, presented in the map alongside, is topographically part of the Nadia Plain North. The Jalangi River forms the district/subdivision border in the north-western part and then flows through the subdivision. The other important rivers are Mathabhanga and Bhairab. The eastern portion forms the boundary with Bangladesh. The subdivision is overwhelmingly rural. 97.15% of the population lives in the rural areas and 2.85% lives in the urban areas.

Note: The map alongside presents some of the notable locations in the subdivision. All places marked in the map are linked in the larger full screen map. All the four subdivisions are presented with maps on the same scale – the size of the maps vary as per the area of the subdivision.

== Demographics ==
According to the 2011 Census of India, Karimpur had a total population of 9,661, of which 4,930 (51%) were males and 4,731 (49%) were females. Population in the age range 0–6 years was 775. The total number of literate persons in Karimpur was 7,616 (85.71% of the population over 6 years).

== Civic administration ==
=== Police station ===
Karimpur police station has jurisdiction over a portion of Karimpur I CD block. The total area covered by the police station is 116.796 km^{2} (45.095 sq mi) and the population covered is 117,879 (2001 census). Four kilometres (2.5 mi) of the Bangladesh-India border is within the PS area.

== Education ==
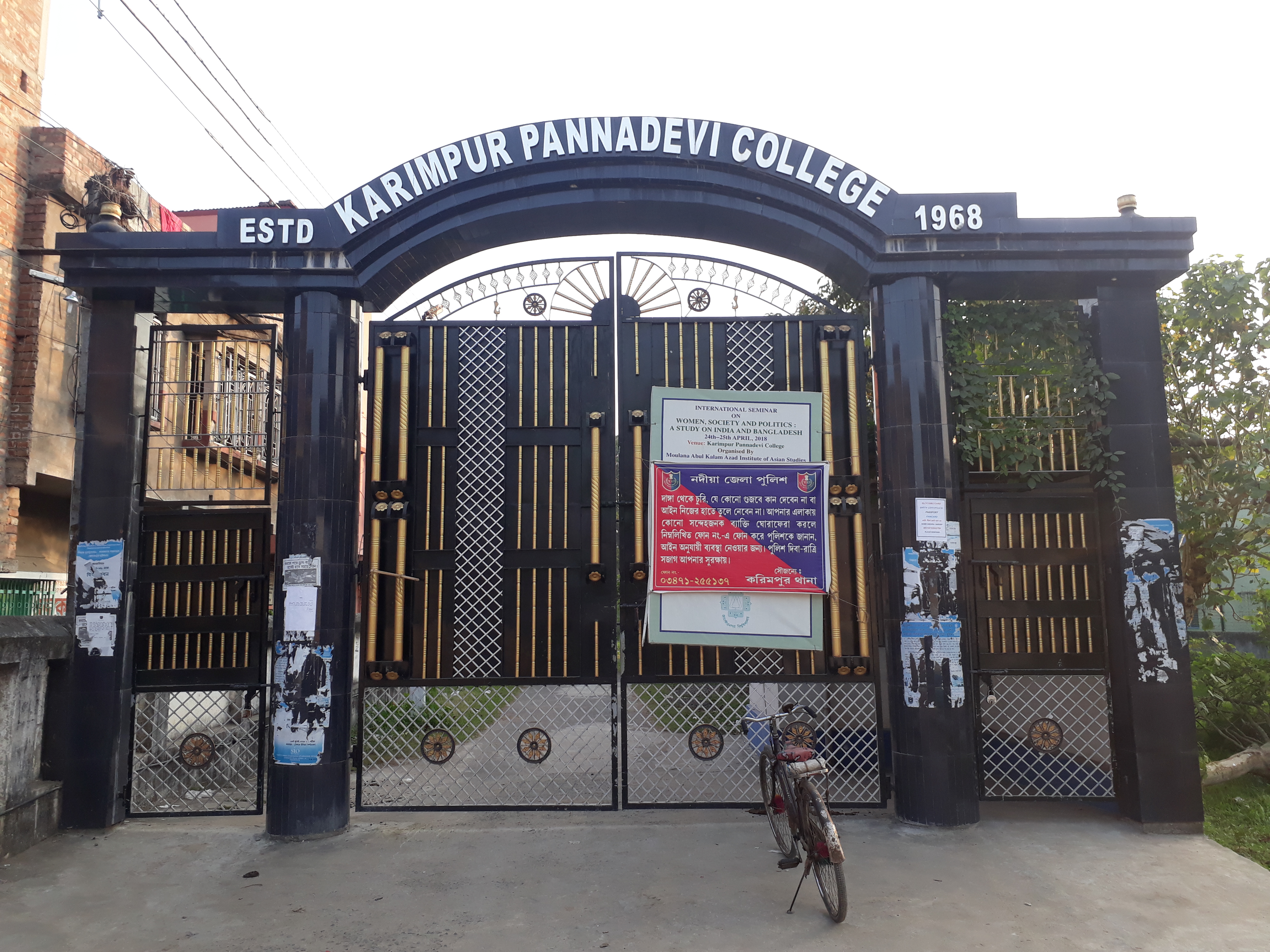
Karimpur Pannadevi College

Karimpur has three high schools: Karimpur Jagannath High School, Karimpur Girls High School and Jamsherpur B.N High School. One undergraduate college named Karimpur Pannadevi College is there.

== Health ==
Karimpur has one rural hospital and many dispensaries. Some specialist doctors visit on a specific day each week in different clinics. The emergency health facilities are limited: the district hospital is about 70 km (43 mi) away at the district headquarter, Krishnanagar.

== Communication ==
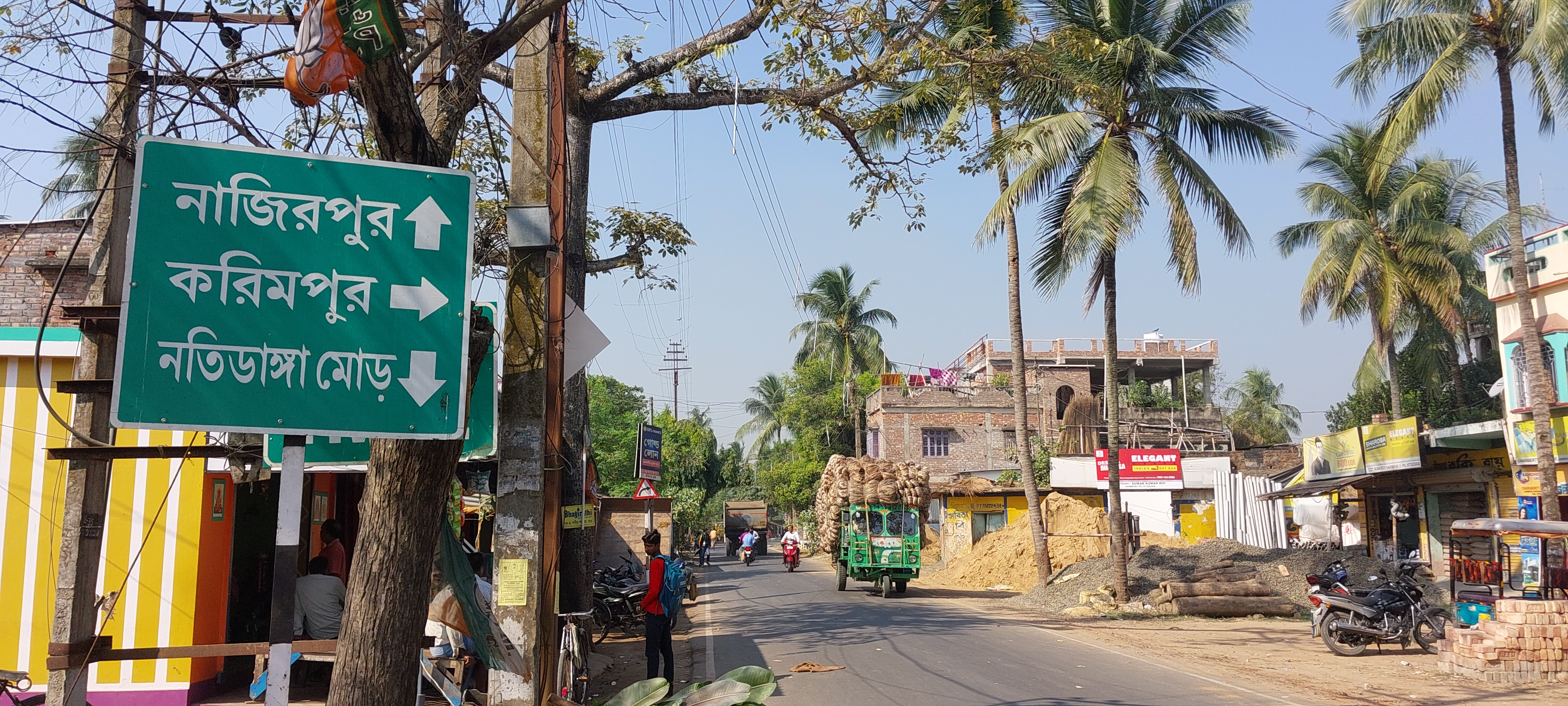
Karimpur Natidanga More crossing

The town is situated near the international border of India-Bangladesh (25 km (16 mi) from the town). West Bengal state highway 11 crosses through it. There is a bus route from Krishnanagar to Karimpur and another from Berhampore to Karimpur.
