= State Highway 11 (West Bengal) =

State highway in West Bengal

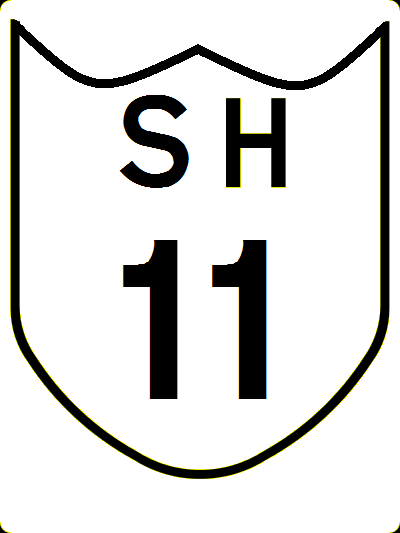
State Highway 11

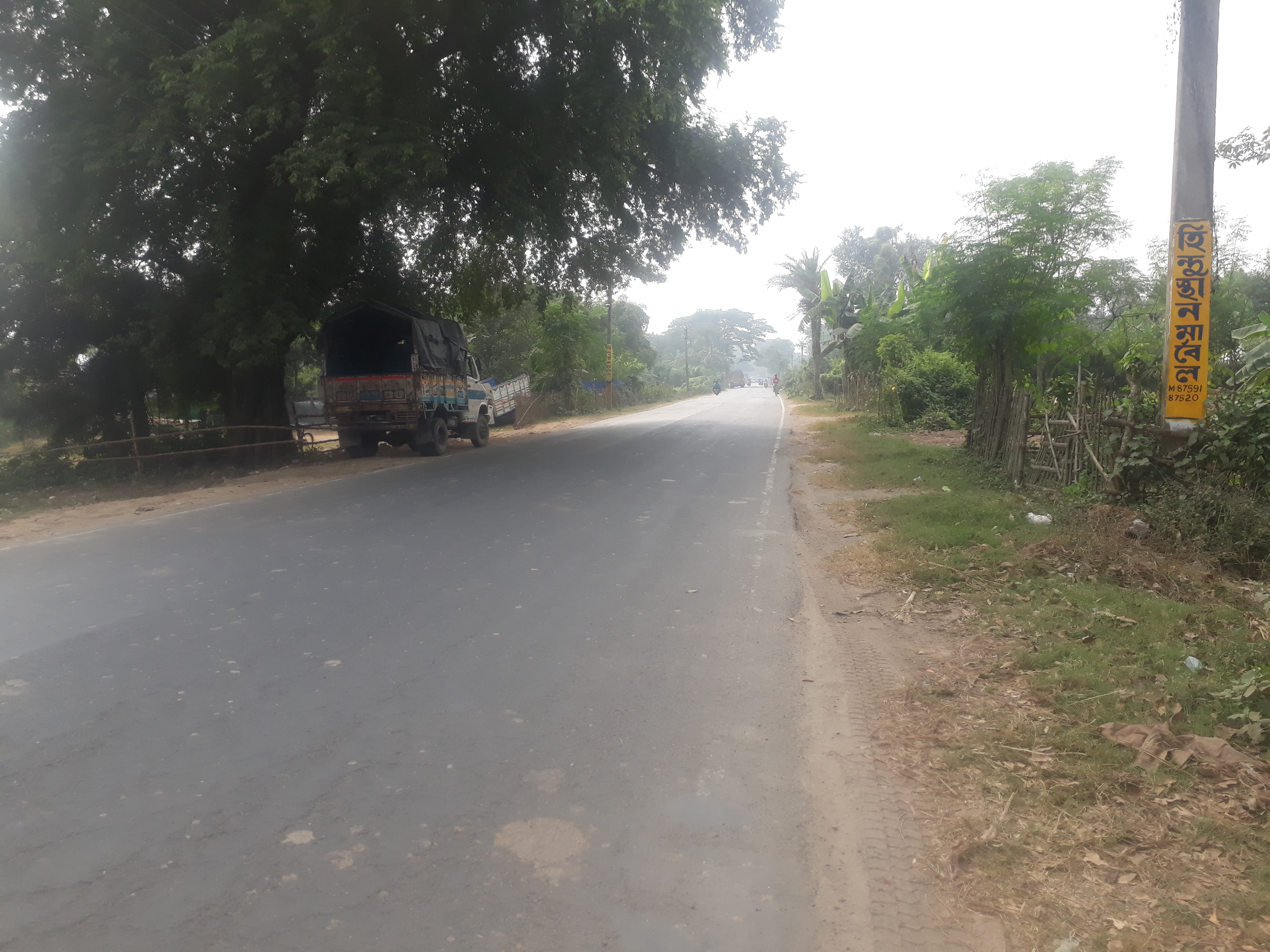

Route information
- Length: 251 km (156 mi)

Major junctions
- From: Junction with NH 14 (the stretch is also known as Panagarh-Morgram Highway) at Mohammad Bazar
- NH 114 and SH 13 north of Tilpara Barrage; Sainthia-Kotasur-Rampurhat Road at Kotasur; SH 7 at Kuli Chowrasta; The Kuli-Khagraghat stretch is also known as Badshahi Road; NH 11 / NH 122A from Radharghat to Baharampur; State Highway 11A at Chunakhali Morh near Mukti Nagar Kids Park; Domkal-Karimpur Road at Karimpur; Natidanga Road at Karimpur; Barbakpur Road at Bajitpur; Murutia Road at Mahish Bathan; SH 14 at Betai; Ranaband Road/ Gongra Road at Chapra; SH 8 at Krishnanagar
- To: Junction with NH 12 at Ranaghat

Location
- Country: India
- State: West Bengal
- Districts: Birbhum, Murshidabad, Nadia

Highway system
- Roads in India; Expressways; National; State; Asian; State Highways in West Bengal

State Highway 11 (West Bengal) is a state highway in West Bengal, India.

== Route ==
SH 11 originates from Mohammad Bazar and passes through Sainthia, Kotasur, Kandi, Gokarna, Baharampur, Muktinagar, Daulatabad, Chhay Ghari, Islampur, Najirpur, Domkal, Sadikhanr Diar, Jalangi, Karimpur, Mahish Bathan, Betai, Tehatta, Chapra, Krishnanagar, Badkulla and Birnagar, before terminating at Ranaghat.

The total length of SH 11 is 251 km.

Districts traversed by SH 11 are:
Birbhum district (0 – 31.7 km)
Murshidabad district (31.7 – 139.7 km)
Nadia district (139.7 – 258.32 km)

== Road sections ==
It is divided into different sections as follows:.

Road Section	District	CD Block	Length (km)
Mohammad Bazar-Sainthia-Sultanpur	Birbhum	Mohammad Bazar, Sainthia Mayureswar II	32
Sultanpur-Kandi-Khagraghat-Baharampur	Murshidabad	Nabagram, Kandi, Berhampore	50
Baharampur-Chunakhali-Jalangi	Murshidabad	Raninagar I, Domkal, Jalangi	50
Jalangi-Karimpur-Tehatta-Krishnanagar	Nadia	Karimpur I, Karimpur II, Tehatta I, Chapra, Krishnaganj	94
Krishnanagar-Ranaghat	Nadia	Krishnanagar I, Santipur, Ranaghat I	25

== See also ==
- List of state highways in West Bengal
