= Jalangi River =

Jalangi River খড়িয়া
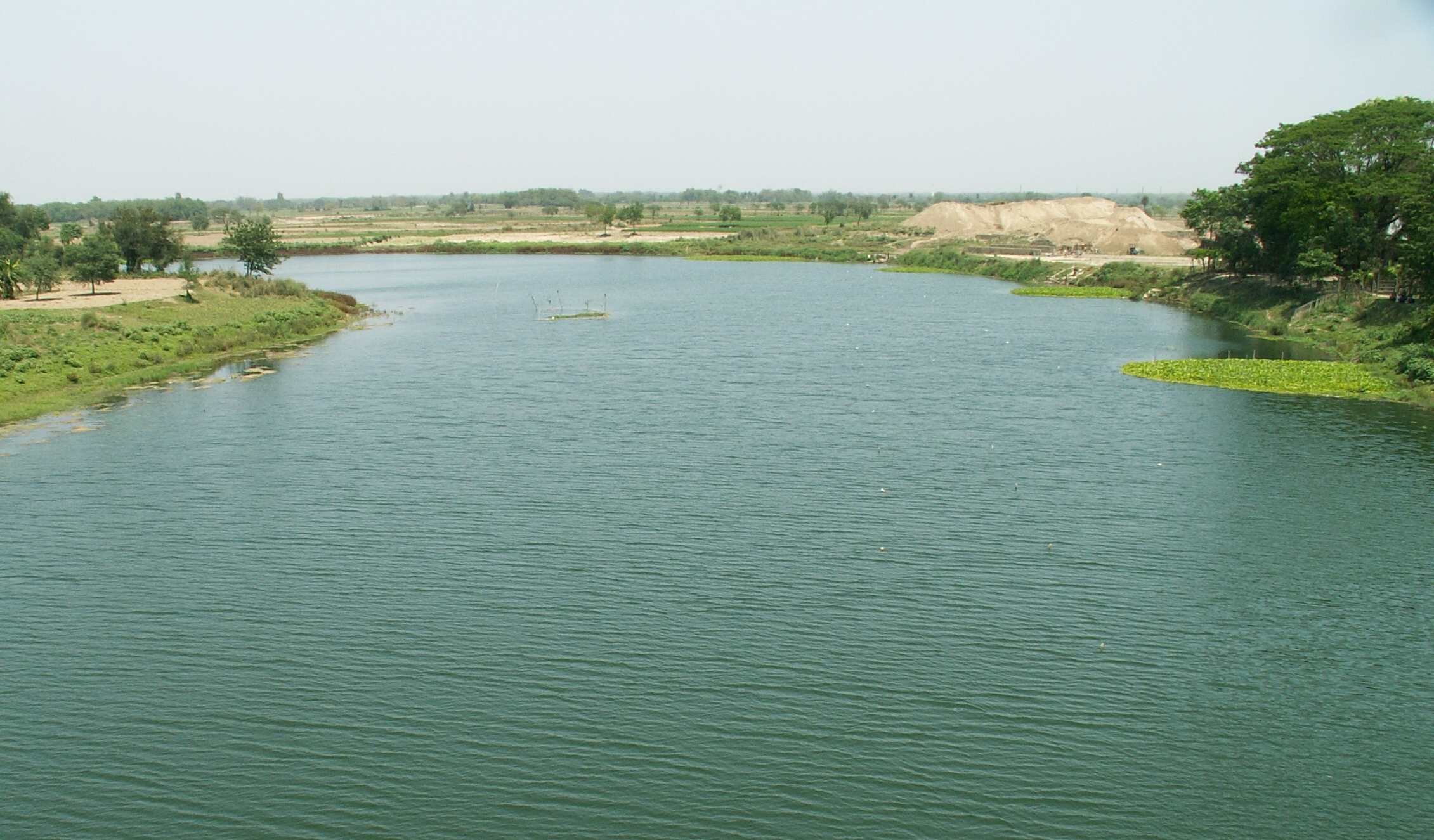

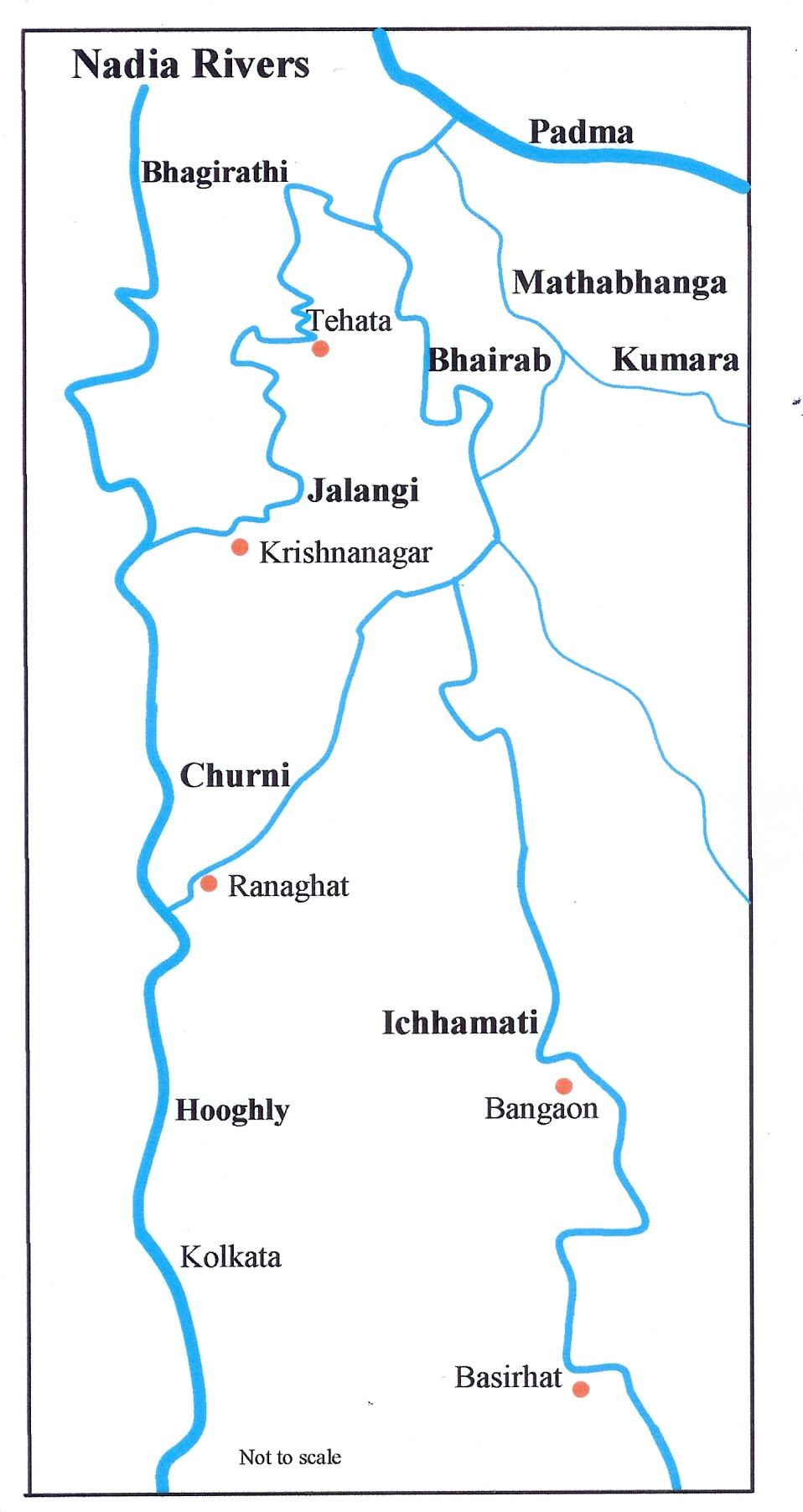
- Native name: জলঙ্গী (Bengali); খড়ে (Bengali)

Location
- Country: India
- State: West Bengal
- Region: One of the three Nadia Rivers
- District: Murshidabad and Nadia
- Cities: Krishnanagar, Tehatta, Mayapur

Physical characteristics
- Source: River Padma
  - location: The Jalangi leaves the Ganges or Padma at Char Madhubona in Karimpur-I, Nadia district
  - coordinates: 20°05′26″N 88°41′53″E
- Mouth: Bhagirathi
  - location: Swarupganj, opposite Nabadwip, the birth-place of Sri Chaitanya
  - coordinates: 23°29′23″N 88°28′57″E
- Length: 233 km (145 mi)
- Basin size: 2,815.33 km^{2} (1,087.00 sq mi)
- Width
  - minimum: 75.89 m (0.04716 mi) at Moktarpur–Chandpur
  - average: 162.58 m (0.10102 mi)
  - maximum: 224.21 m (0.13932 mi) at Moktarpur–Velanagar
- Depth
  - minimum: 0.82 m (0.00051 mi) at Jitpur-Saguna cross section
  - maximum: 7.74 m (0.00481 mi) at Sibpur-Hatishala cross section
- Discharge
  - location: Bhagirathi-Hooghly

Basin features
- Tributaries
  - left: Bhairab Khal (different from Bhairab river and a different channel), Kesto-Raier Khal, Saraswati Khal, Anjana River
  - right: Sialmari, Bhairab River, Chhoto Bhairab, Gobra-Suti Nala, Kalma Khal

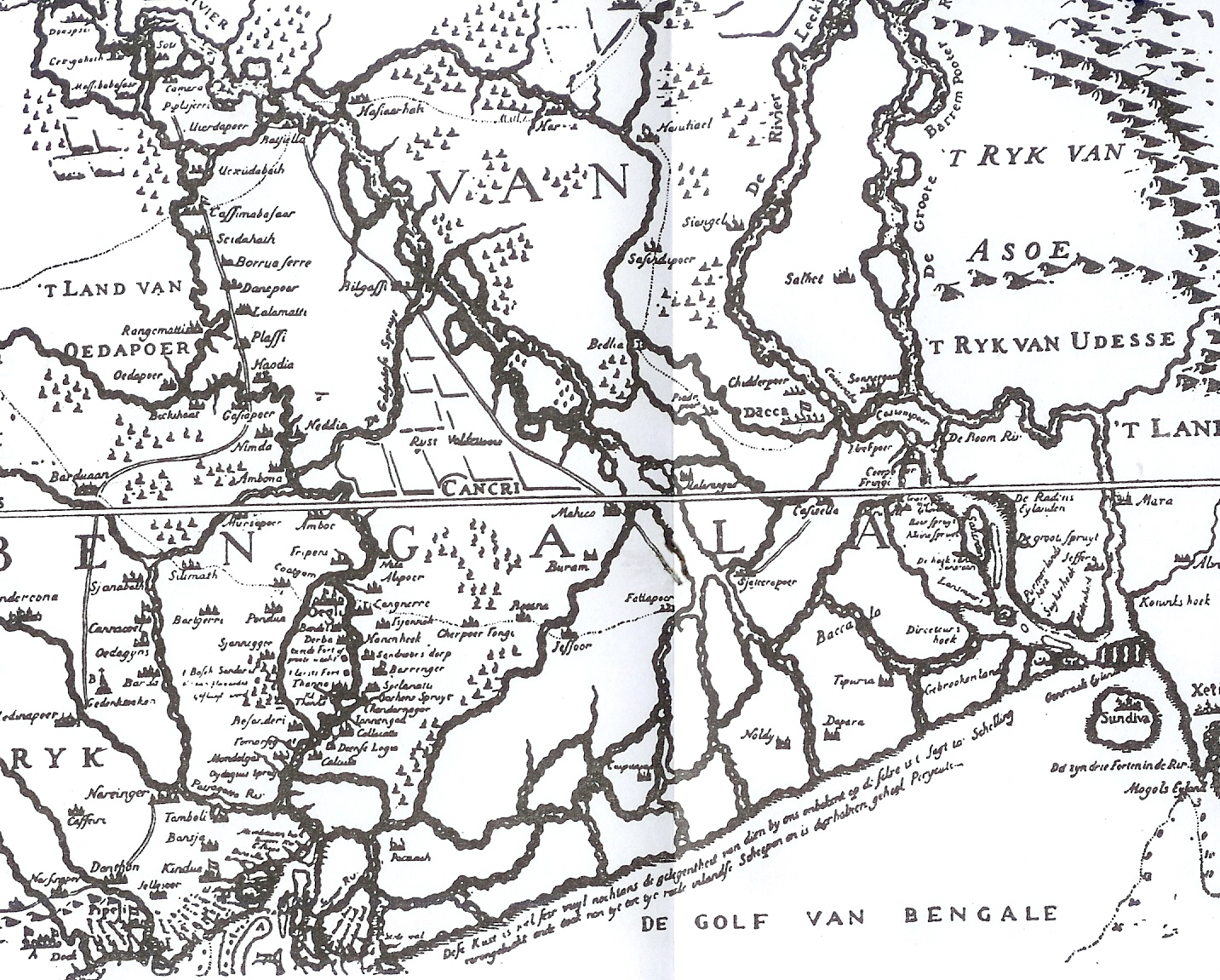
Van den Brouck's map of 1660

Jalangi River (Bengali: জলঙ্গী নদী) is a branch of the Ganges river in Murshidabad and Nadia districts in the Indian state of West Bengal. It flows into the Bhagirathi river and strengthens its lower channel, the Hooghly.

The river below the point where the Jalangi meets the Ganges is known as the Hooghly and the course above it, from the point of its separation from the main flow of the Ganges to its confluence with the Jalangi, is called the Bhagirathi.

Ghurni, a neighbourhood of Krishnanagar, a centre for the production of clay dolls, often referred to as Krishnanagar clay dolls, is located on the banks of the Jalangi. Nabadwip, the birthplace of Chaitanya Mahaprabhu is located in the west bank of the Bhagirathi. Mayapur is located at the confluence of the Jalanagi and Bhagirathi.

== Etymology ==
The name Jalangi derives from two Bengali words Jal (Water) and Angi (who (female) possess body). 'Jalangi' is a Bengali word meaning 'watery body' or 'the body is made of water'. However, the name 'Jalangi' has been derived from that very settlement 'Jalangi' in P.S. Jalangi of Murshidabad district, at which, the river would take-off its supply from river Padma (Majumder, 1995, p-37)

== Course ==
Jalangi is a moribund river of 233 km in length in the Bhagirathi-Hooghly basin. The river is simultaneously a distributary of the river Padma and a tributary of the river Bhagirathi. The reach of 9.1 km from abandoned off-take at Char Madhubona near Gopalpur (Ghat) to Sialmari confluence at Kopila is erased out from the map of the region and 41.9 km from Sialmari confluence to Bhairab-Jalangi confluence at Moktarpur, though traceable but dead at present. The reach downstream to the Bhairab-Jalangi confluence up to Jalangi-Bhagirathi confluence at Swarupganj (182 km) is being maintained by the base flow of seepage water, contribution of Bhairab, and other spills during two months of the rainy season.

The Jalangi leaves the Ganges or Padma at the extreme north of the Nadia district at 24°05´26´´ N and 88°41´53´´ E and joins the river Bhagirathi at Swarupganj (23°24´42´´ N and 88°22´50´´ E), opposite Nabadwip, the birth-place of Sri Chaitanya.

1. Offtake at Char-Madhubona to Sialmari Confluence at Kopila 9.10 km (Untraceable) 2. Sialmari Confluence at Kopila to Bhairab Confluence at Moktarpur 41.9 km (Dead) 3. Bhairab Confluence at Moktarpur to Suti Confluence at Bali-Tungi 42.7 km 4. Suti Confluence at Bali-Tungi to Kalma Khal Confluence at Radhanagar 55.2 km 5. Kalma Khal Confluence at Radhanagar to Bhagirathi-Jalangi Confluence at Swarupganj 84.1 km

Total length from Offtake at Char-Madhubona to Bhagirathi-Jalangi Confluence at Swarupganj 233 km

== Changes in the course of rivers ==
The Jalangi is a modern stream, but its age is not known. Apparently it opened up long after the Bhairab River ran as a strong stream in a south easterly direction. Although it is generally believed that the river has opened up within the last few hundred years, there is no direct evidence of this. It is shown in Van den Brouck's map.

The Bhairab once flowed from the Ganges, across the present beds of the Jalangi, and further eastwards towards Faridpur. The Bhairab is no more a very active river. The Mathabhanga is a younger stream than Jalangi and it was not till very recently that the river completed its junction with the Hooghly by adopting the Churni (now its lower reaches) for its main course. Earlier most of the water of the Mathabhanga ran off to the east down the Kumara, Chitra, Coboduk (Bhairab), and Ichamati, but all these escape routes have been shut off, except a small amount for the Ichamati.

The point to note is that while earlier the rivers in the region flowed in a south-easterly direction, but later some force pulled the Jalangi and the Mathabhanga in a south-westerly direction. The inference is that it occurred because of a local subsidence, which was active for some period prior to 1750 and which has since become inactive.

== Erosion ==
Erosion of the banks is not only a problem for the more turbulent rivers such as Padma and Bhagirathi, but also comparatively smaller rivers such as Jalangi. In 2006, the state government sanctioned Rs. 7 crore for anti-erosion work in the Jalangi River.

== Bridge ==
At present, there are 4 complete road-bridges and 2 rail-bridges on the Jalangi. Two are left incomplete road bridges. One railway bridge is also awaiting completion. The complete and incomplete bridges are:

List of Bridges on the river Jalangi
Sl. No.	Name of the bridge (year of inauguration)	Location of Road crossings	Latitude/ Longitude	Present status
1	Old Rail Bridge at Krishnagar (1905)	On Sealdah-Lalgola Railway at Krishnagar	23°24´48´´ N and 88°28´11´´ E	Complete
2	New Rail Bridge at Krishnagar (2012)	On Sealdah-Lalgola Railway at Krishnagar	23°24´48´´ N and 88°28´12´´ E	Complete
3	Dwijendra Setu, named by Honorable Pūrta& Sarak minister Sri Kshiti Goswami on 21st July 1995	On NH 12 (Formerly NH-34) at Krishnagar	23°24´48´´ N and 88°28´16´´ E	Complete
4	Highway Bridge-II, Krishnagar (2023)	On NH-12 at Krishnagar	23°24´48´´ N and 88°28´17´´ E	Complete
5	3rd Railway bridge at Krishnagar (under construction since 2023)	On Sealdah-Lalgola Railway at Krishnagar	23°24´48´´ N and 88°28´10´´ E	Under construction
6	Karimpur-Bakshipur road bridge	On Karimpur-Domkal Road	23°58′58″ N and 88°37′20″ E	Left Incomplete
7	Fazilnagar–Amtala Bridge	On proposed Fazilnagar–Amtala Road	23°55′48″ N and 88°27′32″ E	Left Incomplete
8	Radhanagar–Patikabar bridge	On Radhanagar–Patikabari–Nawda–Amtala Road	23°49′20″ N and 88°28′14″ E	Complete
9	Dwijendralal Setu, inaugurated by Honorable Pūrta & Ābāsanan Minister Sri Jatin Chakraborty on 1st July 1979	On Palashipara-Tehatta Road	23°47′48″ N and 88°27′09″ E	Complete

== Bengali poetry ==
- The Jalangi is emotionally referred to by the modern Bengali poet Jibanananda Das in his poem abar asibo phire:

"abar asibo ami banglar nodi math khet bhalobeshe
jalangir dheuey bheja banglar e shobuj korun dangaey"

(When again I come, smitten by Bengal's rivers and fields, to this
Green and kindly land, Bengal, moistened by the Jalangi river's waves.)

- Lyricist Sagar Chattapadhyaya and folk singer Bablu Halder's song is well known regarding the Jalangi river.

Oo Amar Jalangi Nadi,
Tor Kolete Roilam Ami, Janamo Abodhi

== Gallery ==
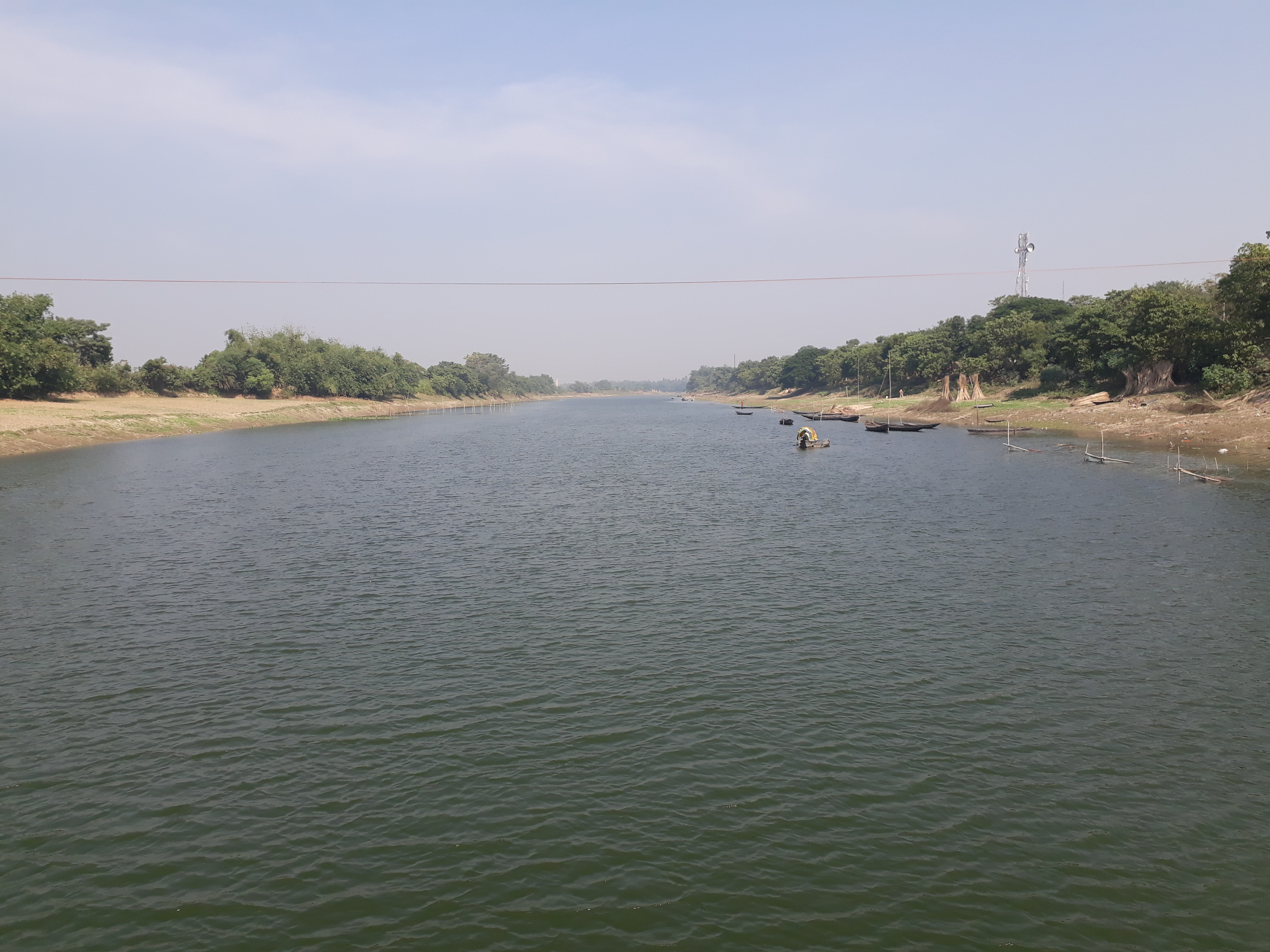
Jalangi river in Tehatta

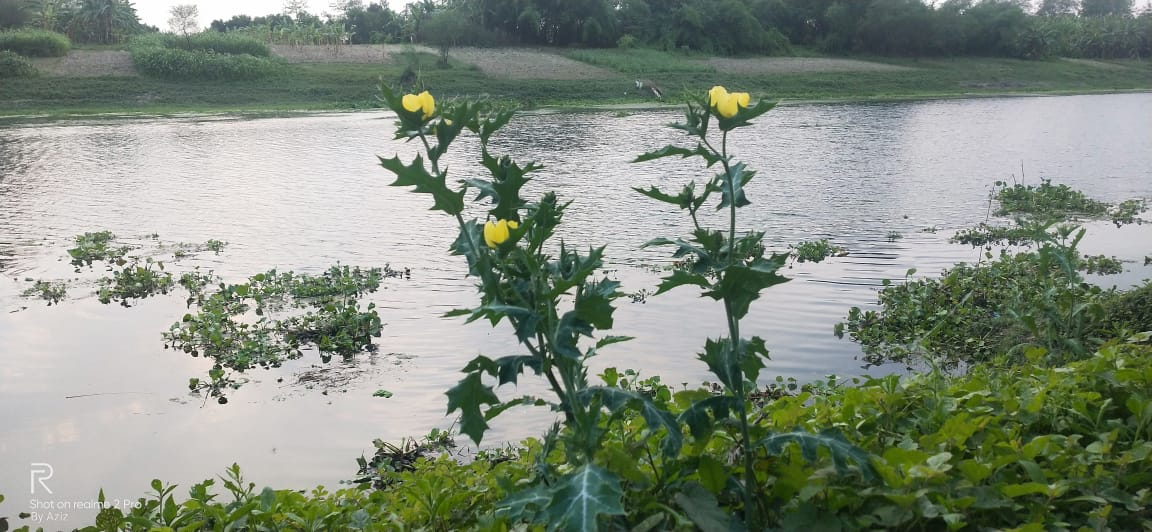
Beauty of Jalangi River (Pricky Poppy flowers)

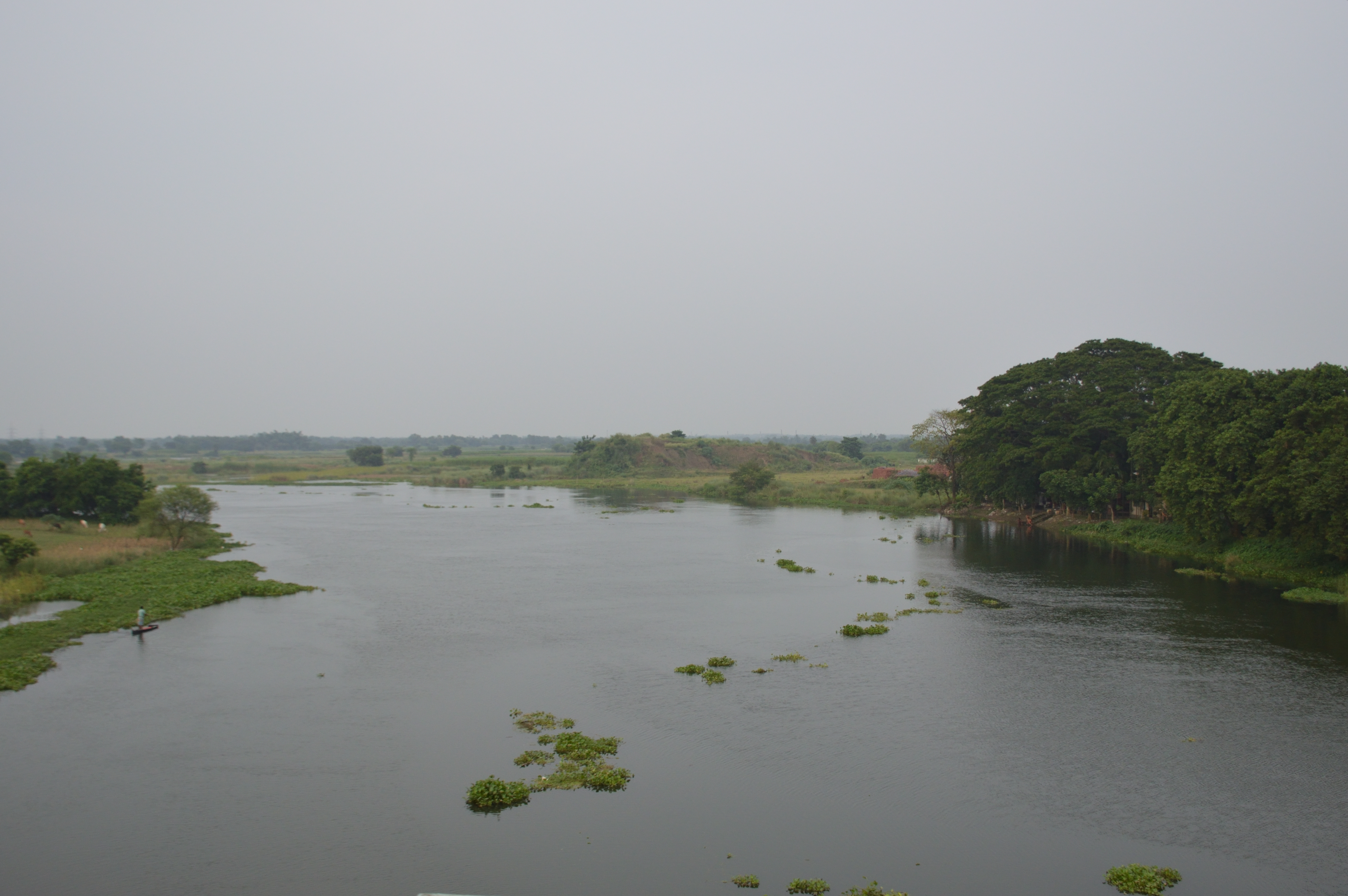
River Jalangi at Krishnanagar

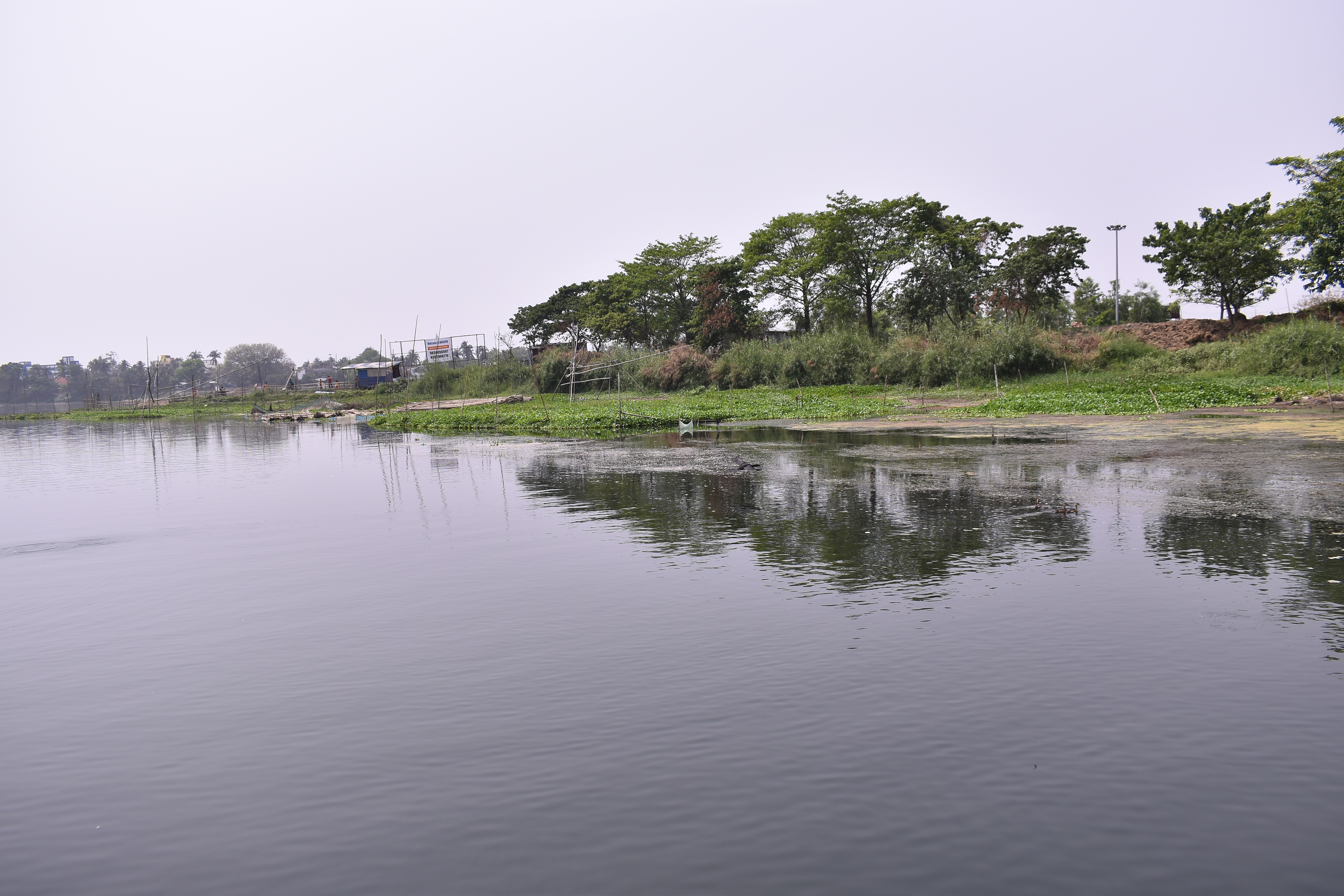
Jalangi River near Mayapur, Nadia

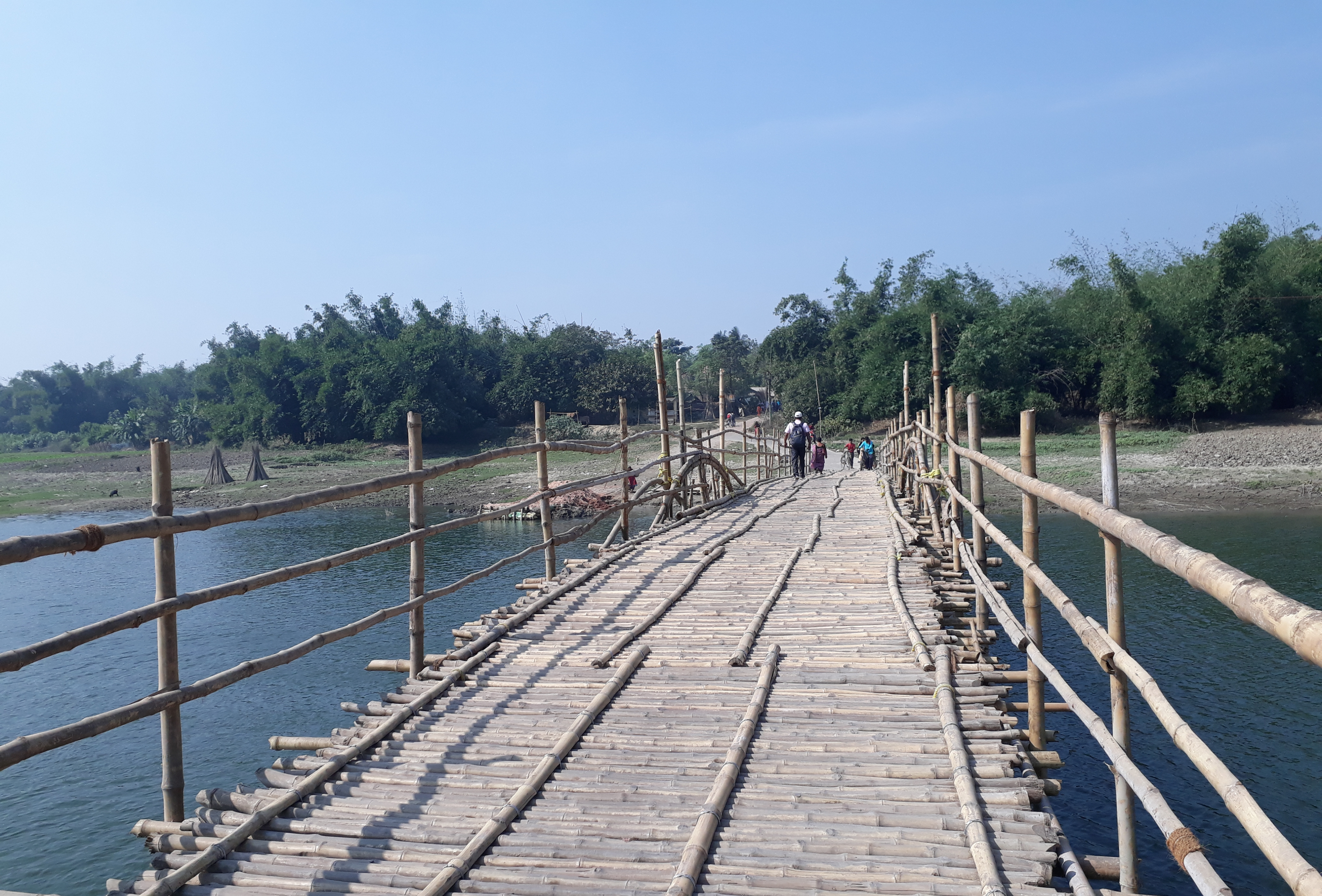
A local bridge on Jalangi river

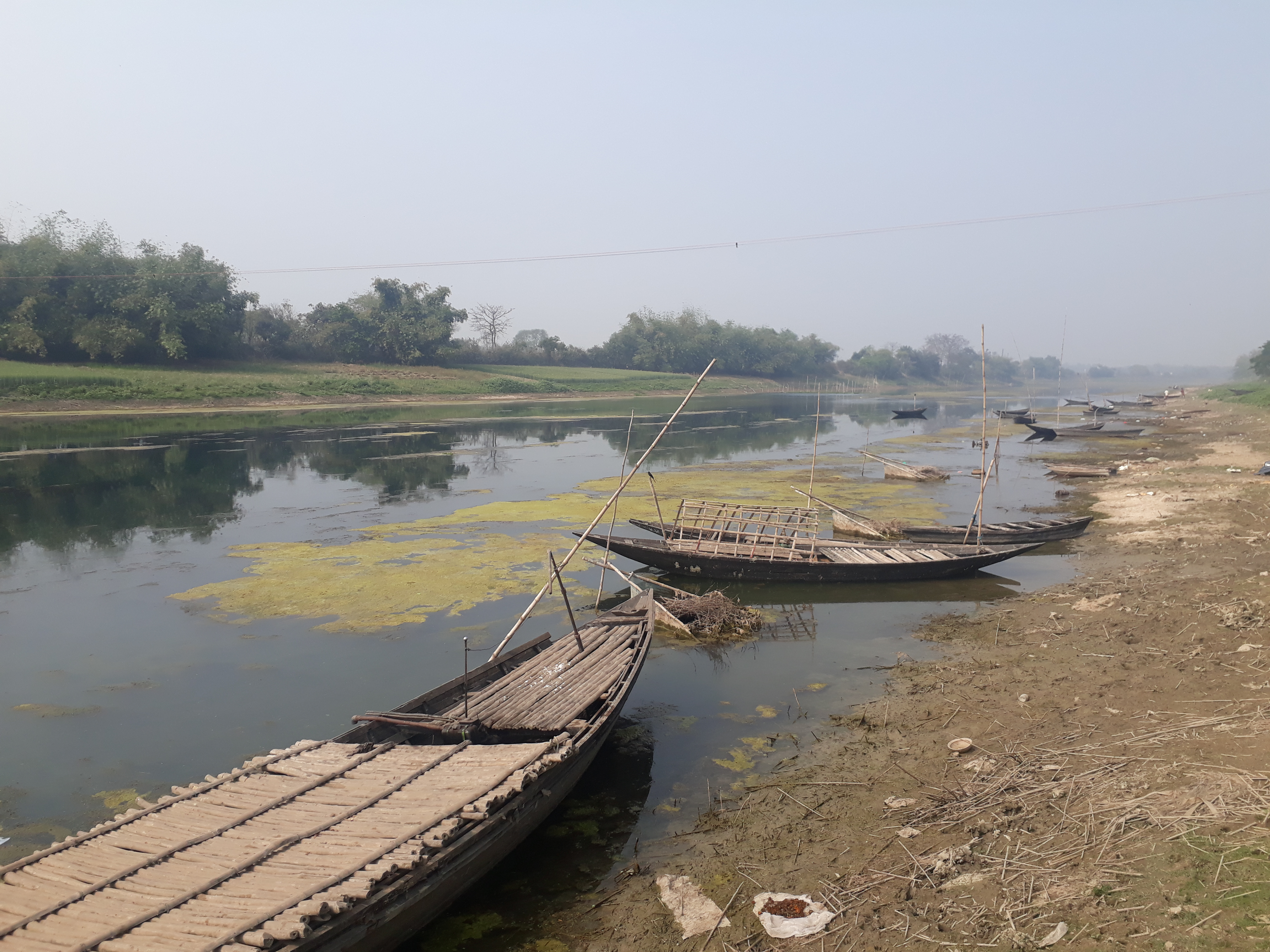
Village boats in Jalangi River
