= By-elections to the 17th West Bengal Assembly =

The By-elections for the 17th West Bengal Legislative Assembly were a series of by-elections held to fill vacant seats in the West Bengal Legislative Assembly between 2021 and 2025. Vacancies arose due to the deaths, resignations, or disqualifications of sitting members of the legislative assembly (MLAs). The by-elections were conducted by the Election Commission of India (ECI). The All India Trinamool Congress (AITC or TMC) won the majority of the contested seats during this period.

== 2021 ==
Date	Constituency		Previous MLA		Reason	Elected MLA	
30 September 2021	159	Bhabanipur	Sovandeb Chattopadhyay	Trinamool Congress	Resigned on 21 May 2021	Mamata Banerjee	Trinamool Congress
30 October 2021	7	Dinhata	Nisith Pramanik	Bharatiya Janata Party	Resigned on 12 May 2021	Udayan Guha	Trinamool Congress
30 October 2021	86	Santipur	Jagannath Sarkar	Bharatiya Janata Party	Resigned on 12 May 2021	Braja Kishore Goswami	Trinamool Congress
30 October 2021	109	Khardaha	Kajal Sinha	Trinamool Congress	Died on 25 April 2021	Sovandeb Chattopadhyay	Trinamool Congress
30 October 2021	127	Gosaba	Jayanta Naskar	Trinamool Congress	Died on 19 June 2021	Subrata Mondal	Trinamool Congress

== 2022 ==
Date	Constituency		Previous MLA		Reason	Elected MLA	
12 April 2022	161	Ballygunge	Subrata Mukherjee	Trinamool Congress	Died on 4 November 2021	Babul Supriyo	Trinamool Congress

== 2023 ==
Date	Constituency		Previous MLA		Reason	Elected MLA	
27 February 2023	60	Sagardighi	Subrata Saha	Trinamool Congress	Died on 29 December 2022	Bayron Biswas	Indian National Congress
5 September 2023	15	Dhupguri	Bishnu Pada Roy	Bharatiya Janata Party	Died on 25 July 2023	Nirmal Chandra Roy	Trinamool Congress

== 2024 ==
Date	Constituency		Previous MLA		Reason	Elected MLA	
7 May 2024	62	Bhagabangola	Idris Ali	Trinamool Congress	Died on 16 February 2024	Reyat Hossain Sarkar	Trinamool Congress
1 June 2024	113	Baranagar	Tapas Roy	Trinamool Congress	Resigned on 4 March 2024	Sayantika Banerjee	Trinamool Congress
10 July 2024	35	Raiganj	Krishna Kalyani	Bharatiya Janata Party	Resigned on 27 March 2024	Krishna Kalyani	Trinamool Congress
10 July 2024	90	Ranaghat Dakshin	Mukut Mani Adhikari	Bharatiya Janata Party	Resigned on 19 April 2024	Mukut Mani Adhikari	Trinamool Congress
10 July 2024	94	Bagdah	Biswajit Das	Bharatiya Janata Party	Resigned on 19 April 2024	Madhuparna Thakur	Trinamool Congress
10 July 2024	167	Maniktala	Sadhan Pande	Trinamool Congress	Died on 20 February 2022 (Note: The seat fell vacant due to the death of sitting MLA Sadhan Pande on 20 February 2022. However, by-polls to the seat couldn't be held even after 6 months of Pande's death (according to Indian law) because BJP candidate Kalyan Chaubey filed an election petition in the Calcutta High Court alleging irregularities in polling & demanded a recount of votes. The Representation of the People Act, 1951 forbids holding any polls to the seat until any election petition concerning that seat hasn't been resolved at the court. On 29 April 2024, Choubey withdrew his election petition from the court, making way for by-poll to the seat.)	Supti Pandey	Trinamool Congress
13 November 2024	6	Sitai	Jagadish Basunia	Trinamool Congress	Elected to Lok Sabha on 4 June 2024	Sangita Roy	Trinamool Congress
13 November 2024	14	Madarihat	Manoj Tigga	Bharatiya Janata Party	Elected to Lok Sabha on 4 June 2024	Jay Prakash Toppo	Trinamool Congress
13 November 2024	104	Naihati	Partha Bhowmick	Trinamool Congress	Elected to Lok Sabha on 4 June 2024	Sanat Dey	Trinamool Congress
13 November 2024	121	Haroa	Haji Nurul Islam	Trinamool Congress	Elected to Lok Sabha on 4 June 2024	Sheikh Rabiul Islam	Trinamool Congress
13 November 2024	236	Medinipur	June Malia	Trinamool Congress	Elected to Lok Sabha on 4 June 2024	Sujoy Hazra	Trinamool Congress
13 November 2024	251	Taldangra	Arup Chakraborty	Trinamool Congress	Elected to Lok Sabha on 4 June 2024	Falguni Singhababu	Trinamool Congress

== 2025 ==
Date	Constituency		Previous MLA		Reason	Elected MLA	
19 June 2025	80	Kaliganj	Nasiruddin Ahamed	Trinamool Congress	Died on 1 February 2025	Alifa Ahmed	Trinamool Congress
