= Kaliganj =

Kaliganj may refer to:

== Localities in Bangladesh ==
- Kaliganj Upazila, Gazipur
- Kaliganj Upazila, Jhenaidah
- Kaliganj Upazila, Lalmonirhat
- Kaliganj Upazila, Satkhira

== Localities in India ==
- Kaliganj, Nadia, village in Nadia district, West Bengal
- Kaliganj (community development block), administrative division in Nadia district, West Bengal
- Kaliganj (Vidhan Sabha constituency), constituency in West Bengal

== Other uses ==
- Kaliganj massacre
