= Juranpur =

Juranpur may refer to:

- Juranpur Satipith, a Shakti Peetha in Nadia district, West Bengal, India
- Juranpur, Nadia, a village in Nadia district, West Bengal, India
