= BCET =

BCET may refer to:

- Best-case execution time, a specific design parameter in real-time computing
- Bengal College of Engineering & Technology, a college in India
