= Alifa Ahmed =

Indian politician

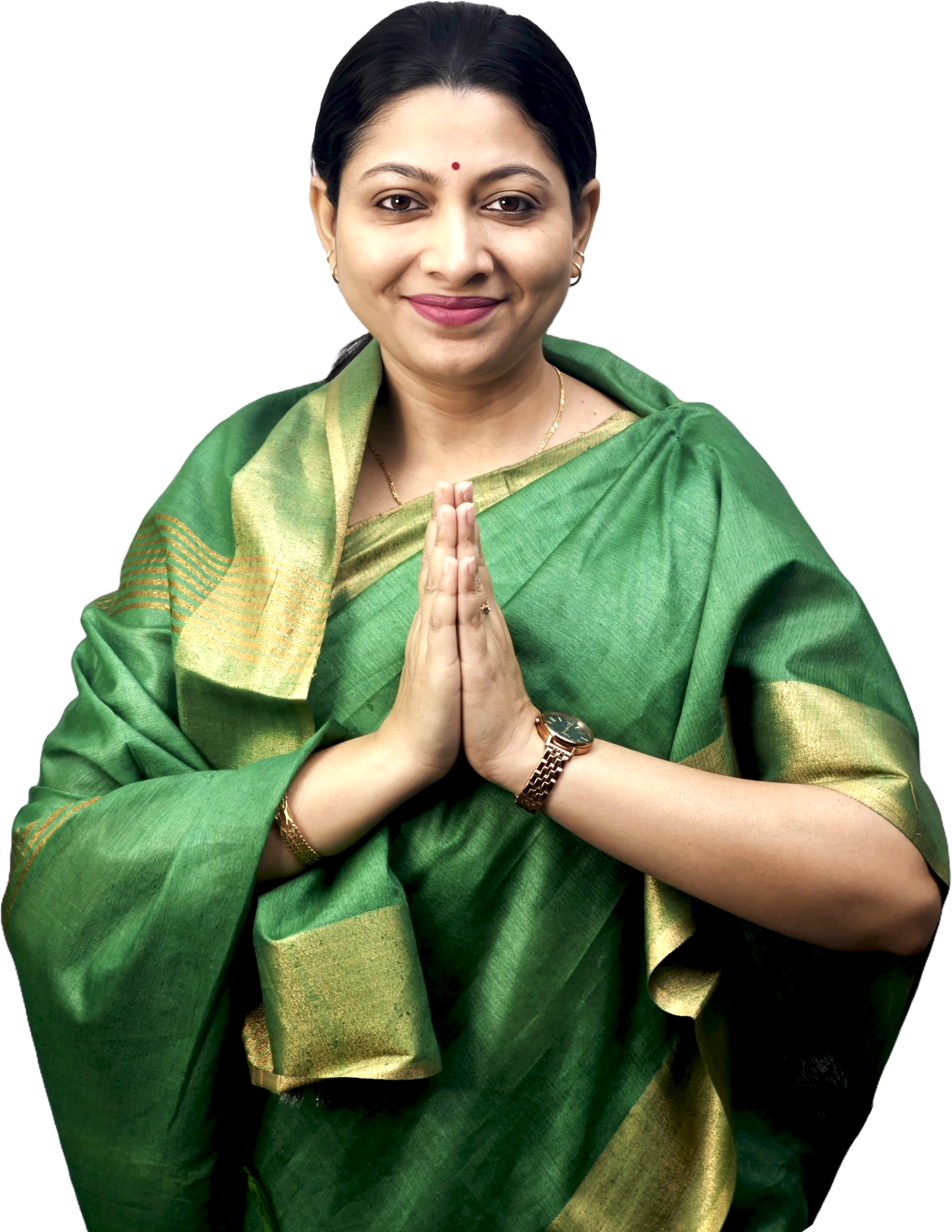

Member of the West Bengal Legislative Assembly
- Incumbent
- Assumed office 23 June 2025
- Preceded by: Nasiruddin Ahamed
- Constituency: Kaliganj

Personal details
- Born: 4 March 1987 (age 39) Kaliganj, Nadia, West Bengal
- Party: Trinamool Congress (until 2026); Democratic Trinamool Congress (from 2026)
- Spouse: Dr. Kabirul Islam
- Children: 2
- Education: Bengal College of Engineering and Technology
- Profession: Politician, Engineer

Alifa Ahmed is an Indian politician from West Bengal. She is elected as a Member of the Legislative Assembly in 2025 By-election from Kaliganj with a margin of more than 50000 votes as a member of the Democratic Trinamool Congress.

== Education ==
She completed her B.Tech from Bengal College of Engineering and Technology, Durgapur, and did her schooling at Holy Family School, Krishnagar.

== Career ==
Alifa Ahmed has over 15 years of experience with Tata Consultancy Services as an Agile Delivery Manager. She was elected as an MLA in the 2025 by-election for the Kaliganj with a winning margin of over 50,000 votes.
