= Mira, Nadia =

Mira
- Census Town
- Location in West Bengal, India Mira (India)
- Coordinates: 23.7706°N 88.2872°E
- Country: India
- State: West Bengal
- District: Nadia

Area
  - Total: 3.7757 km^{2} (1.4578 sq mi)

Population (2011)
  - Total: 14,391
  - Density: 3,811.5/km^{2} (9,871.7/sq mi)

Languages
  - Official: Bengali, English
- Time zone: UTC+5:30 (IST)
- PIN: 741156
- Telephone/STD code: 03471
- Lok Sabha constituency: Krishnanagar
- Vidhan Sabha constituency: Kaliganj
- Website: nadia.gov.in

Mira is a census town and a gram panchayat in the Kaliganj CD block in the Krishnanagar Sadar subdivision of the Nadia district in the state of West Bengal, India.

== Geography ==
Cities and towns in Krishnanagr Sadar subdivision of Nadia district
M: municipal town/ city, CT: census town, R: rural/ urban centre, H: place of historical/ religious interest, T: place of tourist interest.
Owing to space constraints in the small map, the actual locations in a larger map may vary slightly

=== Location ===
Mira is located at 23.7706°N 88.2872°E.

=== Area overview ===
Nadia district is mostly alluvial plains lying to the east of Hooghly River, locally known as the Bhagirathi. The alluvial plains are cut across by such distributaries as Jalangi, Churni and Ichhamati. With these rivers getting silted up, floods are a recurring feature. The Krishnanagar Sadar subdivision, presented in the map alongside, has the Bhagirathi on the west, with Purba Bardhaman district lying across the river. The long stretch along the Bhagirathi has many swamps. The area between the Bhagirathi and the Jalangi, which flows through the middle of the subdivision, is known as Kalantar, a low-lying tract of black clay soil. A big part of the subdivision forms the Krishnanagar-Santipur Plain, which occupies the central part of the district. The Jalangi, after flowing through the middle of the subdivision, turns right and joins the Bhagirathi. On the south-east, the Churni separates the Krishnanagar-Santipur Plain from the Ranaghat-Chakdaha Plain. The east forms the boundary with Bangladesh. The subdivision is moderately urbanized. 20.795% of the population lives in urban areas and 79.205% lives in rural areas.

Note: The map alongside presents some of the notable locations in the subdivision. All places marked in the map are linked in the larger full screen map. All the four subdivisions are presented with maps on the same scale – the size of the maps vary as per the area of the subdivision.

== Demographics ==
According to the 2011 Census of India, Mira had a total population of 14,391, of which 7,346 (51%) were males and 7,045 (49%) were females. Population in the age range 0–6 years was 1,574. The total number of literate persons in Mira was 9,867 (76.98% of the population over 6 years).

== Infrastructure ==
According to the District Census Handbook 2011, Nadia, Mira covered an area of 3.7757 km^{2}. Among the civic amenities, the protected water supply involved BWT, hand pumps, tubewell, borewell. It had 1,318 domestic electric connections. Among the medical facilities it had 1 dispensary/ health centre, 2 charitable hospital/ nursing homes, 4 medicine shops. Among the educational facilities it had were 3 primary schools, 2 middle schools, nearest secondary school, senior secondary school were at Palashi 0.5 km away. It had 12 non-formal education centres (Sarva Siksha Abhiyan). Among the social, recreational and cultural facilities it had 1 cinema theatre, 10 reading rooms. Three important commodities it produced were paddy, jute, oilseed.

== Healthcare ==
There is a primary health centre at Mira, with 10 beds.
