= Hasanuzzaman Sk =

Indian politician

Hasanuzzaman Sheikh
- হাসানুজ্জামান শেখ

Member of the West Bengal Legislative Assembly
- In office 2021–2026
- Preceded by: Safiujjaman Seikh
- Succeeded by: Bharat Kumar Jhawar
- Constituency: Beldanga

Personal details
- Born: c. 1974 (age 51–52) Beldanga, Murshidabad district
- Party: Trinamool Congress since 2021
- Profession: Politician

Hasanuzzaman Sheikh (Bengali: হাসানুজ্জামান শেখ) is a current Trinamool Congress and former Indian National Congress politician from West Bengal.

== Early life and family ==
Hasanuzzaman was born in c. 1974 to a Bengali and Muslim Sheikh family in Beldanga, Murshidabad district. He is the grandson of former Indian Member of Parliament Muhammed Khuda Bukhsh.

== Career ==
He was a Member of the West Bengal Legislative Assembly from 2021, representing Beldanga Assembly constituency as a member of the Trinamool Congress. Previously he served as a Member of the West Bengal Legislative Assembly from 2016, representing Kaliganj Assembly constituency as a member of the Indian National Congress

== See also ==
- 2021 West Bengal Legislative Assembly election
- West Bengal Legislative Assembly
