= Safiujjaman Seikh =

Indian politician

Member of West Bengal Legislative Assembly
- In office 2011–2021
- Preceded by: Md. Refatullah
- Succeeded by: Hasanuzzaman Sk
- Constituency: Beldanga

Personal details
- Party: Indian National Congress
- Profession: Politician

Safiujjaman Seikh is an Indian politician from West Bengal. He was a two time elected Member of the West Bengal Legislative Assembly from 2011 and 2016, representing Beldanga Assembly constituency as a member of the Indian National Congress.

== Political career ==
In the 2011 West Bengal Legislative Assembly election, Seikh was nominated by the Indian National Congress to contest from the Beldanga constituency. He faced the Revolutionary Socialist Party candidate, Md. Refatullah, and won the election with a margin of 13,883 votes, securing a total of 67,888 votes compared to Refatullah's 54,005 votes.

In the 2016 West Bengal Legislative Assembly elections, Seikh received the INC nomination again for the same constituency. This time, he contested against the All India Trinamool Congress candidate, Golam Kibria Mia, and won the election by a margin of 30,281 votes, garnering a total of 87,017 votes, while Mia received 56,736 votes.
