= Beldanga =

Beldanga Beldanga
- Town
- Beldanga
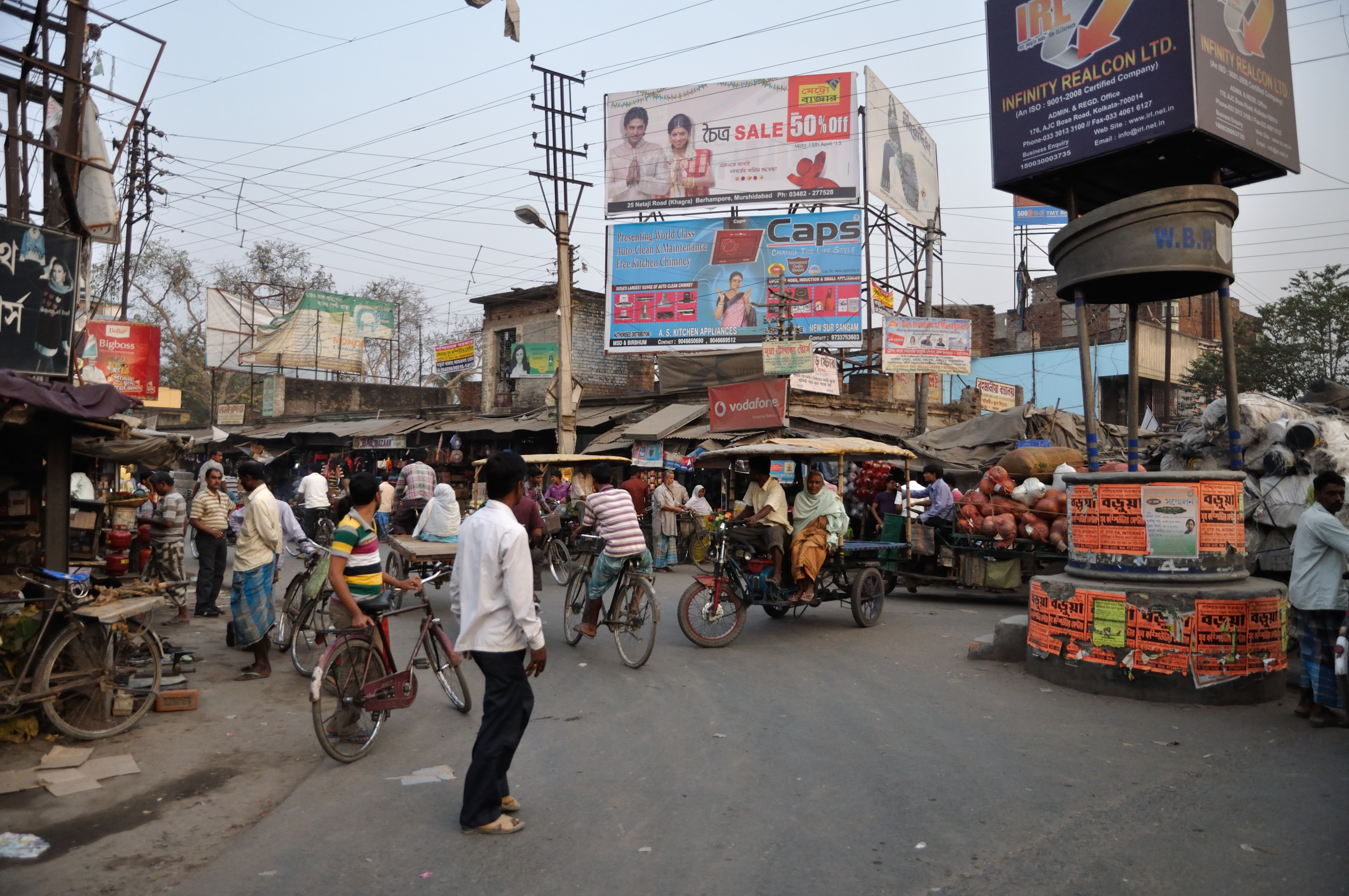
- Barua Crossing, Beldanga
- Nickname: Beldanga
- Location in West Bengal, India Beldanga (India)
- Coordinates: 23.93°N 88.25°E
- Country: India
- State: West Bengal
- District: Murshidabad

Government
  - Type: Municipality
  - Body: Beldanga Municipality
  - Chairman: Anuradha Banerjee (AITC)
  - Vice Chairman: Abu Sufiyan (AITC)
  - MP: Yusuf Pathan (AITC)
  - MLA: Bharat Kumar Jhawar (BJP)

Area
  - Total: 3.98 km^{2} (1.54 sq mi)
- Elevation: 20 m (66 ft)

Population (2011)
  - Total: 29,182
  - Density: 7,330/km^{2} (19,000/sq mi)

Languages
  - Official: Bengali, English
- Time zone: UTC+5:30 (IST)
- PIN: 742133, 742189
- Lok Sabha: Baharampur
- Vidhan Sabha: Beldanga

Beldanga is a municipality town under the Berhampore subdivision of Murshidabad district in the state of West Bengal, India. Beldanga is an important trade centre of this district.

== Geography ==
Cities, towns and locations in the Berhampore and Kandi subdivisions, Murshidabad district
M: municipal town, CT: census town, R: rural/ urban centre, H: historical centres
Owing to space constraints in the small map, the actual locations in a larger map may vary slightly

=== Location ===
Beldanga is located at 23.93°N 88.25°E. It has an average elevation of 20 metres (65 feet).

=== Area overview ===
The area shown in the map alongside, covering Berhampore and Kandi subdivisions, is spread across both the natural physiographic regions of the district, Rarh and Bagri. The headquarters of Murshidabad district, Berhampore, is in this area. The ruins of Karnasubarna, the capital of Shashanka, the first important king of ancient Bengal who ruled in the 7th century, is located 9.6 kilometres (6.0 mi) south-west of Berhampore. The area is overwhelmingly rural with over 80% of the population living in the rural areas.

Note: The map alongside presents some of the notable locations in the subdivisions. All places marked in the map are linked in the larger full screen map.

== Demographics ==
According to the 2011 Census of India, Beldanga had a total population of 29,205, of which 14,694 (50%) were males and 14,511 (50%) were females. Population in the age range 0–6 years was 3,583. The total number of literate persons in Beldanga was 21,169 (82.62% of the population over 6 years).

As per 2001 Census of India, Beldanga had a population of 25,361. Males constitute 52% of the population and females 48%. Beldanga has an average literacy rate of 67%, higher than the national average of 59.5%; with 55% of the literates being male and 45% being female. 13% of the population is under 6 years of age.

== Civic administration ==
=== Police station ===
Beldanga police station has jurisdiction over Beldanga municipal area and a part of Beldanga I CD Block.

== Infrastructure ==
According to the District Census Handbook, Murshidabad, 2011, Beldanga covered an area of 3.98 km^{2}. It had 50.73 km roads with open drains. The protected water-supply involved overhead tank etc. It had 3,713 domestic electric connections, 1,556 road lighting points. Among the medical facilities it had 2 hospitals (with 55 beds).

== Transport ==
Beldanga railway station is well connected with Kolkata via Sealdah-Lalgola Division Railway. National Highway 12 passes through the Barua More, Beldanga town.

== Education ==
=== Colleges ===
- S.R. Fatepuria College
- Beldanga Humayun Kabir Memorial B.Ed college (Kazisaha)

=== High school ===
- Swami Pranabananda Vidyapith (Girls)
- Beldanga C.R.G.S. High School
- Harimati Girl's High School (Girls)
- Hareknagar A.M. Institution
- Beldanga Srish Chandra Vidyapith
- Banipith girls high school (Girls)
- Sarat Pally Balika Vidyalay (Girls)
- Mirzapur H.S.C High School
- Kazisaha High Madrasha
- KUMARPUR BHOLANATH MEMORIAL HIGH SCHOOL
- Bishurpukur High School
- Beldanga Darul Hadeeth Senior Madrasha (Aliah University)
- Al - Ameen Mission Academy, Beldanga

=== Primary School ===
- Pranab Bharati School
- Sishu Niketan (Netaji Park)
- Madda Pranab Bharati
- Beldanga Path bhawan
- Kidzee Beldanga
- Mederdhar Shishu Madrasah
- Mederdhar Primary School

== Healthcare ==
- Beldanga Rural Hospital
- Beldanga Rotary Eye Hospital
- Beldanga Anandalok Hospital

_

== See also ==
- Beldanga I (Community development block)
- Beldanga II (Community development block)
