= Nasiruddin Ahamed =

Indian politician (1954–2025)

- Born: 1954; Kaliganj, Nadia district, West Bengal
- Died: February 2, 2025 (aged 70–71); Kolkata
- Occupation: Indian politician

Nasiruddin Ahamed (1954 – 2 February 2025) was an Indian politician from West Bengal. He was a two–time member of the West Bengal Legislative Assembly from Kaliganj Assembly constituency in Nadia district. He won the 2021 West Bengal Legislative Assembly election representing the All India Trinamool Congress party.

== Early life and education ==
Ahamed was from Kaliganj, Nadia district, West Bengal. He was the son of late Sharifuddin Ahamed. He completed his post graduate course at University of Calcutta in 1974 and did his LLB at Hazra Law College in 1976. He was an advocate before getting elected in 2011.

== Career ==
Ahamed won from Kaliganj Assembly constituency representing the All India Trinamool Congress in the 2021 West Bengal Legislative Assembly election. He polled 111,696 votes and defeated his nearest rival, Abhijit Ghosh of the Bharatiya Janata Party, by a margin of 46,987 votes. He first became an MLA winning the 2011 West Bengal Legislative Assembly election from Kaliganj on Trinamool Congress ticket. He lost the next election in 2016, to Hasanuzzaman Sk of the Indian National Congress by a margin of 1227 votes. But he regained the seat for Trinamool Congress in 2021.

== Death ==
Ahamed died of cardiac arrest on 2 February 2025 at Palasi Hospital in Kolkata.
