= Juranpur Satipith =

Shakta pitha

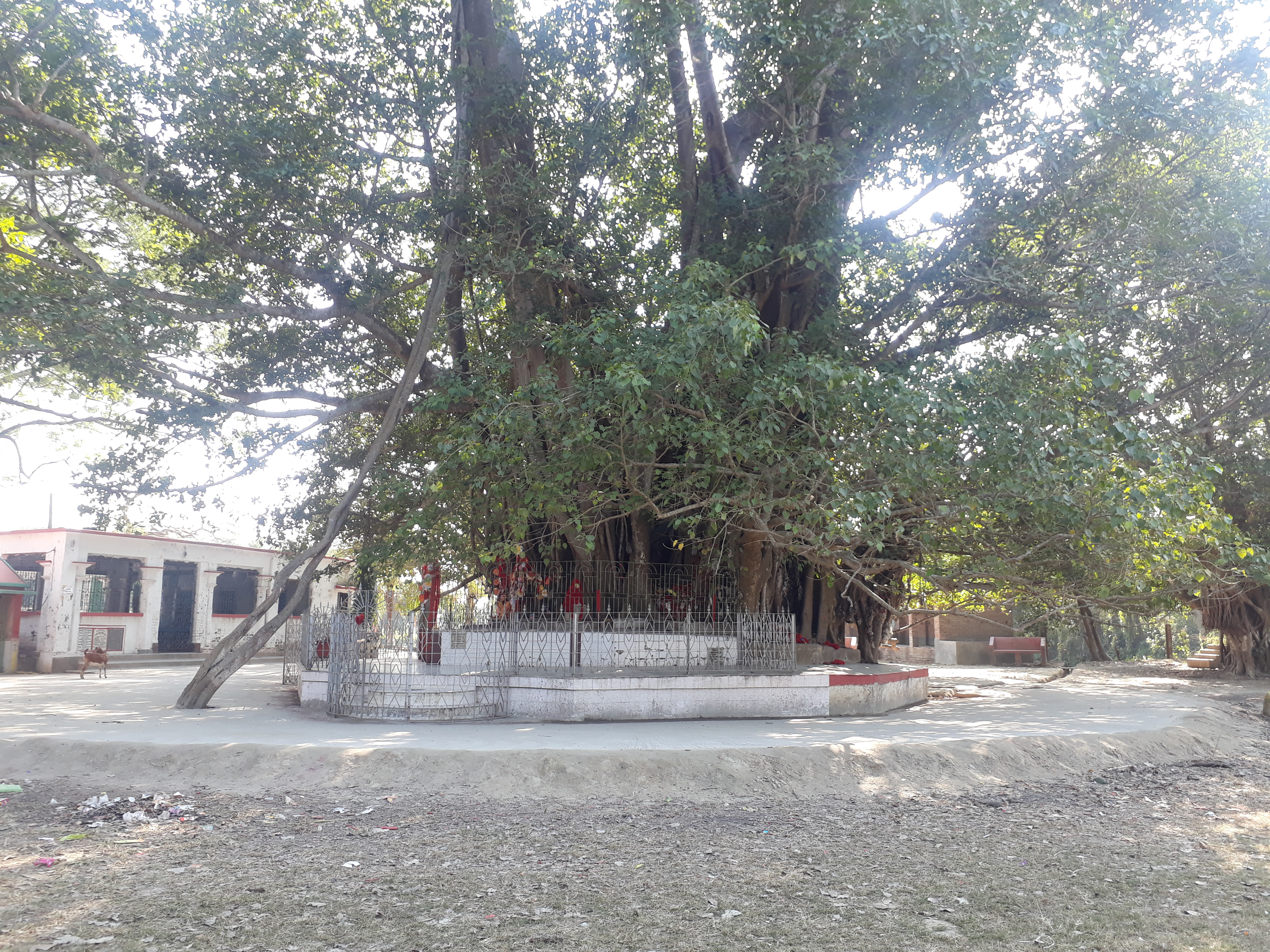
Juranpur Satipith and temple complex

Juranpur Satipith is one of the 51 Hindu holy places (Shakta pithas) in India in the village of Juranpur, under Kaligunge CD Block in Nadia district of West Bengal. According to Hindu mythology the forehead of Goddess Sati was fallen in this place after Daksha Jagga. Juranpur is a place for Hindu pilgrimage. Here a stone is worshipped as Goddess Joy Durga which is placed under a big Banyan tree. By the side of the tree there is a small temple where God is worshipped in the name of Bhairav. Up to the early 19th century, this Pith was situated on the bank of the Bhagirathi River, opposite of Katwa. A fair is organized there every year in Magha Purnima.

== History ==
In this Pith, an underground channel was previously connected to the river Bhagirathi where many saints and revolutionaries took shelter before independence. It was stated that Mohan Lal (general of nawab Sirajuddulla), Hukka Lal (younger son of Maharaja Mohan Lal), Raja Ramkrisna Ray, son of Rani Bhabani took shelter there. All India Yadav Mahasabha President Nabadwip Ghosh of Patna visited this Pith in December 1924. This Pith is now managed by a trust after a Calcutta High Court order on 16 January 1963. In the year 2024 to Supriya Saha and Nilesh Gayen wrote a book named "Juranpur Satipither kotha" on this Satipith, specially on the controversy of this pith and details history of this pith.
