= Bengal College of Engineering & Technology =

College in West Bengal

Bengal College of Engineering and Technology (BCET)
- Motto: Vince te Ipsum (surpass oneself)
- Type: Private
- Established: 2001; 25 years ago
- Affiliations: Maulana Abul Kalam Azad University of Technology
- Chairman: S. K. Sharma
- Principal: P.K Prasad
- Dean: S. K. Brahmachari
- Director: A. C. Ganguly
- Location: DA-8, Sahid Sukumar Banerjee Sarani, Bidhannagar, Durgapur, West Bengal, 713212, India; 23.4735194°N 87.4052633°E
- Campus: Urban area in BidhanNagar (175 km from Kolkata)
- Approvals: AICTE; Department of Higher Education, Government of West Bengal; Ministry of Human Resource Development, Government of India; National Board of Accreditation.
- Website: Bengal College of Engineering and Technology Website
- Location in West Bengal Bengal College of Engineering & Technology (India)

Bengal College of Engineering and Technology, Durgapur or BCET is a self-financing college located in West Bengal, India providing under-graduate as well as post-graduate courses in engineering and technology disciplines. It was established by SKS Educational and Social Trust in 2001. The college is affiliated with Maulana Abul Kalam Azad University of Technology and all the programmes are approved by the All India Council for Technical Education.

It is located at Bidhan Nagar, a locality in Durgapur, West Bengal.

== Academics ==
The institute offers seven undergraduate courses:

- B.Tech. in Electronics and Communication Engineering (ECE)- 4 years [Approved intake - 120]
- B.Tech. in Electrical and electronic engineering (EEE)- 4 years [Approved intake - 60]
- B.Tech. in Electrical Engineering (EE)- 4 years [Approved intake - 60]
- B.Tech. in Mechanical Engineering (ME)- 4 years [Approved intake - 60]
- B.Tech. in Computer Science and Engineering (CSE)- 4 years [Approved intake - 180]
- B.Tech. in Civil Engineering (CE)- 4 years [Approved intake - 60]
- B.Tech. in Information Technology (IT)- 4 years [Approved intake - 180]

The following Postgraduate Degree Programs are offered:

- Master in Business Administration- 2 years [Approved intake - 60]
- Master in Computer Application- 3 years [Approved intake - 60]

== Alumni ==
- Alifa Ahmed MLA of Kaliganj Assembly constituency.

== See also ==
- List of institutions of higher education in West Bengal
- Education in India
- Education in West Bengal
- Dr. B.C. Roy Engineering College, Durgapur
