= Debagram railway station =

Railway station in West Bengal, India

Debagram
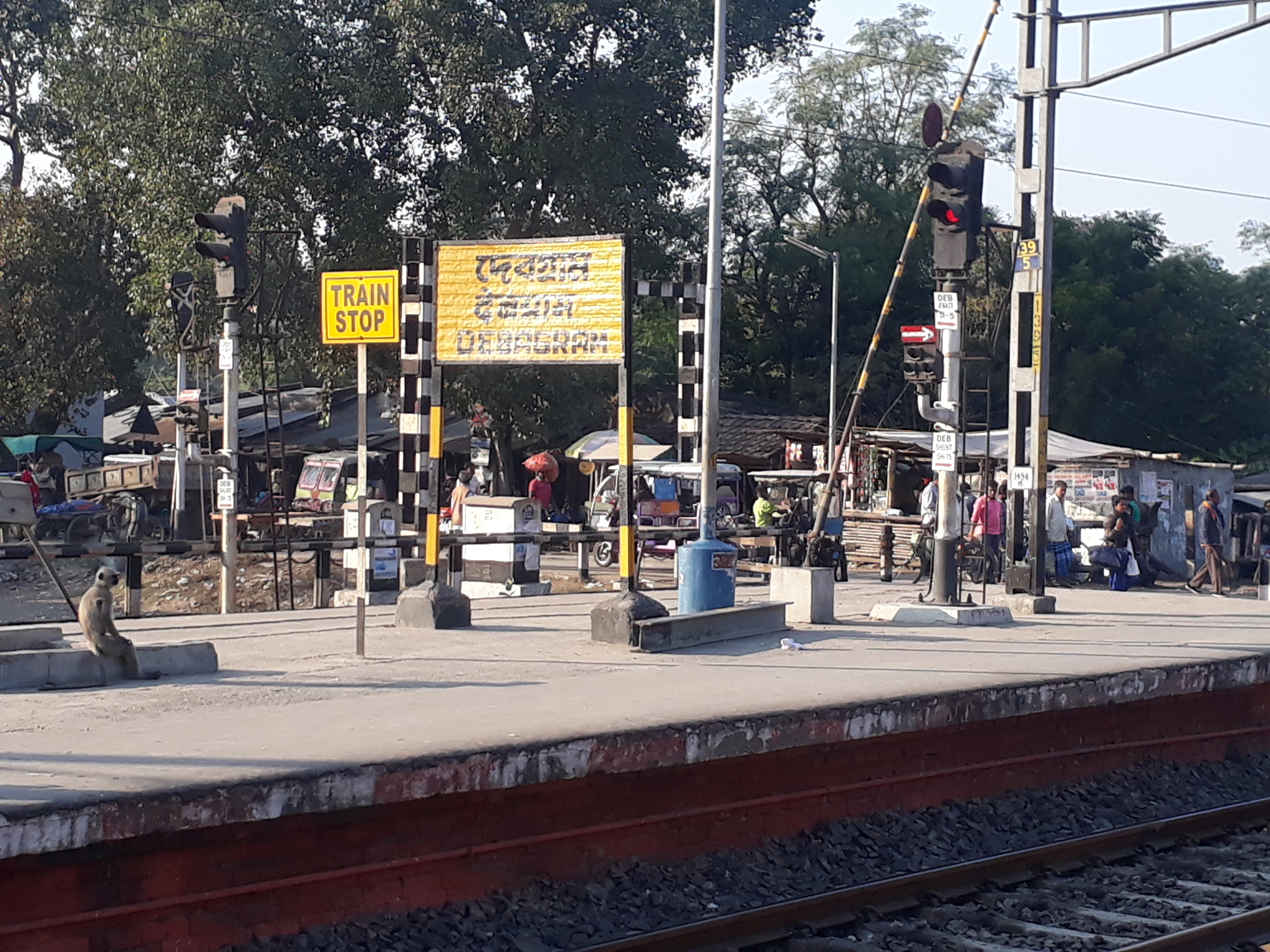

General information
- Location: Station road, Debagram, Nadia district, West Bengal; India
- Coordinates: 23.688776°N 88.307646°E
- Elevation: 18 m (59 ft)
- System: Kolkata Suburban Railway station
- Owner: Indian Railways
- Operator: Eastern Railway
- Line: Krishnanagar–Lalgola line
- Platforms: 3
- Tracks: 2

Construction
- Structure type: At grade
- Parking: Not available
- Cycle facilities: Not available
- Accessible: Not available

Other information
- Status: Functional
- Station code: DEB
- Zone(s): Eastern Railway
- Division(s): Sealdah

History
- Opened: 1905
- Electrified: 2010

Services
Preceding station	Kolkata Suburban Railway	Following station
Sonadanga towards Krishnanagar City Junction	Eastern Line Krishnanagar–Lalgola line	Pagla Chandi towards Lalgola
Route map
Location
- Location within West Bengal Location within India

Debagram railway station is a railway station under the Sealdah railway division of Eastern Railway zone of India. It serves the Debagram and Kaliganj areas and situated in the station road at Debagram on the Lalgola to Krishnanagar line in Nadia, West Bengal. The distance between Sealdah and Debagram is 143 km. Few EMU and Lalgola passengers trains pass through Debagram railway station.

== Electrification ==
The 128 km long Krishnanagar–Lalgola stretch including Debagram railway station was electrified in 2004 for EMU services.
