= Beldanga railway station =

Railway station in West Bengal, India

Beldanga
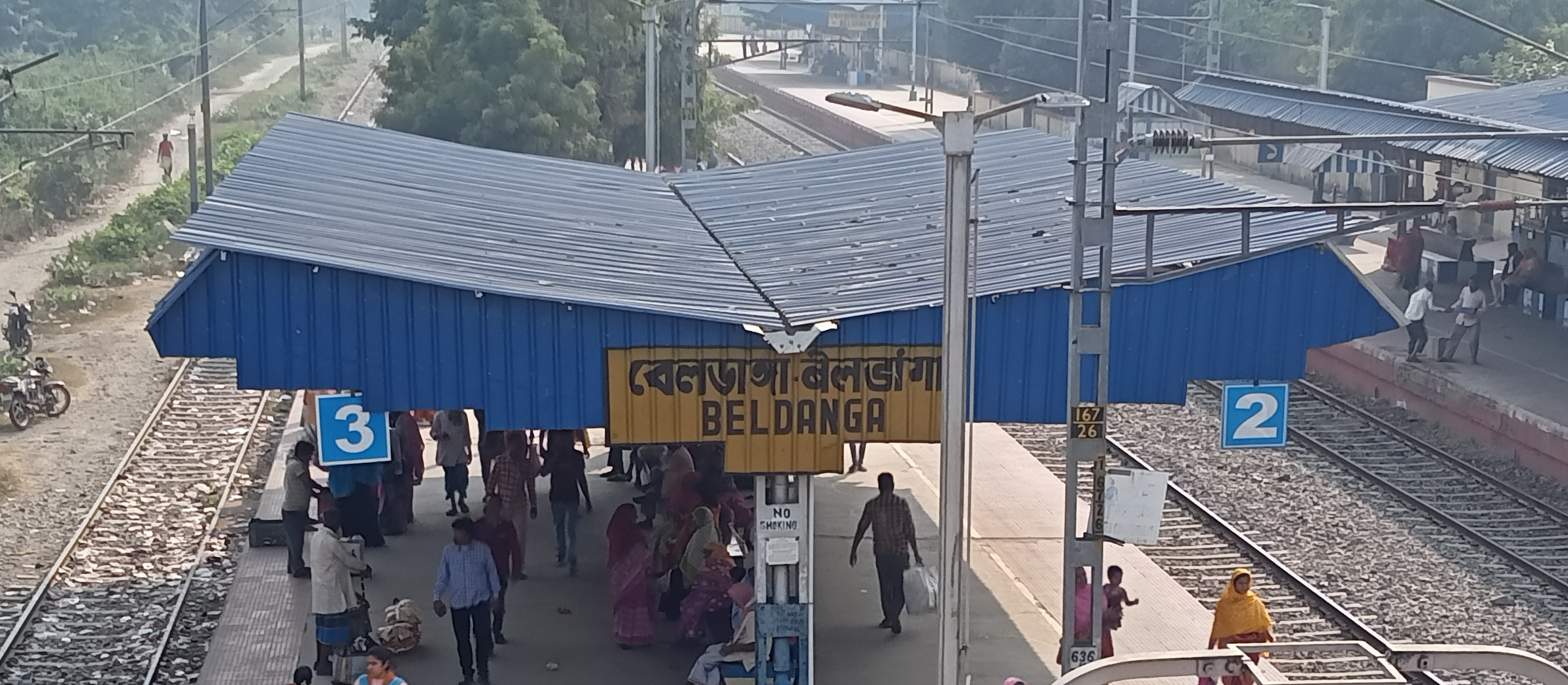

General information
- Location: Beldanga, Murshidabad district, West Bengal; India
- Coordinates: 23.933207°N 88.243027°E
- Elevation: 20 m (66 ft)
- System: Kolkata Suburban Railway
- Owner: Indian Railways
- Operator: Eastern Railway zone
- Line: Sealdah-Lalgola line
- Platforms: 2
- Tracks: 3

Construction
- Structure type: At grade
- Parking: No

Other information
- Status: Active
- Station code: BEB
- Zone(s): Eastern Railway
- Division(s): Sealdah
- Classification: NSG-4

History
- Former names: East Indian Railway Company

Services
| Preceding station | Kolkata Suburban Railway | Following station |
|---|---|---|
| Rejinagar towards Krishnanagar City Junction | Eastern Line Krishnanagar–Lalgola line | Bhabta towards Lalgola |
Location
- Interactive map

Beldanga railway station is a railway station of the Sealdah-Lalgola line in the Eastern Railway zone of Indian Railways. The station is situated beside National Highway 12 at Beldanga in Murshidabad district in the Indian state of West Bengal. It serves Beldanga town and the surrounding villages. Total 34 trains including Hazarduari Express, Lalogola Passengers and few EMUs pass through the station. The distance between Sealdah and Beldanga is 168 kilometres (104 mi).

== Electrification ==
The Krishnanagar–Lalgola Section, including Beldanga railway station was electrified in 2004. In 2010 the line became double tracked.
