= Bhabta railway station =

Railway station in West Bengal, India

BHABTA
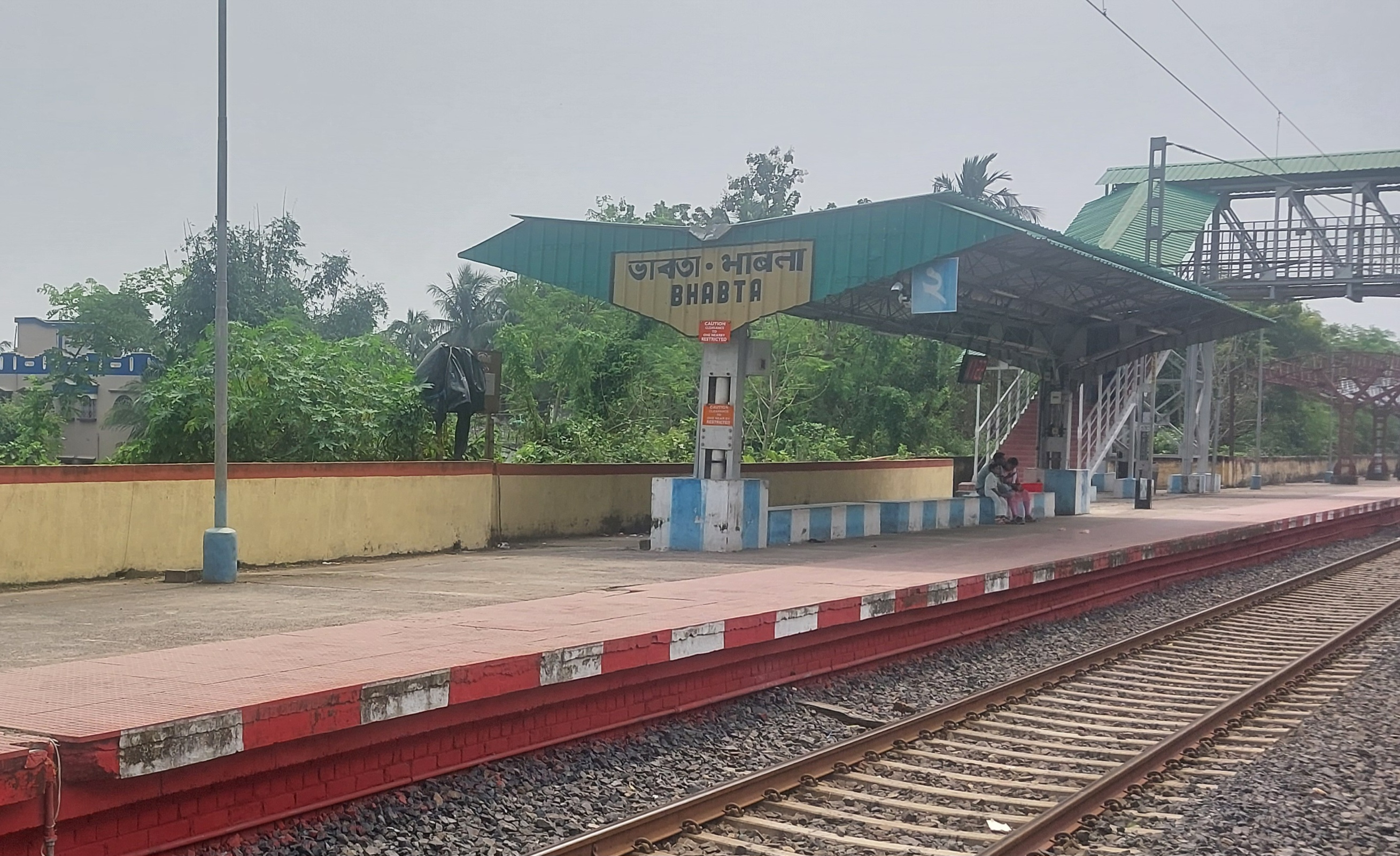
- Bhabta railway station

General information
- Location: Bhabta, Murshidabad district, West Bengal; India
- Coordinates: 23.986542°N 88.241647°E
- Elevation: 21 m (69 ft)
- System: Passenger train and Suburban train station
- Owner: Indian Railways
- Operator: Eastern Railway zone
- Line: Sealdah-Lalgola line
- Platforms: 2
- Tracks: 2

Construction
- Structure type: Standard (on ground station)
- Parking: No

Other information
- Status: Active
- Station code: BFT
- Zone(s): Eastern Railway zone
- Division(s): Sealdah

History
- Former names: East Indian Railway Company

Services
Preceding station	Kolkata Suburban Railway	Following station
Beldanga towards Krishnanagar City Junction	Eastern Line Krishnanagar–Lalgola line	Sargachi towards Lalgola
Route map
Location
- Location within West Bengal Location within India

Bhabta railway station is a railway station of the Sealdah-Lalgola line in the Eastern Railway zone of Indian Railways. The station is situated beside National Highway 12 at Bhabta village in Murshidabad district in the Indian state of West Bengal. It serves Bhabta and Beldanga I block areas. Total 14 trains including Lalogola Passengers and few EMUs stop in the station. The distance between Sealdah and Bhabta is 177 kilometres.

== Electrification ==
The Krishnanagar–Lalgola section, including Bhabta railway station was electrified in 2004. In 2010 the line became double tracked.
