= Debagram =

- Town
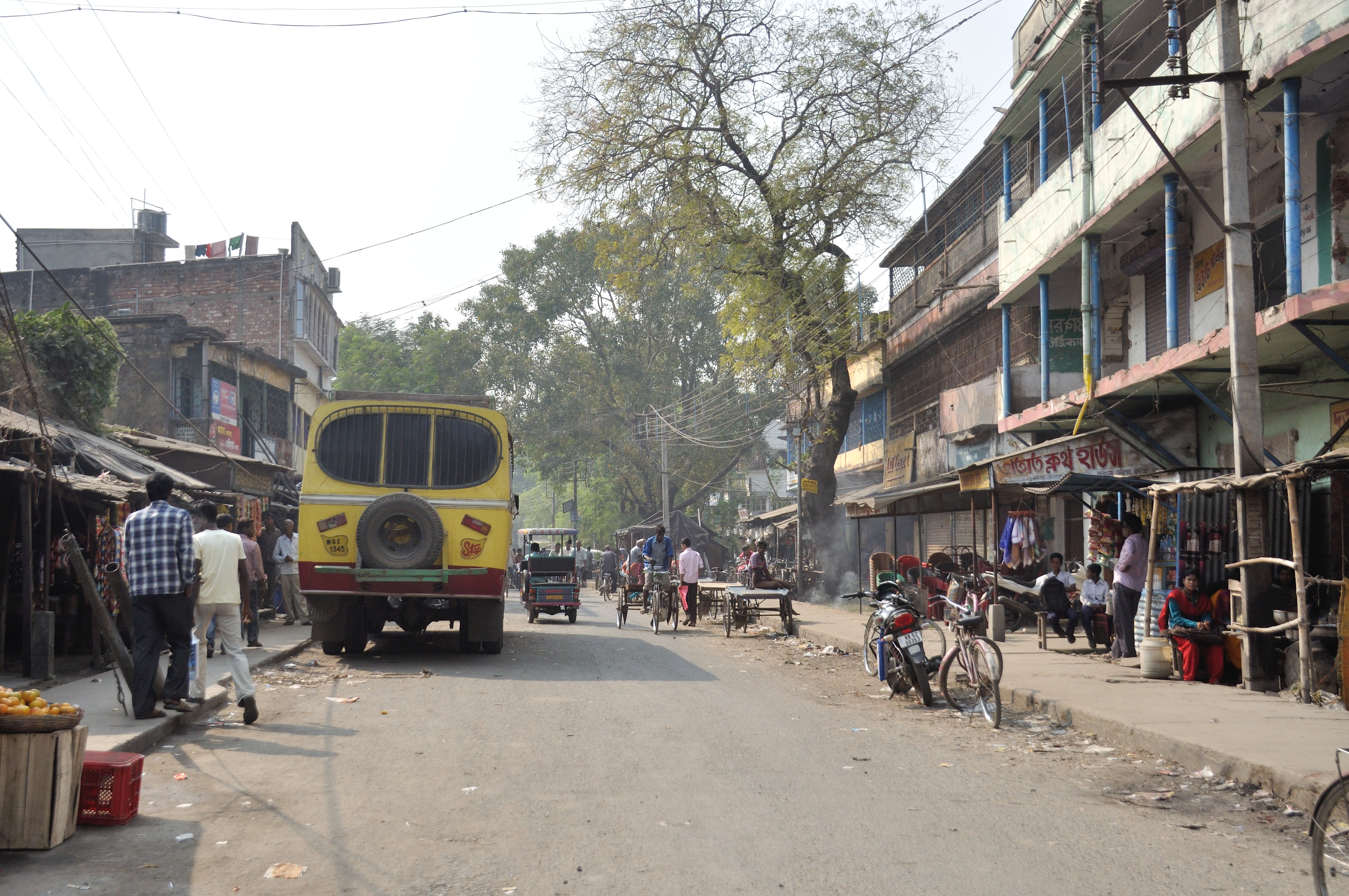
- Tehatta-Bhagirathi Ghat Road

- Location in West Bengal, India Debagram (India)
- Country: India
- State: West Bengal
- District: Nadia district
- Named after: Veda sastra

Government
  - Body: Debagram Gram Panchyat
- Elevation: 18 m (59 ft)

Population (2011)
  - Total: 32,697

Languages
  - Official: Bengali, English
- Time zone: UTC+5:30 (IST)
- PIN: 741137
- Telephone code: 03474
- ISO 3166 code: IN-WB
- Lok Sabha Constituency: Krishnanagar (Mahua Moitra)
- Vidhan Sabha Constituency: Kaliganj (Hasanujjaman Mandal)

Debagram is a town in the Kaliganj CD block in the Krishnanagar Sadar subdivision of the Nadia district in the Indian state of West Bengal.

== History ==
Before eighteenth century (A.D.) Debagram was surrounded by jungle. This place was inhabited by few people of Bagdi caste (Barga Kshatriya). In first part of eighteenth century a Brahmin family (surname- Majumder) migrated to Debagram from Uttar Pradesh. Few years later Gopal Bandopadhyay of Ichapore married a girl of Majumder family and started to live at Debagram. Gopal Bandopadhyay and his successor Janakinath Bandopadhyay were close of Nawabs of Murshidabad. After that quickly they extended their Zamindari and wealth. At the same time many other people, mainly Brahmins, from different areas came here and a prosperous village was formed. It is believed that some Brahmins studied Vedas there. Hence the village was named ‘Bedgram'. Many years later gradually this name became ‘Debagram’. Famous scholar and writer Biswanath Ponchanan lived here.Until British invasion this was an important place for Hindu ritualistic script writers.

== Geography ==
Cities and towns in Krishnanagr Sadar subdivision of Nadia district
M: municipal town/ city, CT: census town, R: rural/ urban centre, H: place of historical/ religious interest, T: place of tourist interest.
Owing to space constraints in the small map, the actual locations in a larger map may vary slightly

=== Location ===
Latitude: 23°41' north, Longitude: 88°18' east

Debagram is a part of deltaic alluvial plain of west Bengal formed by river Ganga and its tributaries and distributaries. It has an average elevation of 18 meters. This flat area is characterized by some ponds and low lands. The nearest river of the village is the Bhagirathi. It is about 9 km away from the village centre. Debagram is situated in the north west of Nadia District. Bethuadahari (12 km away), Plassey (12 km), Katwa (18 km) and Tehatta (24 km) is located respectively to the South, North, East and West of Debagram.

=== Area overview ===
Nadia district is mostly alluvial plains lying to the east of Hooghly River, locally known as Bhagirathi. The alluvial plains are cut across by such distributaries as Jalangi, Churni and Ichhamati. With these rivers getting silted up, floods are a recurring feature. The Krishnanagar Sadar subdivision, presented in the map alongside, has the Bhagirathi on the west, with Purba Bardhaman district lying across the river. The long stretch along the Bhagirathi has many swamps. The area between the Bhagirathi and the Jalangi, which flows through the middle of the subdivision, is known as Kalantar, a low-lying tract of black clay soil. A big part of the subdivision forms the Krishnanagar-Santipur Plain, which occupies the central part of the district. The Jalangi, after flowing through the middle of the subdivision, turns right and joins the Bhagirathi. On the south-east, the Churni separates the Krishnanagar-Santipur Plain from the Ranaghat-Chakdaha Plain. The east forms the boundary with Bangladesh. The subdivision is moderately urbanized. 20.795% of the population lives in urban areas and 79.205% lives in rural areas.

Note: The map alongside presents some of the notable locations in the subdivision. All places marked in the map are linked in the larger full screen map. All the four subdivisions are presented with maps on the same scale – the size of the maps vary as per the area of the subdivision.

=== Climate ===
According to the Köppen climate classification System Debagram has a Tropical Wet and Dry or Tropical Savanna type climate. It features a long and hot Summer followed by- wet and humid Monsoon, cloudless and pleasant Autumn, mild and dry Winter, sunny and warm Spring.

Month	Mean Temperature (°C)	Mean Maximum Temperature (°C)	Mean Minimum Temperature (°C)	Average Rainfall (mm)
January	18.9	26.3	11.6	13
February	21.4	29.0	13.9	14
March	26.7	34.5	18.9	22
April	30.6	37.8	23.4	36
May	30.5	36.1	25	80
June	30.2	34.5	26	268
July	29.0	32.3	25.8	313
August	29.1	32.3	25.9	268
September	29.2	32.7	25.7	213
October	27.7	32.2	23.2	105
November	23.3	29.6	17.1	15
December	19.7	26.8	12.7	3

== Demographics ==
According to the 2011 Census of India, Debagram had a total population of 32,695, of which 16,832 (51%) were males and 15,863 (49%) were females. Population in the age range 0–6 years was 3,837. The total number of literate persons in Debagram was 21,294 (73.79% of the population over 6 years).

== Civic administration ==
=== CD block HQ ===
The headquarters of Kaliganj CD block are located at Debagram.

=== Village administration ===
As per constitution of India and Panchyati Raaj Act, Debagram village is administrated by Sarpanch (Head of Village) who is elected representative of village. Debagram runs under the administrative area of Debagram Gram Panchayat, Kaliganj Panchyat Samity and Nadia Zilla Parishad. Debagram Gram Panchayat is composed of 28 members elected from different areas of Debagram. Examples of such areas are Satimaayer Vita, Netajee nagar, Shaktinagar (Chattagram Colony), Babupara, Siverdalan Para, Dakshin Para, Office Bagan Para, Paschim Para, Station Para, Ghosh Para, Vivekananda Para, Roy Para, Dutta Para, Power house Para, Meer Para, Danga Para, Chatterjee Para, Katwa More, Das Para, Debagram Chourasta, Panch matha More, Jampukur etc. Current Panchayat (2013 election) has 12 members of Communist Party of India (Marxist), 8 members of All India Trinamool Congress, 7 members of Bharatiya Janata Party and 1 member of Socialist Unity Centre of India (Communist).

== Economy ==
Agriculture is the backbone of economy at Debagram. Paddy and Jute are the principal crops grown at Debagram. Some other important crops are wheat, Potato, Sugarcane, Oilseed. During last decade remarkable progress has been seen in the production of Vegetables and Fruits. Now-a-days the occupational structure is changing rapidly. Modern era has encouraged the villagers to take up new occupation. These include cottage industry, Business (both wholesale and retail), Government Services, Educational Services, Private Sector Employment etc.

=== Banks ===
There are branches of 1. State Bank of India 2. Nadia District Central Cooperative Bank 3. Punjab National Bank 4. Bandhan Bank 5. Bangiya Gramin Vikash Bank

=== Work profile ===
In Debagram village out of total population, 10282 were engaged in work activities. 86.41% of workers describe their work as Main Work (Employment or Earning more than 6 Months) while 13.59% were involved in Marginal activity providing livelihood for less than 6 months. Of 10282 workers engaged in Main Work, 1252 were cultivators (owner or co-owner) while 2916 were Agricultural labourer.

== Transport ==
Debagram is connected to the rest of the country by Debagram railway station and NH-12. Buses operated by SBSTC, CSTC, NBSTC and many other private buses provide reliable means of road transportation. Long distance Buses connect Debagram to main cities of west Bengal, such as- Kolkata (145 km), Siliguri (432 km), Howrah(153 km), Coochbehar(559 km), Durgapur(175 km), Malda(179 km), Digha(316 km) . The other means of road transport in the village include Rickshaws, Totos, Vans, Cycles, bikes, cars etc.

Debagram comes under Eastern Railways of Indian Railway. Several trains pass through Debagram station and provide connection with many cities including Kolkata, Kalyani (91 km), Ranaghat (66 km), Krishnanagar (40 km), Baharampur (46 km). Other areas connected with state highway from Debagram to Tehatta, Kaliganj & Katwa.

Trains passing through Debagram

Up			Down		
Train No.	Departure Time	Train Route	Train No.	Departure Time	Train Route
53181	02:57	Sealdah-Lalgola	53172	00:28	Lalgola-Sealdah
63131	06:24	Krishnagar-Baharampur	53152	05:16	Lalgola-Ranaghat
53171	07:17	Sealdah-Lalgola	53174	06:27	Lalgola-Sealdah
53151	09:29	Ranaghat-Lalgola	|07:26	Lalgola-Sealdah	
53173	11:18	Sealdah-Lalgola	53176	08:57	Lalgola-Sealdah
53153	13:21	Ranaghat-Lalgola	63132	09:59	Baharampur-Krishnagar
63101 (Except Sunday)	14:24	Sealdah-Lalgola	53178	11:0	Lalgola-Sealdah
53175	15:53	Sealdah-Lalgola	63104	12:40	Lalgola-Sealdah
53179	17:08	Kolkata-Lalgola	53154	13:54	Lalgola-Ranaghat
53155	18:26	Ranaghat-Lalgola	53180	16:04	Lalgola-Kolkata
53177	19:41	Sealdah-Lalgola	53182	18:57	Lalgola-Sealdah
13103 (Express)	21:01	Sealdah-Lalgola	63102 (except Sunday)	19:53	Lalgola-Sealdah
63103	22:24	Sealdah-Lalgola	53156	20:28	Lalgola-Ranaghat
63105	23:08	Sealdah-Baharampur	63106	09:31	Baharampur-Sealdah

== Education ==
Debagram village has lower literacy rate compared to West Bengal. In 2011, literacy rate of Debagram village was 73.79% compared to 76.26% of West Bengal. In Debagram Male literacy stands at 76.27% while female literacy rate was 71.15%.

=== Colleges ===
- Kaliganj Government College (Estd. 2015)

=== Secondary and Higher Secondary Schools ===
- Debagram S.A. Vidyapith (Estd. 1949)
- Debagram D.K. Girls High School (Estd. 1952)
- Vivekananda Vidyabhaban High School (Estd. 1972)
- Dingel Madrasah Siksha Kendra (Estd. 1982)
- Jompukur Kalidas Bandopadhyay MSK (Estd. 2005)
- Jompukur Obaydul Memorial Girls Academy ( Estd. 2013)

=== Primary and Junior High Schools ===
- Gaharapota primary school (Estd. 1927)
- Debagram High Primary School (Estd. 1928)
- Dingel Primary School (Estd. 1932)
- Debagram Annapurna Primary School (Estd. 1943)
- Jompukur Primary School (Estd. 1954)
- Sibnagar Primary School (Estd. 1960)
- Chattagram Colony Primary School (Estd. 1962)
- Netaji Nagar Primary School (Estd. 1972)
- Kabi Rabindra Sishu Niketan (Estd. 1985)
- Khadijatul Kubra Girls Academy (Estd. 1995)
- Debagram Bagdipara SSK (Estd. 1999)
- Debagram Office Bagan Para SSK (Estd. 2000)
- Debagram Netaji Nagar SSK (Estd. 2000)
- Debagram Dangapara SSk (Estd. 2001)
- Office Bagan Para Saroj Nalini Das Primary School (Estd. 2001)
- Netaji Sishu Shiksha Niketan (Estd. 2003)
- Jompukur Firoza Begam Primary School (Estd. 2005)
- Sultan Smriti Jr. High Madrasah (Estd. 2006)
- Station Para CLS (Estd. 2008)
- Jompukur Hazi Abdul Odud Primary (Estd. 2008)
- Adarsha Sishu Shiksha Niketan (Debagram Ktwa More (Estd. 2011)
- Medows English School (Estd. 2014)
- Bond International School (Estd. 2015)
- New Dingel Primary School (Estd. 2018)

== Healthcare ==
There is a primary health centres at Debagram, with 10 beds.

== Debagram picture gallery ==
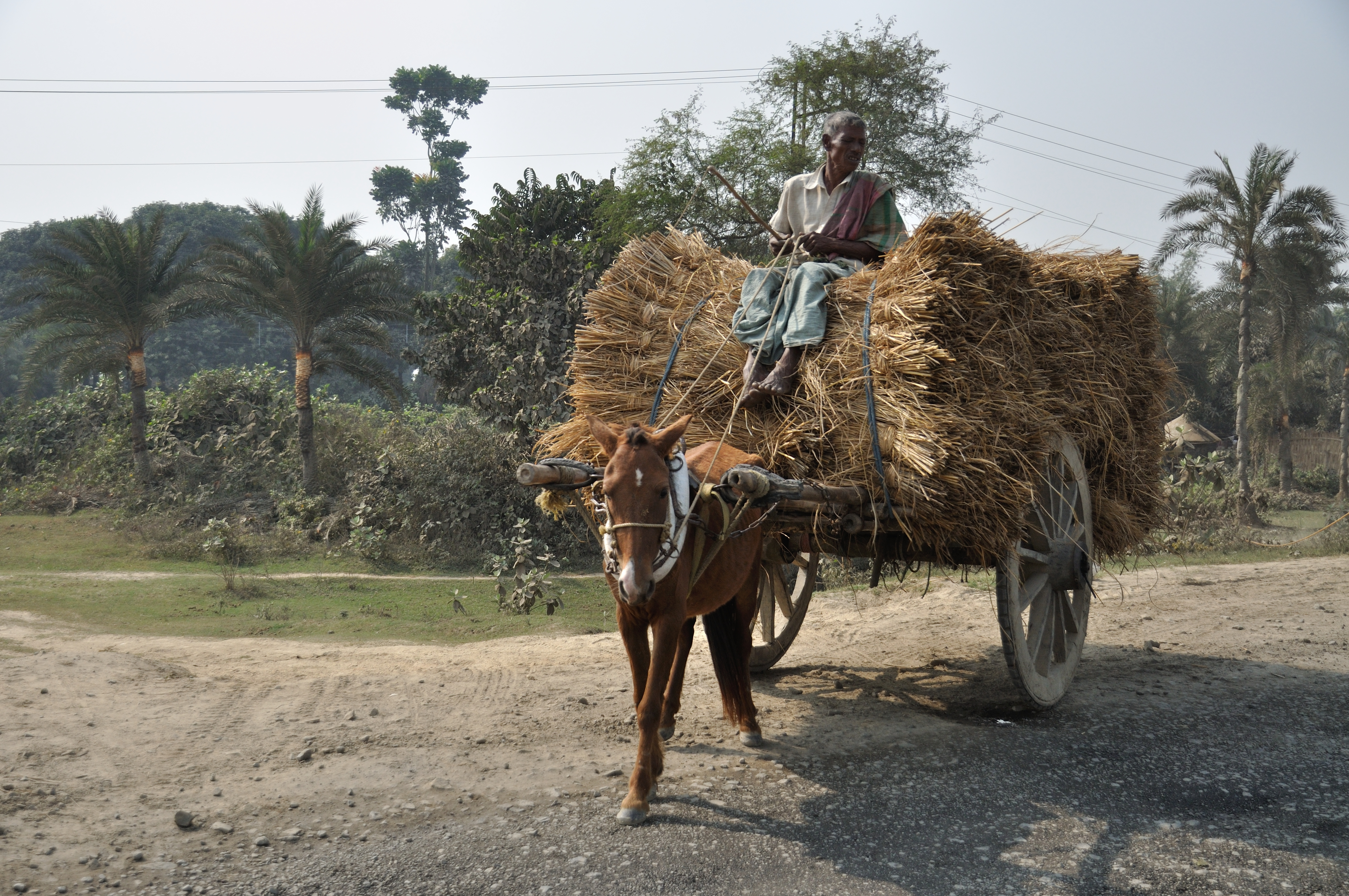
Homeward bound

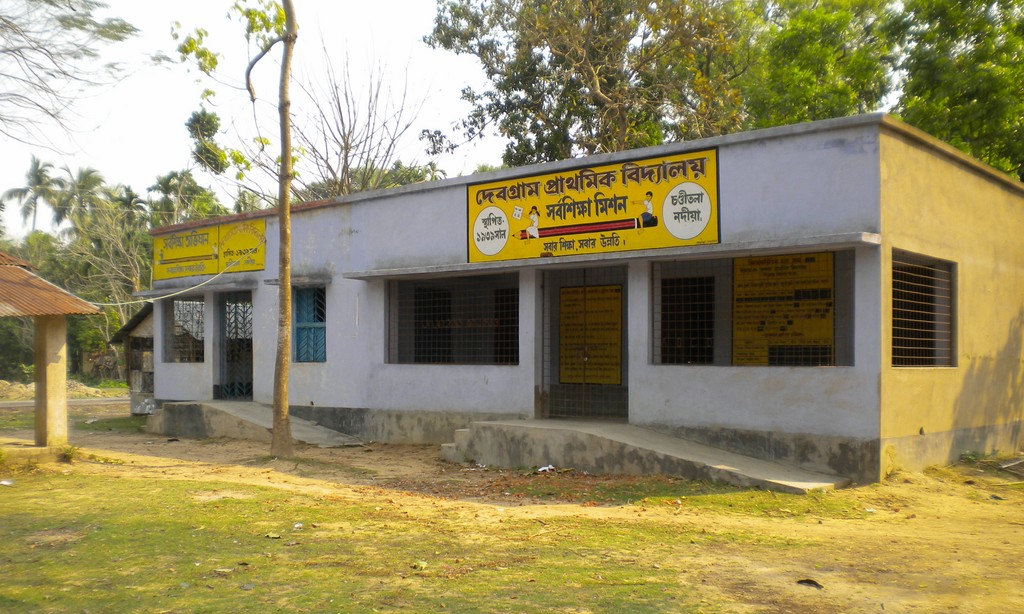
Debagram Primary School

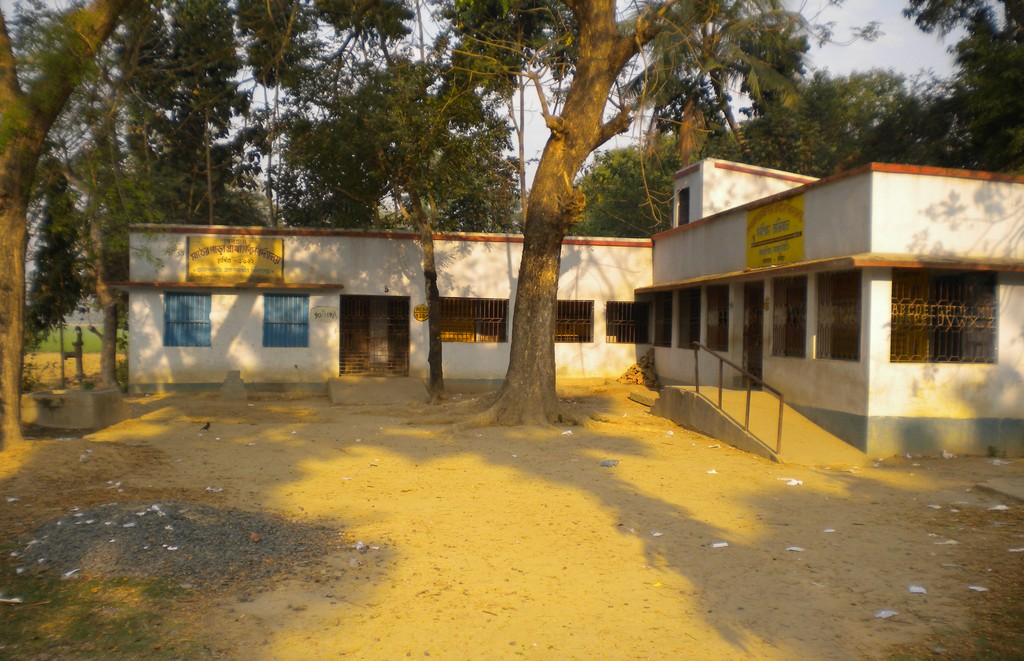
Matherpara Primary School

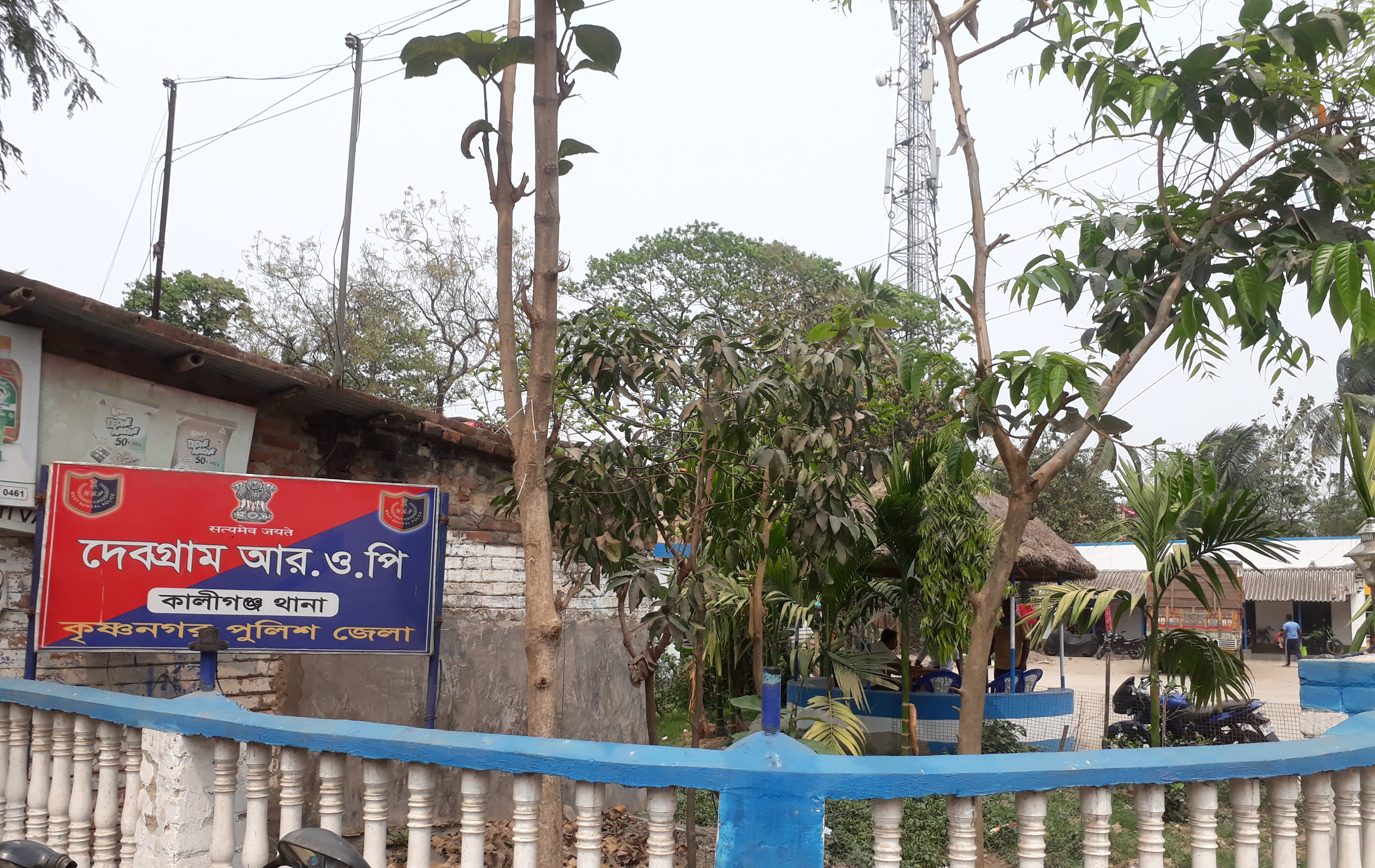
Debagram Police station

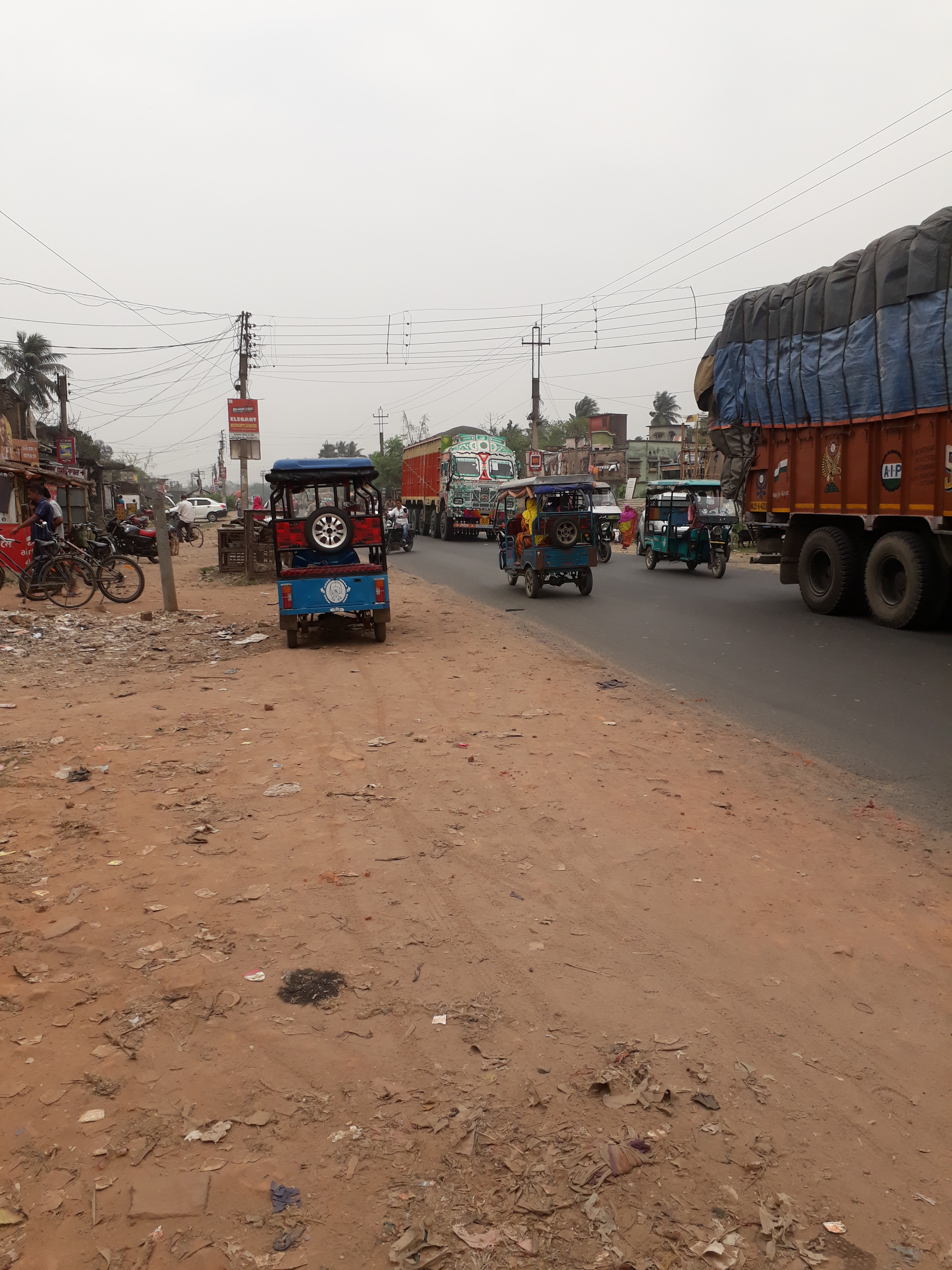
Debagram Bus stand

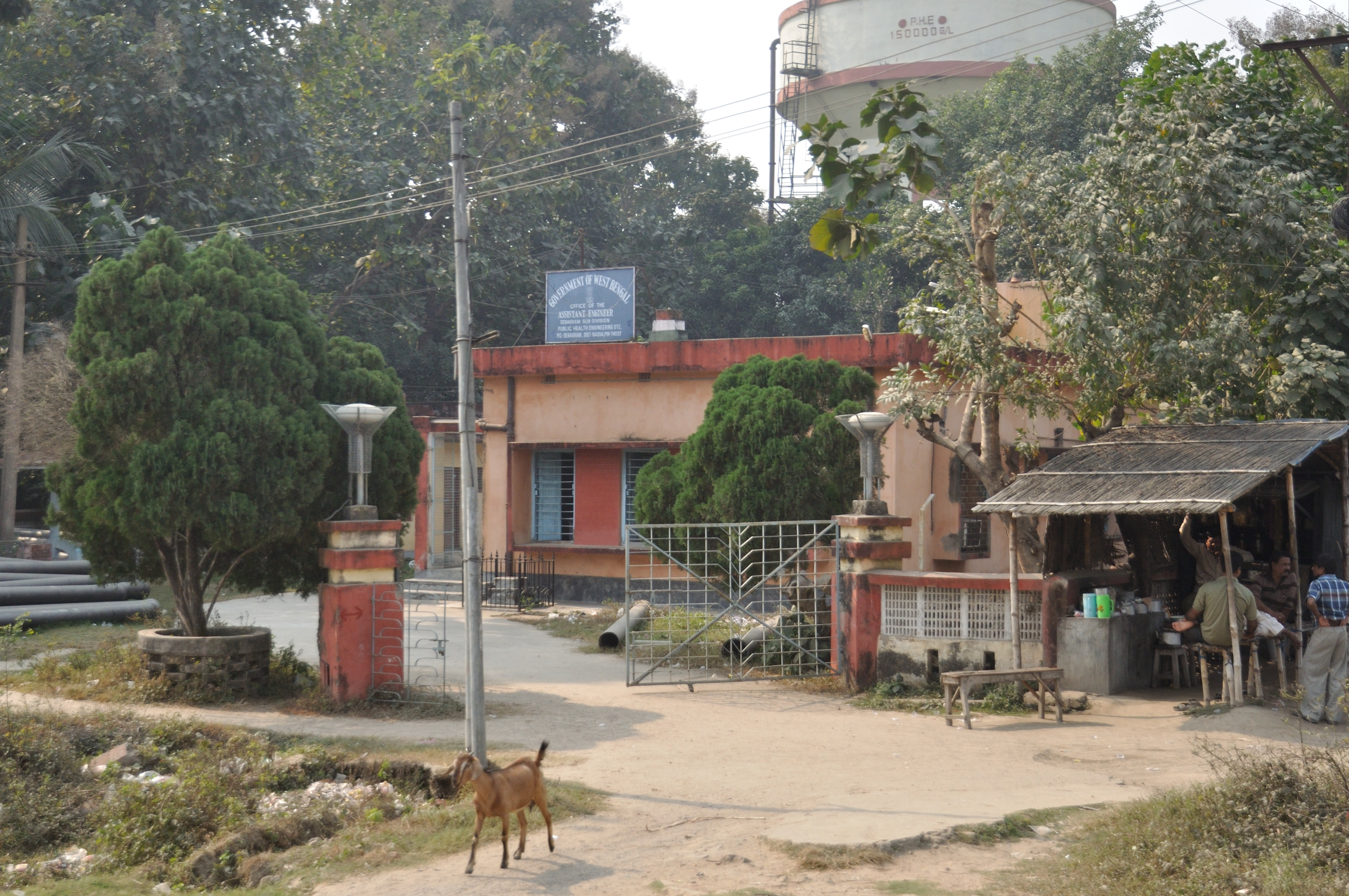
Public Health Engineering Office

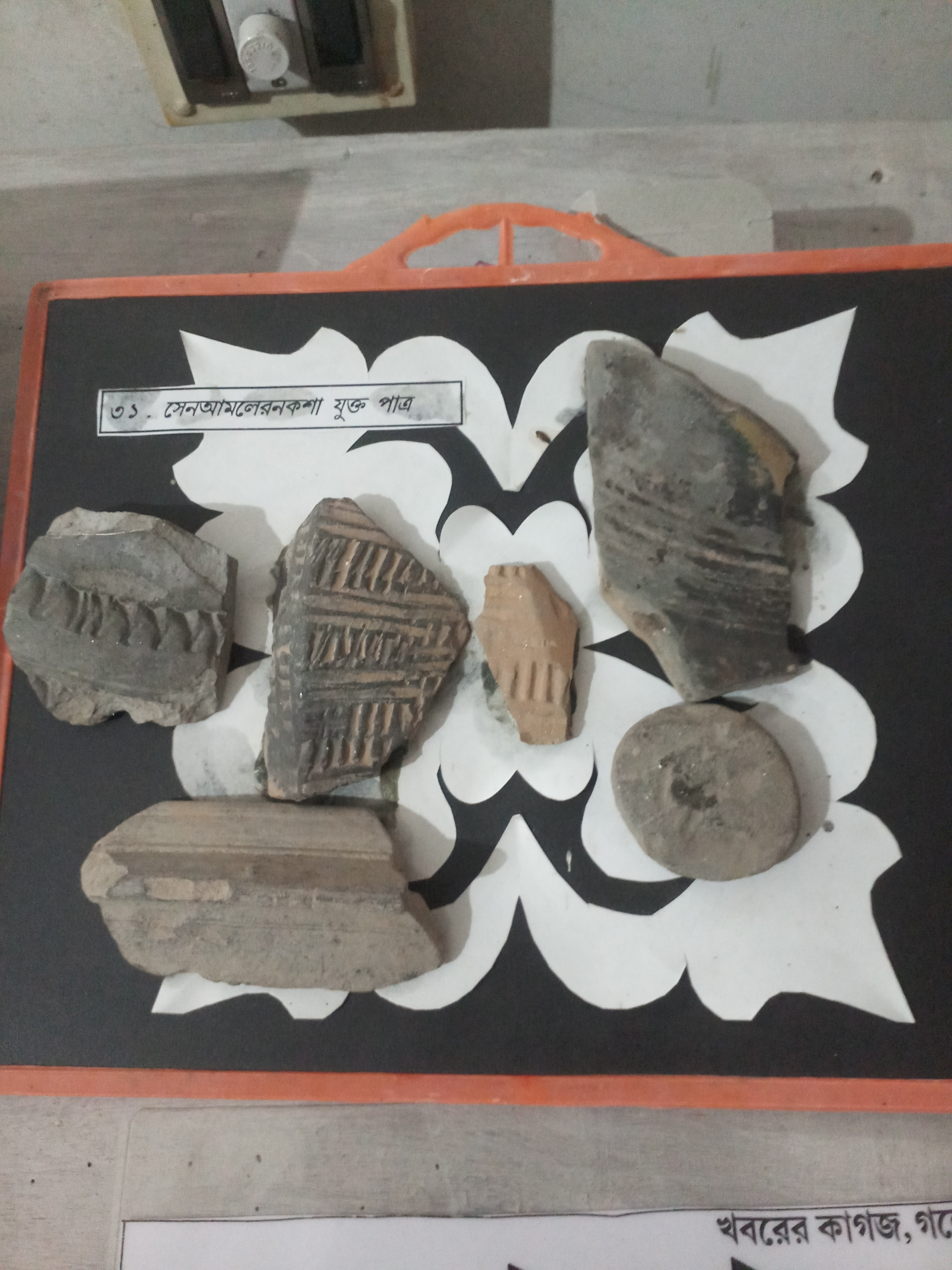
Debalgarh museum - some of the items belong to the Sena period
