= Beldanga Assembly constituency =

Beldanga
- Constituency No. 71 for the West Bengal Legislative Assembly
- Interactive Map Outlining Beldanga Assembly Constituency

Constituency details
- Country: India
- Region: East India
- State: West Bengal
- District: Murshidabad
- Lok Sabha constituency: Baharampur
- Established: 1951
- Total electors: 252,944
- Reservation: None

Member of Legislative Assembly
- 18th West Bengal Legislative Assembly
- Incumbent Bharat Kumar Jhawar
- Party: BJP
- Alliance: NDA
- Elected year: 2026
- Preceded by: Hasanuzzaman Sheikh

Beldanga Assembly constituency is an assembly constituency in Murshidabad district in the Indian state of West Bengal.

Most Successful Parties from Beldanga Assembly
1. Indian National Congress (9 times) (50.0%)
2. Revolutionary Communist Party of India (6 times) (33.4%)
3. Independent politician (1 time) (5.55%)
4. All India Trinamool Congress (1 time) (5.55%)
5. Bharatiya Janata Party (1 time) (5.55%)

== Overview ==
As per orders of the Delimitation Commission, No. 71 Beldanga Assembly constituency covers Beldanga municipality, Bhabta I, Bhabta II, Debkundu, Mirjapur II, Mahula I and Sujapur Kumarpur gram panchayats of Beldanga I community development block, and Bhakuri II, Haridasmati, Naoda Panur, Rajdharpara and Rangamati Chandpara gram panchayats of Berhampore community development block.

Beldanga Assembly constituency is part of No. 10 Baharampur Lok Sabha constituency.

== Members of the Legislative Assembly ==
Year	Member	Party
1951	Parimal Ghosh	Indian National Congress
1957	Parimal Ghosh	Indian National Congress
1962	Debsaran Ghosh	Revolutionary Socialist Party
1967	A. Latif	Indian National Congress
1969	Muhammed Khuda Bukhsh	Independent
1971	Timir Baran Bhaduri	Revolutionary Socialist Party
1972	Timir Baran Bhaduri	Revolutionary Socialist Party
1977	Timir Baran Bhaduri	Revolutionary Socialist Party
1982	Nurul Islam Choudhury	Indian National Congress
1987	Nurul Islam Choudhury	Indian National Congress
1991	Nurul Islam Choudhury	Indian National Congress
1996	Timir Baran Bhaduri	Revolutionary Socialist Party
2001	Golam Kibria Mia	Indian National Congress
2006	Mohammad Refatullah	Revolutionary Socialist Party
2011	Safiujjaman Seikh	Indian National Congress
2016	Safiujjaman Seikh	Indian National Congress
2021	Hasanuzzaman Sheikh	Trinamool Congress
2026	Bharat Kumar Jhawar	Bharatiya Janata Party

== Election results ==
=== 2026 ===
2026 West Bengal Legislative Assembly election: Beldanga
Party	Candidate	Votes	%	±%
BJP	Bharat Kumar Jhawar	72,872	31.88	▲3.02
AITC	Rabiul Alam Chowdhury	59,664	26.10	▼29.09
AJUP	Shoaib Ahmed	46,709	20.43	New entry
INC	Mohammad Saharuddin Seikh	39,962	17.48	▲4.3
SUCI(C)	Lockman Hakim	3,075	1.35	
RSP	Rajesh Ghosh	2,859	1.25	
NOTA	None of the above	1,779	0.78	▲0.11
Majority		13,208	5.78	▼20.55
Turnout		228,591	93.39	▲12.54
BJP gain from AITC		Swing		

=== 2021 ===
2021 West Bengal Legislative Assembly election: Beldanga
Party	Candidate	Votes	%	±%
AITC	Hasanuzzaman Sheikh	112,862	55.19	▲22.96
BJP	Sumit Ghosh	59,030	28.86	▲14.29
INC	Safiujjaman Sheikh	26,949	13.18	▼36.25
Independent	Kajal Ghosh Biswas	1,968	0.96	
NOTA	None of the above	1,368	0.67	
Majority		53,832	26.33	
Turnout		204,511	80.85	
AITC gain from INC		Swing		

=== 2016 ===
2016 West Bengal Legislative Assembly election: Beldanga
Party	Candidate	Votes	%	±%
INC	Safiujjaman Seikh	87,017	49.43	▲4.11
AITC	Golam Kibria Mia	56,736	32.23	New entry
BJP	Alok Ghosh	25,651	14.57	▲3.03
IUML	Ittefa Hossain	2,865	1.63	▼4.17
NOTA	None of the above	2,229	1.27	New entry
SP	Marjina Khatun	1,552	0.88	New entry
Majority		30,281	17.20	▲7.93
Turnout		1,76,050	80.20	▼1.87
INC hold		Swing		

=== 2011 ===
2011 West Bengal Legislative Assembly election: Beldanga
Party	Candidate	Votes	%	±%
INC	Safiujjaman Seikh	67,888	45.32	
RSP	Mohammad Refatullah	54,005	36.05	
BJP	Alok Ghosh	17,282	11.54	
IUML	Abul Hossain	8,693	5.80	
JD(U)	Masah Gulashunnaher Banu	1,943	1.30	
Majority		13,883	9.27	
Turnout		1,49,811	82.07	
INC gain from RSP		Swing		

=== 2006 ===
In the 2006 state assembly elections Md. Refatullah of RSP won the Beldanga assembly seat defeating his nearest rival Golam Kibria Mia of Congress. Contests in most years were multi cornered but only winners and runners are being mentioned. Golam Kibria Mia of Congress defeated Timir Baran Bhaduri of RSP in 2001. Timir Baran Bhaduri of RSP defeated Nurul Islam Choudhury of Congress in 1996. Nurul Islam Choudhury of Congress defeated Sk. Nowshad Ali of RSP in 1991 and 1987, and Timir Baran Bhaduri of RSP in 1982. Timir Baran Bhaduri of RSP defeated Nurul Islam Choudhury of Congress in 1977.

=== 1951 ===
1951 West Bengal Legislative Assembly election: Beldanga
Party	Candidate	Votes	%	±%
INC	Kshitish Chandra Ghose	9,523	32.46	
HM	Jnanendra Nath Lahiri	8,227	28.04	
IND	Torabuddin	5,713	19.47	
IND	Bamondas Mondal	3,216	10.96	
CPI	Fayajuddin Sheikh	2,658	9.06	
Majority		1,296	4.42	
Turnout		29,337	54.65	
INC win (new seat)				
