= Muhammed Khuda Bukhsh =

Indian politician (1913–1975)

Member of the West Bengal Legislative Assembly
- In office 1969–1971
- Constituency: Beldanga

Member of Parliament, Lok Sabha
- In office 1952–1962
- Succeeded by: Syed Badrudduja
- Constituency: Murshidabad, West Bengal

Personal details
- Born: 18 July 1913 Barua Beldanga, Murshidabad, Bengal Presidency, British India
- Party: Independent
- Other political affiliations: Indian National Congress

Muhammed Khuda Bukhsh (18 July 1913 – 24 July 1975) was an Indian politician. He was elected to the Lok Sabha, lower house of the Parliament of India from Murshidabad in West Bengal. He also became an MLA from Beldanga.

Bukhsh died on 24 July 1975, at the age of 62.
