= Kaliganj (community development block) =

- Community development block
- Coordinates: 23.73°N 88.23°E
- Country: India
- State: West Bengal
- District: Nadia

Government
  - Type: Community development block

Area
  - Total: 320.02 km^{2} (123.56 sq mi)
- Elevation: 17 m (56 ft)

Population (2011)
  - Total: 334,881
  - Density: 1,046.4/km^{2} (2,710.3/sq mi)

Languages
  - Official: Bengali, English

Literacy (2011)
  - Total literates: 193,975 (65.89%)
- Time zone: UTC+5:30 (IST)
- PIN: 741150 (Kaliganj); 741137 (Debagram); 741153 (Matiari)
- Telephone/STD code: 03473
- Vehicle registration: WB-51, WB-52
- Lok Sabha constituency: Krishnanagar
- Vidhan Sabha constituency: Kaliganj, Nakashipara
- Website: nadia.nic.in

Kaliganj is a community development block that forms an administrative division in Krishnanagar Sadar subdivision of Nadia district in the Indian state of West Bengal.

== History ==
The Battle of Plassey was fought at Palashi in this block on 23 June 1757 between Siraj ud-Daulah, the last independent ruler of Bengal and the forces of the British East India Company under Lord Clive. The victory of the British forces in the battle marked the advent of British rule in Bengal, which over the next century expanded to cover most of India. There is a memorial stone, set up in 1883, that marks the victory of the British.

== Geography ==
Kaliganj is located at 23°44′N 88°14′E.

Kaliganj CD Block is bounded by Beldanga II CD Block, in Murshidabad district, in the north, Tehatta II and Nakashipara CD Blocks in the east, Katwa II CD Block, in Bardhaman district across the Bhagirathi, in the south and Katwa I and Ketugram II CD Blocks, in Bardhaman district across the Bhagirathi, in the west.

Nadia district is mostly alluvial plains lying to the east of Hooghly River, locally known as the Bhagirathi. The alluvial plains are cut across by such distributaries as the Jalangi, Churni and Ichhamati. With these rivers getting silted up, floods are a recurring feature.

Kaliganj CD Block has an area of 320.02 km^{2}. It has 1 panchayat samity, 15 gram panchayats, 241 gram sansads (village councils), 127 mouzas and 105 inhabited villages. Kaliganj police station serves this block. Headquarters of this CD Block is at Debagram.

Gram panchayats of Kaliganj block/ panchayat samiti are Barachandghar, Debagram, Faridpur, Gobra, Hatgachha, Juranpur, Kaliganj, Matiary, Mira I, Mira II, Palitbegia, Panighata, Plassey I, Plassey II and R Ghoraikhetra.

== Demographics ==
=== Population ===
As per the 2011 Census of India, Kaliganj CD Block had a total population of 334,881, of which 306,197 were rural and 28,684 were urban. There were 171,912 (51%) males and 162,569 (49%) females. The population below 6 years old was 47,473. Scheduled Castes numbered 50,979 (15.22%) and Scheduled Tribes numbered 1,642 (0.49%).

As per the 2001 census, Kaliganj block had a total population of 290,845, out of which 149,750 were males and 141,095 were females. Kaliganj block registered a population growth of 21.82% during the 1991-2001 decade. Decadal growth for the district was 19.51%. Decadal growth in West Bengal was 17.84%.

There are two census towns in Kaliganj CD Block (2011 census figures in brackets): Mira (14,391) and Matiari (14,293).

Large villages (with 4,000+ population) in Kaliganj CD Block are (2011 census figures in brackets): Palashi (19,984), Uttar Hajratpota (8,180), Erardanga (4,001), Bara Kulberia (6,662), Kaliganj (8,575), Gabindapur (6,756), Jamalpur (8,900), Sajapur (5,064), Radhakantapur (6,550), Panighata (4,951), Kamari (4,050), Juranpur (6,165), Gobra (4,221), Bashar Khola (4,419), Debagram (32,695), Rautara (5,642), Bara Atagi (4,571), Ballabhpara (4,997), Molamdi (8,397), Bara Chandghar (16,713) and Chhota Chandghar (8,761).

Other villages in Kaliganj CD Block include (2011 census figures in brackets): Faridpur (1,747), Ghorai Khetra (2,941), Palit Bege (2,436) and Hatgachha (3,818).

=== Literacy ===
As per the 2011 census, the total number of literates in Kaliganj CD Block was 193,975 (66.11% of the population over 6 years) out of which males numbered 104,124 (69.04% of the male population over 6 years) and females numbered 89,851 (63.02% of the female population over 6 years). The gender disparity (the difference between female and male literacy rates) was 6.02%.

See also – List of West Bengal districts ranked by literacy rate

Literacy in CD blocks of
Nadia district
Tehatta subdivision
Karimpur I – 67.70%
Karimpur II – 62.04%
Tehatta I – 70.72%
Tehatta II – 68.52%
Krishnanagar Sadar subdivision
Kaliganj – 65.89%
Nakashipara – 64.86%
Chapra – 68.25%
Krishnanagar I – 71.45%
Krishnanagar II – 68.52%
Nabadwip – 67.72%
Krishnaganj – 72.86%
Ranaghat subdivision
Hanskhali – 80.11%
Santipur – 73.10%
Ranaghat I – 77.61%
Ranaghat II – 79.38%
Kalyani subdivision
Chakdaha – 64.17%
Haringhata – 82.15%
Source: 2011 Census: CD Block Wise
Primary Census Abstract Data

=== Language and religion ===
Religion in Kaliganj CD block (2011)
Islam	58.51%
Hinduism	41.36%
Other or not stated	0.13%

In the 2011 census, Muslims numbered 195,935 and formed 58.51% of the population in Kaliganj CD Block. Hindus numbered 138,509 and formed 41.36% of the population. Christians numbered 128 and formed 0.04% of the population. Others numbered 309 and formed 0.09% of the population.

In the 2001 census, Muslims numbered 161,705 and formed 55.59% of the population of Kaliganj CD Block. Hindus numbered 128,747 and formed 44.25% of the population. In the 1991 census, Muslims numbered 124,226 and formed 52.03% of the population of Kaliganj CD Block. Hindus numbered 114,507 and formed 47.96% of the population.

Bengali is the predominant language, spoken by 99.69% of the population.

== Rural poverty ==
The District Human Development Report for Nadia has provided a CD Block-wise data table for Modified Human Vulnerability Index of the district. Kaliganj CD Block registered 36.35 on the MHPI scale. The CD Block-wise mean MHVI was estimated at 33.92. A total of 8 out of the 17 CD Blocks in Nadia district were found to be severely deprived when measured against the CD Block mean MHVI - Karimpur I and Karimpur II (under Tehatta subdivision), Kaliganj, Nakashipara, Chapra, Krishnanagar I and Nabadwip (under Krishnanagar Sadar subdivision) and Santipur (under Ranaghat subdivision) appear to be backward.

As per the Human Development Report 2004 for West Bengal, the rural poverty ratio in Nadia district was 28.35%. The estimate was based on Central Sample data of NSS 55th round 1999–2000.

== Economy ==
=== Livelihood ===
In Kaliganj CD Block in 2011, amongst the class of total workers, cultivators formed 20.98%, agricultural labourers 47.44%, household industry workers 3.71% and other workers 27.87%.

The southern part of Nadia district starting from Krishnanagar I down to Chakdaha and Haringhata has some urban pockets specialising in either manufacturing or service related economic activity and has reflected a comparatively higher concentration of population but the urban population has generally stagnated. Nadia district still has a large chunk of people living in the rural areas.

=== Infrastructure ===
There are 105 inhabited villages in Kaliganj CD Block. 100% villages have power supply and 103 villages (98.10%) had drinking water supply. 29 Villages (27.62%) have post offices. 83 villages (79.05%) have telephones (including landlines, public call offices and mobile phones). 57 villages (54.29%) have a pucca approach road and 51 villages (48.70%) have transport communication (includes bus service, rail facility, and navigable waterways). Five villages (4.76%) have agricultural credit societies and 12 villages (11.43%) have banks. Although 100% villages in Nadia district had power supply in 2011, a survey in 2007-08 revealed that less than 50% of households had electricity connection. In rural areas of the country, the tube well was for many years considered to be the provider of safe drinking water, but with arsenic contamination of ground water claiming public attention it is no longer so. Piped water supply is still a distant dream. In 2007–08, the availability of piped drinking water in Nadia district was as low as 8.6%, well below the state average of around 20%.

=== Agriculture ===
Persons engaged in agriculture
in Kaliganj CD Block
1. Bargadars (6.23%)
2. Patta holders (8.49%)
3. Small farmers (7.71%)
4. Marginal farmers (29.8%)
5. Agricultural labourers (47.8%)

Although the Bargadari Act of 1950 recognised the rights of bargadars to a higher share of crops from the land that they tilled, it was not implemented fully. Large tracts, beyond the prescribed limit of land ceiling, remained with the rich landlords. From 1977 onwards major land reforms took place in West Bengal. Land in excess of land ceiling was acquired and distributed amongst the peasants. Following land reforms land ownership pattern has undergone transformation. In 2013–14, persons engaged in agriculture in Kaliganj CD Block could be classified as follows: bargadars 6.23%, patta (document) holders 8.49%, small farmers (possessing land between 1 and 2 hectares) 7.71%, marginal farmers (possessing land up to 1 hectare) 29.78% and agricultural labourers 47.79%. As the proportion of agricultural labourers is very high, the real wage in the agricultural sector has been a matter of concern.

Kaliganj CD Block had 178 fertiliser depots, 25 seed stores and 72 fair price shops in 2013–14.

In 2013–14, Kaliganj CD Block produced 25,125 tonnes of Aman paddy, the main winter crop from 9,361 hectares, 32,211 tonnes of Boro paddy (spring crop) from 8,013 hectares, 12,497 tonnes of Aus paddy (summer crop) from 4,787 hectares, 11,028 tonnes of wheat from 2,923 hectares, 152,125 tonnes of jute from 8,428 hectares, 7,731 tonnes of potatoes from 251 hectares and 178,831 tonnes of sugar cane from 1,784 hectares. It also produced pulses and oilseeds.

In 2013–14, the total area irrigated in Kaliganj CD Block was 1,446 hectares, out of which 1,004 hectares were irrigated by river lift irrigation and 442 hectares by deep tube wells.

=== Pith helmets ===
Since time immemorial Kaliganj was most popular in respect of manufacturing shola hats which was being widely used by government officials, specially the police personnel. With the advent of other varieties of hats which also gained the approval for the use by the government officials the industry was closed.

=== Banking ===
In 2013–14, Kaliganj CD Block had offices of 7 commercial banks and 6 gramin banks.

== Transport ==
Kaliganj CD Block has 4 originating/ terminating bus routes.

The Ranaghat-Lalgola branch line was opened in 1905. It passes through this CD Block and there are stations at Plassey, Pagla Chandi and Debagram railway station.

NH 12 (old number NH 34) passes through this block.

== Education ==
In 2013–14, Kaliganj CD Block had 95 primary schools with 6,626 students, 6 middle schools with 866 students, 4 high school with 2,081 students and 13 higher secondary schools with 16,052 students. Kaliganj CD Block had 1 general college with 4,120 students and 300 institutions for special and non-formal education with 7,486 students

In Kaliganj CD Block, amongst the 105 inhabited villages, 10 had no school, 54 had more than 1 primary school, 56 had at least 1 primary school, 39 had at least 1 primary and 1 middle school and 18 had at least 1 middle and 1 secondary school.

== Healthcare ==
In 2014, Kaliganj CD Block had 1 rural hospital, 5 primary health centres and 3 private nursing homes with total 120 beds and 10 doctors (excluding private bodies). It had 38 family welfare subcentres. 5,415 patients were treated indoor and 396,495 patients were treated outdoor in the hospitals, health centres and subcentres of the CD Block.

Kaliganj Rural Hospital, with 25 beds at Juranpur, is the major government medical facility in the Kaliganj CD block. There are primary health centres at Debagram (with 10 beds), Juranpur (with 10 beds), Matiari (with 6 beds), Mira (with 10 beds) and Panighata (with 20 beds).

Kaliganj CD Block is one of the areas of Nadia district where groundwater is affected by high level of arsenic contamination. The WHO guideline for arsenic in drinking water is 10 mg/ litre, and the Indian Standard value is 50 mg/ litre. All the 17 blocks of Nadia district have arsenic contamination above this level. The maximum concentration in Kaliganj CD Block is 1,000 mg/litre.
