= Kaliganj Assembly constituency =

Kaliganj
- Constituency No. 80 for the West Bengal Legislative Assembly
- Interactive Map Outlining Kaliganj Assembly Constituency

Constituency details
- Country: India
- Region: East India
- State: West Bengal
- District: Nadia
- Lok Sabha constituency: Krishnanagar
- Established: 1951
- Total electors: 248,358
- Reservation: None

Member of Legislative Assembly
- 18th West Bengal Legislative Assembly
- Incumbent Alifa Ahmed
- Party: DTC
- Elected year: 2026

Kaliganj Assembly constituency is an assembly constituency in Nadia district in the Indian state of West Bengal.

== Overview ==
As per orders of the Delimitation Commission, No. 80 Kaliganj Assembly constituency is composed of the following: Bara Chandghar. Debagram, Faridpur, Gobra, Hatgachha, Juranpur, Kaliganj, Matiari, Mira I, Mira II, Panighata, Plassey I and Plassey II gram panchayats of Kaliganj community development block.

Kaliganj Assembly constituency is part of No. 12 Krishnanagar (Lok Sabha constituency).

== Members of the Legislative Assembly ==
Year	Member	Party Affiliation
1951	S. M. Fazlur Rahman	Indian National Congress
1957	Mahananda Haldar	Indian National Congress
1962	S. M. Fazlur Rahman	Indian National Congress
1967	S. M. Fazlur Rahman	Indian National Congress
1969	S. M. Fazlur Rahman	Indian National Congress
1971	Mir Fakir Mohammed	Independent
1972	Shib Sankar Bandopdhyay	Indian National Congress
1977	Debsaran Ghosh	Revolutionary Socialist Party
1982	Debsaran Ghosh	Revolutionary Socialist Party
1987	Abdus Salam Munshi	Indian National Congress
1991	Abdus Salam Munshi	Indian National Congress
1996	Abdus Salam Munshi	Indian National Congress
2001	Dhananjoy Modak	Revolutionary Socialist Party
2006	Dhananjoy Modak	Revolutionary Socialist Party
2011	Nasiruddin Ahamed	Trinamool Congress
2016	Hasanuzzaman Sheikh	Indian National Congress
2021	Nasiruddin Ahamed	Trinamool Congress
2025^	Alifa Ahmed	Trinamool Congress
2026	Alifa Ahmed	Trinamool Congress

- ^ denotes by-election

== Election results ==
Vote share of Winning candidates
2026	40.77%
2025 (by-poll)	55.15%
2021	53.35%
2016	45.65%
2011	47.33%
2006	43.26%
2001	36.69%
1996	42.67%
1991	37.13%
1987	47.74%
1982	38.17%
1977	41.16%
1972	41.16%
1971	26.94%
1969	51.81%
1967	53.15%
1962	39.06%
1957 (Seat-1)	39.86%
1957 (Seat-2)	38.64%
1951	58.08%

=== 2026 ===
2026 West Bengal Legislative Assembly election: Kaliganj
Party	Candidate	Votes	%	±%
AITC	Alifa Ahmed	89,292	40.77	▼12.58
BJP	Bapan Ghosh	79,120	36.12	▲5.21
CPI(M)	Sabina Iyasmin Sekh	22,806	10.41	New entry
AJUP	Kechhabuddin Sekh	16,222	7.41	New entry
INC	Kabil Uddin Shaikh	4,267	1.95	▼10.03
NOTA	None of the above	2,105	0.96	▼0.02
Majority		10,172	4.65	▼17.79
Turnout		219,023	93.76	▲9.45
AITC hold		Swing		

=== 2025 by-election ===
2025 West Bengal Legislative Assembly by-election: Kaliganj
Party	Candidate	Votes	%	±%
AITC	Alifa Ahmed	102,759	55.15	▲1.80
BJP	Ashish Ghosh	52,710	28.29	▼2.62
INC	Kabil Uddin Shaikh	28,348	15.21	▲3.23
NOTA	None of the above	1,502	1.34	▲0.36
Majority		50,049	26.84	▲4.4
Turnout		1,86,319	73.39	▼10.95
AITC hold		Swing		

=== 2021 ===
West Bengal assembly elections, 2021: Kaliganj constituency
Party	Candidate	Votes	%	±%
AITC	Nasiruddin Ahamed	111,696	53.35	
BJP	Abhijit Ghosh	64,709	30.91	
INC	Abul Kashem	25,076	11.98	
NOTA	None of the above	2,051	0.98	
Majority		46,987	22.44	
Turnout		209,379	84.31	
AITC gain from INC		Swing		

=== 2016 ===
2016 West Bengal Legislative Assembly election: Kaliganj
Party	Candidate	Votes	%	±%
INC	Hasanuzzaman Sk	85,125	45.65	
AITC	Ahamed Nasiruddin (Lal)	83,898	44.99	
BJP	Saikat Sarkar	10,373	5.56	
NOTA	None of the Above	2,349	1.26	
SUCI(C)	Harroj Ali Shaikh	1,119	0.60	
SS	Biplab Roy	1,075	0.58	
CPI(ML)L	Altaf Hossain Sekh	946	0.51	
BSP	Sunil Mandal	890	0.48	
SP	Swapan Modak	711	0.38	
Majority		1,227	0.66	
Turnout		186,486	85.93	
INC gain from AITC		Swing		

=== 2011 ===
2011 West Bengal Legislative Assembly election: Kaliganj
Party	Candidate	Votes	%	±%
AITC	Nasiruddin Ahamed (Lal)	74,091	47.33	
RSP	Sankar Sarkar	56,913	36.35	
BJP	Mahadeb Ghosh	13,319	8.51	
IND	Sharifuddin Munshi (Note: Sharifuddin Munshi, contesting as an independent candidate, was a rebel Congress candidate.)	6,863	4.38	
IUML	Sekh. Akher Ali	1,327	0.85	
BSP	Sunil Chandra Mondal	1,259	0.80	
CPI(ML)L	Altaf Hossain Sk	1,159	0.74	
IND	Iman Mandal	1,073	0.69	
JD(U)	Nekchaddin Sk.	547	0.35	
Majority		17,178	10.98	
Turnout		156,551	84.04	
AITC gain from RSP		Swing		

=== 2006 ===
2006 West Bengal Legislative Assembly election: Kaliganj
Party	Candidate	Votes	%	±%
RSP	Dhananjoy Modak	57,006	43.26	
AITC	Nasiruddin Ahmed	53,245	40.41	
INC	Abdus Salam Munshi	12,117	9.20	
IND	Sk. Khoda Box	6,410	4.86	
SP	Habibur Rahaman	2,984	2.26	
Majority		3,761	2.85	
Turnout		131,762		
RSP hold		Swing		

=== 2001 ===
2001 West Bengal Legislative Assembly election: Kaliganj
Party	Candidate	Votes	%	±%
RSP	Dhananjoy Modak	44,328	36.69	
AITC	Abdus Salam Munshi	31,806	26.33	
BJP	Urmibala Mookherjee	30,696	25.41	
IUML	Jafarulla Molla	6,619	5.48	
IND	Harroj Ali Shaikh	3,467	2.87	
CPI(ML)L	Krishna Pramanik	2,146	1.78	
IND	Mir Fakir Mohammad	1,751	1.45	
Majority		12,522	10.36	
Turnout		120,870	74.89	
RSP gain from INC		Swing		

=== 1996 ===
1996 West Bengal Legislative Assembly election: Kaliganj
Party	Candidate	Votes	%	±%
INC	Abdus Salam Munshi	50,665	42.67	
RSP	Dhananjoy Modak	49,291	41.51	
BJP	Subal Chandra Sarkar	13,026	10.97	
CPI(ML)L	Altaf Hossain Shaikh	1,778	1.50	
IUML	Sekh Rahamatulla	988	0.83	
IND	Harroj Ali Shaikh	969	0.82	
SS	Adhir Kumar Biswas	858	0.72	
INL	Molla Jafrulla	522	0.44	
BSP	Khan Mozibor Rahaman	333	0.28	
AIIC(T)	Amal Mazumder	188	0.16	
SAP	Siraj Mondal	126	0.11	
Majority		1,374	1.16	
Turnout		123,664	79.31	
INC hold		Swing		

=== 1991 ===
1991 West Bengal Legislative Assembly election: Kaliganj
Party	Candidate	Votes	%	±%
INC	Abdus Salam Munshi	39,245	37.13	
RSP	Ghosh Deb Saran	35,467	33.56	
BJP	Subal Chandra Sarkar	25,527	24.15	
IPF	Krishna Pada Pramanik	2,158	2.04	
IND	Harrot Ali Shaikh	1,757	1.66	
JP	Mandal Noor Hossain	837	0.79	
IND	Molla Habibur Rahaman	354	0.33	
HM	Sankar Kumar Dutta	342	0.32	
Majority		3,778	3.57	
Turnout		109,636	79.78	
INC hold		Swing		

=== 1987 ===
1987 West Bengal Legislative Assembly election: Kaliganj
Party	Candidate	Votes	%	±%
INC	S. M. Fazlur Rahaman	43,948	47.74	
RSP	Ghosh Debsaran	43,030	46.75	
IND	Ajit Kumar Saha	2,007	2.18	
SUCI(C)	Shaikh Harrooj Ali	2,004	2.18	
IUML	Harun-Li-Rasid Shaik	755	0.82	
IND	Shaikh Suruchand Ali	307	0.33	
Majority		918	0.99	
Turnout		93,688	78.32	
INC gain from RSP		Swing		

=== 1982 ===
1982 West Bengal Legislative Assembly election: Kaliganj
Party	Candidate	Votes	%	±%
RSP	Debsaran Ghosh	28,873	38.17	
INC	Shibsankar Bandyopadhayay	26,878	35.53	
IND	Rahman S. M. Fazlur	17,650	23.33	
IND	Mustafizur Rahaman	1,131	1.50	
IND	Probodh Ranjan Rajwar	1,116	1.48	
Majority		1,995	2.64	
Turnout		77,233	80.27	
RSP hold		Swing		

=== 1977 ===
1977 West Bengal Legislative Assembly election: Kaliganj
Party	Candidate	Votes	%	±%
RSP	Debsaran Ghosh	21,851	41.16	
JP	S. M. Fazlur Rahman	18,729	35.28	
INC	Shib Sankar Bandyopadhyay	12,188	22.96	
IUML	Md. Islam Molla	320	0.60	
Majority		3,122	5.88	
Turnout		53,943	71.16	
RSP gain from INC		Swing		

=== 1972 ===
1972 West Bengal Legislative Assembly election: Kaliganj
Party	Candidate	Votes	%	±%
INC	Shib Sankar Bandopdchayay	19,077	41.16	
CPI(M)	Mir Fakir Mohammad	15,757	34.00	
IND	Rame Dra Nath Mukherjee	8,536	18.42	
IUML	S. M. Narul Islam	2,976	6.42	
Majority		3,320	7.16	
Turnout		47,644	64.51	
INC gain from Independent		Swing		

=== 1971 ===
1971 West Bengal Legislative Assembly election: Kaliganj
Party	Candidate	Votes	%	±%
IND	Mir Fakir Mohammed	10,686	26.94	
IND	Mohammed Islam Molla	9,047	22.81	
INC(O)	Shiv Sankar Bandopadhay	7,287	18.37	
INC	Armanali Munshi	5,162	13.01	
RSP	Ghosh Debsaran	4,960	12.50	
CPI	Gurudas Sikdar	2,253	5.68	
IND	Sanatan Mandal	272	0.69	
Majority		1,639	4.13	
Turnout		45,134	62.49	
Independent gain from INC		Swing		

=== 1969 ===
1969 West Bengal Legislative Assembly election: Kaliganj
Party	Candidate	Votes	%	±%
INC	S. M. Fazlur Rahman	26,536	51.81	
BAC	Rafiuddin Mondal	24,685	48.19	
Majority		1,851	3.62	
Turnout		52,504	78.40	
INC hold		Swing		

=== 1967 ===
1967 West Bengal Legislative Assembly election: Kaliganj
Party	Candidate	Votes	%	±%
INC	S. M. F. Rahman	28,014	53.15	
BAC	R. N. Mukherjee	24,697	46.85	
Majority		3,317	6.30	
Turnout		54,851	81.92	
INC hold		Swing		

=== 1962 ===
1962 West Bengal Legislative Assembly election: Kaliganj (SC)
Party	Candidate	Votes	%	±%
INC	Syama Prosad Barman	11,703	39.06	
CPI	Amrita Lal Sarker	9,025	30.12	
SWA	Jatindra Nath Pramanik	7,190	23.99	
PSP	Anandi Roy Barman	2,047	6.83	
Majority		2,678	8.94	
Turnout		31,570	49.53	
INC hold		Swing		

=== 1957 ===
1957 West Bengal Legislative Assembly election: Nakashipara (SC) (2 seats)
Party	Candidate	Votes	%	±%
INC	S. M. Fazlur Rahman	43,926	39.86	
INC	Mahananda Haldar	42,585	38.64	
IND	Nihar Ranjan Roy	14,533	13.19	
IND	Bijoy Krishna Sarkar	9,167	8.32	
Majority		1,341	1.22	
Turnout		110,211	95.65	
INC hold		Swing		

=== 1951 ===
1951 West Bengal Legislative Assembly election: Kaliganj
Party	Candidate	Votes	%	±%
INC	Jonab S. M. Fazlur Rahaman	20,933	58.08	
ABJS	Makhan Lal Roy Choudhury	10,863	30.14	
IND	Nihar Ranjan Roy	1,607	4.46	
IND	Nripendranarayan Bandapadhya	1,220	3.39	
KMPP	Jonab Obedul Huq Kazi	1,040	2.89	
FB(RG)	Sasanka Kumar Patra	376	1.04	
Majority		10,070	27.94	
Turnout		36,039	62.35	
INC win (new seat)				
