= Chapra, Nadia (community development block) =

Chapra
- Community development block
- Coordinates: 23.53713°N 88.552742°E
- Country: India
- State: West Bengal
- District: Nadia

Government
  - Type: Community development block

Area
  - Total: 305.97 km^{2} (118.14 sq mi)
- Elevation: 17 m (56 ft)

Population (2011)
  - Total: 310,652
  - Density: 1,015.3/km^{2} (2,629.6/sq mi)

Languages
  - Official: Bengali, English

Literacy (2011)
  - Total literates: 186,119 (68.25%)
- Time zone: UTC+5:30 (IST)
- PIN: 741123 (Bangaljhi)
- Telephone/STD code: 03472
- Vehicle registration: WB-51, WB-52
- Lok Sabha constituency: Krishnanagar
- Vidhan Sabha constituency: Chapra
- Website: nadia.nic.in

Chapra is a community development block that forms an administrative division in Krishnanagar Sadar subdivision of Nadia district in the Indian state of West Bengal.

== Geography ==
Located at 23°32′14″N 88°33′10″E, Chapra CD Block is bounded by Tehatta I CD Block in the north, Damurhuda Upazila in Chuadanga District of Bangladesh in the east, Krishnaganj and Krishnanagar I CD Blocks, in the south and Krishnanagar II and Nakashipara CD Blocks in the west.

Nadia district is mostly alluvial plains lying to the east of Hooghly River, locally known as Bhagirathi. The alluvial plains are cut across by such distributaries as Jalangi, Churni and Ichhamati. With these rivers getting silted up, floods are a recurring feature.

Chapra CD Block has an area of 305.97 km^{2}. It has 1 panchayat samity, 13 gram panchayats, 220 gram sansads (village councils), 84 mouzas and 77 inhabited villages. Chapra police station serves this block. Headquarters of this CD Block is at Chapra.

Gram panchayats of blockChapra / panchayat samiti are: Alfa, Bagberia, Brittihuda, Chapra I, Chapra II, Hatisala I, Hatisala II, Hatkhola, Hridaypur, Kalinga, Mahatpur, Maheshpur and Pipragachhi.

== Demographics ==
=== Population ===
As per the 2011 Census of India, Chapra CD Block had a total population of 310,652, of which 296,592 were rural and 14,123 were urban. There were 159,736 (51%) males and 150,916 (49%) females. The population below 6 years was 37,953. Scheduled Castes numbered 49,252 (15.85%) and Scheduled Tribes numbered 2,027 (0.65%).

As per the 2001 census, Chapra block had a total population of 272,284, out of which 140,400 were males and 131,884 were females. Chapra block registered a population growth of 18.79 per cent during the 1991-2001 decade. Decadal growth for the district was 19.51 per cent. Decadal growth in West Bengal was 17.84 per cent.

There is only one census town in Chapra CD Block (2011 census figure in brackets): Chapra (14,123).

Large villages (with 4,000+ population) in Chapra CD Block were (2011 census figures in brackets): Hatisala (7,547), Mahesnagar (5,985), Bara Andulia (15,012), Sonpukar (4,874), Hridaypur (6,061), Betbaria (6,685), Hatra (7,087), Chhota Andulia (4,477), Bhatgachhi (4,189), Hatkhola (7,164), Sikra (6,359), Dompukur (7,101), Lakshmigachha (6,480), Brittihuda (7,336), Gokhurapota (4,656), Pitambarpur (4,591), Dwipchandrapur (4,769), Bangaljhi (15,448), Balidanga (4,212), Arangsarisha (4,623), Badelangi Padmamala (9,066) and Lakshmipur (4,492).

Other villages in Chapra CD Block include (2011 census figures in brackets): Alfa (2,688), Kalinga (892), Pipragachi (3,064), Maheshpur (2,062) and Bagberia (3,138).

=== Literacy ===
As per the 2011 census, the total number of literates in Chapra CD Block was 186,199 (68.28% of the population over 6 years) out of which males numbered 98,706 (70.30% of the male population over 6 years) and females numbered 87,493 (66.13% of the female population over 6 years). The gender disparity (the difference between female and male literacy rates) was 4.17%.

See also – List of West Bengal districts ranked by literacy rate

Literacy in CD blocks of
Nadia district
Tehatta subdivision
Karimpur I – 67.70%
Karimpur II – 62.04%
Tehatta I – 70.72%
Tehatta II – 68.52%
Krishnanagar Sadar subdivision
Kaliganj – 65.89%
Nakashipara – 64.86%
Chapra – 68.25%
Krishnanagar I – 71.45%
Krishnanagar II – 68.52%
Nabadwip – 67.72%
Krishnaganj – 72.86%
Ranaghat subdivision
Hanskhali – 80.11%
Santipur – 73.10%
Ranaghat I – 77.61%
Ranaghat II – 79.38%
Kalyani subdivision
Chakdaha – 64.17%
Haringhata – 82.15%
Source: 2011 Census: CD Block Wise
Primary Census Abstract Data

=== Language and religion ===
Religion in Chapra CD block (2011)
Islam	59.72%
Hinduism	37.15%
Christianity	3.05%
Other or not stated	0.08%

In the 2011 census, Muslims numbered 185,506 and formed 59.72% of the population in Chapra CD Block. Hindus numbered 115,396 and formed 37.15% of the population. Christians numbered 9,467 and formed 3.05% of the population. Others numbered 283 and formed 0.08% of the population.

In the 2001 census, Muslims numbered 156,727 and formed 57.56% of the population of Chapra CD Block. Hindus numbered 106,413 and formed 39.08% of the population. In the 1991 census, Muslims numbered 152,072 and formed 66.34% of the population. Hindus numbered 68,347 and formed 29.82% of the population of Chapra CD Block. Chapra Christ Church was established by Missionary society in 1840. It was one of the oldest church of Nadia.

Bengali is the predominant language, spoken by 98.97% of the population.

== Rural poverty ==
The District Human Development Report for Nadia has provided a CD Block-wise data table for Modified Human Vulnerability Index of the district. Chapra CD Block registered 39.58 on the MHPI scale. The CD Block-wise mean MHVI was estimated at 33.92. A total of 8 out of the 17 CD Blocks in Nadia district were found to be severely deprived when measured against the CD Block mean MHVI - Karimpur I and Karimpur II (under Tehatta subdivision), Kaliganj, Nakashipara, Chapra, Krishnanagar I and Nabadwip (under Krishnanagar Sadar subdivision) and Santipur (under Ranaghat subdivision) appear to be backward.

As per the Human Development Report 2004 for West Bengal, the rural poverty ratio in Nadia district was 28.35%. The estimate was based on Central Sample data of NSS 55th round 1999–2000.

== Economy ==
=== Livelihood ===
In Chapra CD Block in 2011, amongst the class of total workers, cultivators formed 27.29%, agricultural labourers 47.68%, household industry workers 2.83% and other workers 22.20%.

The southern part of Nadia district starting from Krishnanagar I down to Chakdaha and Haringhata has some urban pockets specialising in either manufacturing or service related economic activity and has reflected a comparatively higher concentration of population but the urban population has generally stagnated. Nadia district still has a large chunk of people living in the rural areas.

=== Infrastructure ===
There are 77 inhabited villages in Chapra CD Block. 100% villages have power supply and drinking water supply. 23 Villages (29.87%) have post offices. 75 villages (97.40%) have telephones (including landlines, public call offices and mobile phones). 38 villages (49.35%) have a pucca approach road and 50 villages (64.94%) have transport communication (includes bus service, rail facility and navigable waterways). 13 villages (16.88%) have agricultural credit societies and 14 villages (18.18%) have banks. Although 100% villages in Nadia district had power supply in 2011, a survey in 2007-08 revealed that less than 50% of households had electricity connection. In rural areas of the country, the tube well was for many years considered to be the provider of safe drinking water, but with arsenic contamination of ground water claiming public attention it is no longer so. Piped water supply is still a distant dream. In 2007–08, the availability of piped drinking water in Nadia district was as low as 8.6%, well below the state average of around 20%.

=== Agriculture ===
Persons engaged in agriculture
in Chapra CD Block
1. Bargadars (6.28%)
2. Patta holders (9.25%)
3. Small farmers (7.87%)
4. Marginal farmers (28.6%)
5. Agricultural labourers (48.0%)

Although the Bargadari Act of 1950 recognised the rights of bargadars to a higher share of crops from the land that they tilled, it was not implemented fully. Large tracts, beyond the prescribed limit of land ceiling, remained with the rich landlords. From 1977 onwards major land reforms took place in West Bengal. Land in excess of land ceiling was acquired and distributed amongst the peasants. Following land reforms land ownership pattern has undergone transformation. In 2013–14, persons engaged in agriculture in Chapra CD Block could be classified as follows: bargadars 6.28%, patta (document) holders 9.25%, small farmers (possessing land between 1 and 2 hectares) 7.87%, marginal farmers (possessing land up to 1 hectare) 28.62% and agricultural labourers 47.98%. As the proportion of agricultural labourers is very high, the real wage in the agricultural sector has been a matter of concern.

Chapra CD Block had 355 fertiliser depots, 34 seed stores and 65 fair price shops in 2013–14.

In 2013–14, Chapra CD Block produced 57,747 tonnes of Aman paddy, the main winter crop from 20,658 hectares, 44,098 tonnes of Boro paddy (spring crop) from 13,744 hectares, 13,212 tonnes of Aus paddy (summer crop) from 5,384 hectares, 2,205 tonnes of wheat from 871 hectares, 126,190 tonnes of jute from 7,489 hectares and 638 tonnes of potatoes from 25 hectares. It also produced pulses and oilseeds.

In 2013–14, the total area irrigated in Chapra CD Block was 1,370 hectares, out of which 618 hectares were irrigated by river lift irrigation and 752 hectares by deep tube wells.

=== Banking ===
In 2013–14, Chapra CD Block had offices of 8 commercial banks and 4 gramin banks.

== Transport ==
SH 11, running from Mahammad Bazar (in Birbhum district) to Ranaghat (in Nadia district) passes through this CD Block. Chapra is connected with District headquarters by bus.

== Education ==
In 2013–14, Chapra CD Block had 155 primary schools with 17,027 students, 19 middle schools with 3,778 students, 5 high school with 2,434 students and 21 higher secondary schools with 36,085 students. Chapra CD Block had 1 general college with 3,081 students, 2 technical/ professional institutions with 197 students and 440 institutions for special and non-formal education with 19,427 students

In Chapra CD Block, amongst the 77 inhabited villages, all villages had primary schools, 54 had more than 1 primary school, 38 had at least 1 primary and 1 middle school and 18 had at least 1 middle and 1 secondary school.

Chapra Bangaljhi Mahavidyalaya was established at Bangaljhi in 2001. Affiliated to the University of Kalyani, it offers honours courses in Bengali, English, Sanskrit, history, geography, political science, philosophy, education and sociology. Hat Chapra King Edward High School is one of the oldest school in the district situated in the block.

== Healthcare ==
In 2014, Chapra CD Block had 1 rural hospital, 2 primary health centres, 1 central government medical institution and 4 private nursing homes with total 78 beds and 6 doctors (excluding private bodies). It had 33 family welfare subcentres. 30,435 patients were treated indoor and 318,828 patients were treated outdoor in the hospitals, health centres and subcentres of the CD Block.

Chapra Rural Hospital, with 25 beds at Bangaljhi, is the major government medical facility in the Chapra CD block. There are primary health centres at Hridaypur (with 10 beds) and Bagberia (with 6 beds).

Chapra CD Block is one of the areas of Nadia district where ground water is affected by moderate level of arsenic contamination. The WHO guideline for arsenic in drinking water is 10 mg/ litre, and the Indian Standard value is 50 mg/ litre. All the 17 blocks of Nadia district have arsenic contamination above this level. The maximum concentration in Chapra CD Block is 310 mg/litre.
