= Iswarchandrapur =

- Village
- Location in West Bengal, India Iswarchandrapur (India)
- Coordinates: 23.7°N 88.55°E
- Country: India
- State: West Bengal
- District: Nadia

Government
  - Body: Hanspukuria GP

Population (2011)
  - Total: 2,471

Languages
  - Official: Bengali, English
- Time zone: UTC+5:30 (IST)
- PIN: 741160
- Telephone code: 91 3471
- Sex ratio: 921 females/1000 males
- Lok Sabha constituency: Krishnanagar
- Vidhan Sabha constituency: Palshipara

Iswarchandrapur is a village in Hanspukuria Gram Panchayat in Tehatta II CD Block in Tehatta subdivision of Nadia district. It is situated beside the river Jalangi.

== Demographics ==
As per the 2011 Census of India, Iswarchandrapur had a total population of 2,471, of which 1,286 (52%) were males and 1,185 (48%) were females. Population below 6 years was 207. The total number of literates in Iswarchandrapur was 1,742 (76.94% of the population over 6 years).

== Administration ==
Iswarchandrapur is administrated by Hanspukuria Gram Panchayet under Tehatta sub division.

== Education ==
The village has two primary schools:

1. Iswarchandrapur Paschimpara Primary School
2. Iswarchandrapur Purbapara Primary School

Nearby High Schools:

1. Nimtala Vidhya Niketan (H.S)
2. Hanspukuria Vidyapith (H.S)

Nearby college Tehatta Government College is established in 2015 under the University of Kalyani. The College began operations from the 2015-16 session with the faculty strength growing to 12 by the end of the session. Currently 5 arts subjects are taught and 3 science subjects shall be added soon. Nearby another college is Dr. B.R. Ambedkar College located in Betai, about 20 km from central of Tehatta.

Another D.L.Ed college named Tehatta Institute of Education is located in Arshiganj, about 5 km from Iswarchandrapur village beside Tehatta - Shyamnagar road.

== Literacy ==
Iswarchandrapur village has higher literacy rate compared to West Bengal. In 2011, literacy rate of Iswarchandrapur village was 76.94% compared to 76.26% of West Bengal. In Iswarchandrapur Male literacy stands at 77.77% while female literacy rate was 76.07%.

== Healthcare ==
A health sub-center is located at the centre of the village. Tehatta sub-divisional hospital is about 10 km away. Krishnanagar Sadar Hospital is about 50 km away.

== Festivals ==
Although almost all Hindu festivals are observed here, notable in recent decades has been the Durga Puja. The puja is celebrated with much pomp and grandeur during the waxing phase of the moon in the Bengali month of Kartik. There are about 4 puja committees.

== Transportation ==
Roads and highways

Iswarchandrapur is around 50 km north from the district town Krishnanagar and 150 km north from the state capital Kolkata. Iswarchandrapur is well connected with Krishnanagar and Karimpur via the Krishnanagar-Karimpur bus route, (State Highway 11), and also connected with NH 12 (old number NH 34) via the Tehatta-Palashi/Tehatta Ghat-Debagram route.

Railway systems

The nearest railway station for connecting to Kolkata is Debagram. There is also another station named Palashi Railway Station within 20–25 km at Palashi for connecting to Krishnanagar and Berhampur.
