= Bangaljhi =

- Village
- Location in West Bengal, India Bangaljhi (India)
- Coordinates: 23.51213°N 88.542742°E
- Country: India
- State: West Bengal
- District: Nadia

Population (2011)
  - Total: 15,448

Languages
  - Official: Bengali, English
- Time zone: UTC+5:30 (IST)
- PIN: 741123 (Bangaljhi)
- Telephone/STD code: 03472
- Lok Sabha constituency: Krishnanagar
- Vidhan Sabha constituency: Chapra
- Website: nadia.gov.in

Bangaljhi is a village in the Chapra CD block in the Krishnanagar Sadar subdivision of the Nadia district in the state of West Bengal, India.

== Geography ==
Cities and towns in Krishnanagr Sadar subdivision of Nadia district
M: municipal town/ city, CT: census town, R: rural/ urban centre, H: place of historical/ religious interest, T: place of tourist interest.
Owing to space constraints in the small map, the actual locations in a larger map may vary slightly

=== Location ===
Bangaljhi is located at 23.51213°N 88.542742°E.

Bangaljhi has an area of 300.85 hectares. It is part of Chapra II gram panchayat. The district headquarters, Krishnanagar, is around 16 km away. The Jalangi flows nearby.

=== Area overview ===
Nadia district is mostly alluvial plains lying to the east of Hooghly River, locally known as Bhagirathi. The alluvial plains are cut across by such distributaries as Jalangi, Churni and Ichhamati. With these rivers getting silted up, floods are a recurring feature. The Krishnanagar Sadar subdivision, presented in the map alongside, has the Bhagirathi on the west, with Purba Bardhaman district lying across the river. The long stretch along the Bhagirathi has many swamps. The area between the Bhagirathi and the Jalangi, which flows through the middle of the subdivision, is known as Kalantar, a low-lying tract of black clay soil. A big part of the subdivision forms the Krishnanagar-Santipur Plain, which occupies the central part of the district. The Jalangi, after flowing through the middle of the subdivision, turns right and joins the Bhagirathi. On the south-east, the Churni separates the Krishnanagar-Santipur Plain from the Ranaghat-Chakdaha Plain. The east forms the boundary with Bangladesh. The subdivision is moderately urbanized. 20.795% of the population lives in urban areas and 79.205% lives in rural areas.

Note: The map alongside presents some of the notable locations in the subdivision. All places marked in the map are linked in the larger full screen map. All the four subdivisions are presented with maps on the same scale – the size of the maps vary as per the area of the subdivision.

== Demographics ==
According to the 2011 Census of India, Bangaljhi had a total population of 15,448, of which 7,831 (51%) were males and 7,617 (49%) were females. Population in the age range 0–6 years was 1,867. The total number of literate persons in Bangaljhi was 9,894 (72.85% of the population over 6 years).

== Transport ==
State Highway 11, running from Mahammad Bazar (in Birbhum district) to Ranaghat (in Nadia district), passes through Chapra, an adjacent census town.

== Education ==
Chapra Bangaljhi Mahavidyalaya was established at Bangaljhi in 2001. Affiliated to the University of Kalyani, it offers honours courses in Bengali, English, Sanskrit, history, geography, political science, philosophy, education and sociology. Hat Chapra King Edward High School (established in 1841), one of the oldest high school in the district is situated at Bangaljhi.
