= Chapra Christ Church =

Church in West Bengal, India

Coordinates: 23°31′32.04″N 88°33′04.89″E

Chapra Christ Church, commonly known as Chapra Church, is one of the oldest Christian churches in Nadia district of India. It is located in Chapra in the Indian state of West Bengal. The church was established by the Church Missionary Society in the 1830s, with its building being constructed in 1840. It is overseen by the Diocese of Barrackpore of the Church of North India.

== History ==
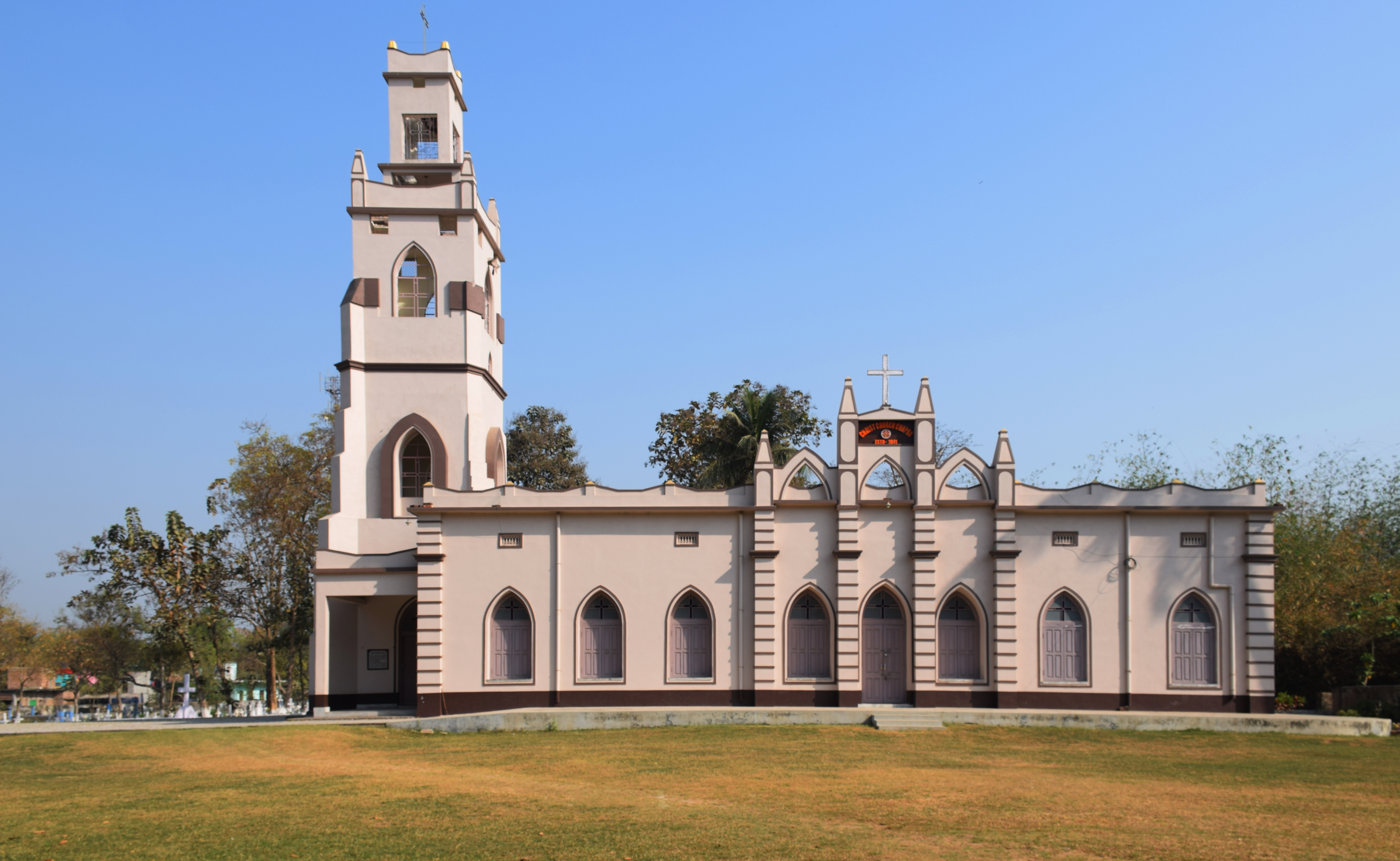
Chapra Christ Church

In the 19th century, Chapra, Nadia was the center of missionary works for the Meherpur subdivision of the undivided Bengal (now West Bengal, India). In the 1830s, the Church Missionary Society of the Church of England began its work in Chapra. The congregation it established built Chapra Christ Church in 1840; the church opened in 1841.

Chapra Christ Church and the Church Missionary Society started a school for boys in 1850. In 1908, the school had 202 students. It is now operated by the Indian government as Hat Chapra King Edward High School. In 1956, the church became part of the newly established Diocese of Barrackpore of the Church of North India.

Chapra Christ Church has coordinated Chapra's Christmas Christian Fair since 1914. The four-day fair blends traditional Christian and Indian traditions and has some 20,000 participants each year. For example, Christian kirtans are composed and performed for each fair, along with traditional Christian prayers. The event also includes a football tournament, craft and food sales, a stick play, and exhibits of crafts and animals.
