= Tehatta Assembly constituency =

Tehatta
- Constituency No. 78 for the West Bengal Legislative Assembly
- Interactive Map Outlining Tehatta Assembly Constituency

Constituency details
- Country: India
- Region: East India
- State: West Bengal
- District: Nadia
- Lok Sabha constituency: Krishnanagar
- Established: 1951
- Total electors: 252,454
- Reservation: None

Member of Legislative Assembly
- 18th West Bengal Legislative Assembly
- Incumbent Subrata Kabiraj
- Party: Bharatiya Janata Party
- Elected year: 2026

Tehatta Assembly constituency is an assembly constituency in Nadia district in the Indian state of West Bengal.

== Overview ==
As per orders of the Delimitation Commission, No. 78 Tehatta Assembly constituency is composed of the following: Betai I, Betai II, Chhitka, Kanainagar, Natna, Patharghata I, Raghunathpur, Shyamnagar and Tehatta gram panchayats of Tehatta I community development block and Dighal, Kandi, Nandanpur, Narayanpur I and Narayanpur II gram panchayats of Karimpur II CD Block.

Tehatta Assembly constituency is part of No. 12 Krishnanagar Lok Sabha constituency.

== Members of the Legislative Assembly ==
Election Year	Member	Party
Tehatta
1951	Raghunandan Biswas	Indian National Congress
1957	Shankardas Bandopadhyay	Indian National Congress
1962	Shankardas Bandopadhyay	Indian National Congress
1967	Shankardas Bandopadhyay	Indian National Congress
1969	Surat Ali Khan	Indian National Congress
1971	Madhabendu Mohanta	Communist Party of India (Marxist)
1972	Kartik Chandra Biswas	Indian National Congress
Constituency did not exist between 1977-2006 (Note: The Tehatta assembly seat was not there between 1977 and 2006. Palashipara Assembly constituency and Chapra, West Bengal Assembly constituency existed in the area.)
2011	Ranjit Mondal	Communist Party of India (Marxist)
2016	Gouri Sankar Dutta	Trinamool Congress
2021	Tapas Kumar Saha	Trinamool Congress
2026	Subrata Kabiraj	Bharatiya Janata Party

== Election results ==
=== 2026 ===
2026 West Bengal Legislative Assembly election: Tehatta
Party	Candidate	Votes	%	±%
BJP	Subrata Kabiraj	112,138	48.01	+6.32
AITC	Dilip Kumar Poddar	83,885	35.91	−8.95
CPI(M)	Subodh Chandra Biswas	25,629	10.97	+0.32
AJUP	Jamat Ali Mandal	5,134	2.2	
INC	Jyotirmoy Sarkar	2,383	1.02	
NOTA	None of the above	922	0.39	−0.41
Majority		28,253	12.1	+8.93
Turnout		233,588	92.04	+5.64
BJP gain from AITC		Swing		

=== 2021 ===
2021 West Bengal Legislative Assembly election: Tehatta
Party	Candidate	Votes	%	±%
AITC	Tapas Kumar Saha	97,848	44.86	
BJP	Ashutosh Paul	90,933	41.69	+33.25
CPI(M)	Subodh Chandra Biswas	23,239	10.65	−29.65
NOTA	None of the above	1,736	0.8	
Majority		6,915	3.17	
Turnout		218,109	86.4	
AITC hold		Swing		

=== 2016 ===
In the 2016 election, Gouri Sankar Dutta of Trinamool Congress defeated his nearest rival, Ranjit Kumar Mondal of Communist Party of India (Marxist).

West Bengal assembly elections, 2016: Tehatta constituency
Party	Candidate	Votes	%	±%
AITC	Gouri Sankar Dutta	97,611	49.04	+29.12
CPI(M)	Ranjit Kumar Mondal	80,215	40.30	−2.48
BJP	Arjun Kumar Biswas	16,809	8.44	+4.43
BSP	Arabinda Biswas	1,918	0.96	
NOTA	None of the above	1,444	0.73	
SUCI(C)	Sherful Ansary	1,063	0.53	
Turnout		199,060	86.33	−2.23
AITC gain from CPI(M)		Swing		

=== 2011 ===
In the 2011 election, Ranjit Kumar Mondal of Communist Party of India (Marxist) defeated his nearest rival Tapas Kumar Saha, an independent candidate.

West Bengal assembly elections, 2011: Tehatta constituency
Party	Candidate	Votes	%	±%
CPI(M)	Ranjit Kumar Mondal	75,445	42.78	
Independent	Tapas Kumar Saha	56,248	31.90	
AITC	Gouri Sankar Dutta	35,127	19.92	
BJP	Asutosh Paul	7,067	4.01	
BSP	Tapan Bala	2,458		
Turnout		176,345	88.56	
CPI(M) win (new seat)				

Tapash Kumar Saha, contesting as an independent candidate, was a rebel Trinamool Congress candidate.

=== 2006 ===
The Tehatta assembly seat was not there between 1977 and 2006. Palashipara Assembly constituency and Chapra, West Bengal Assembly constituency existed in the area.

=== 1972 ===
Kartik Chandra Biswas of Congress won in 1972. Madhabendu Mohanta of CPI(M) won in 1971. Surat Ali Khan of Congress won in 1969. Shankardas Bandopadhyay of Congress won in 1967,1962 and 1957. In independent India's first election in 1951, Raghunandan Biswas of Congress won the Tehatta seat.
