= Jeber Sekh =

Indian politician (born 1977)

Jeber Sekh (born 1977) is an Indian politician from West Bengal. He is a member of the West Bengal Legislative Assembly from the Chapra Assembly constituency in Nadia district representing the Democratic Trinamool Congress.

== Early life and education ==
Sekh is from Chapra, Nadia district, West Bengal. He is the son of the late Ajit Sekh. He studied up to Class 8 at Islamgonj High Madrasah, Chapra Bangalijhi and dropped out in 1991. He runs his own corn and jute business. He declared assets worth Rs.48 lakhs in his affidavit to the Election Commission of India.

== Career ==
Sekh won the Chapra, West Bengal Assembly constituency representing the Bharatiya Janata Party in the 2026 West Bengal Legislative Assembly election. He polled 97,085 votes and defeated his nearest rival, Saikat Sarkar of the Bharatiya Janata Party, by a margin of 30,780 votes. He lost the Chapra seat in the 2021 West Bengal Legislative Assembly election as an independent candidate to Rukbanur Rahman of the All India Trinamool Congress by a margin of 12,118 votes.
