= Palashipara Mahatma Gandhi Smriti Vidyapith =

School in Nadia, West Bengal

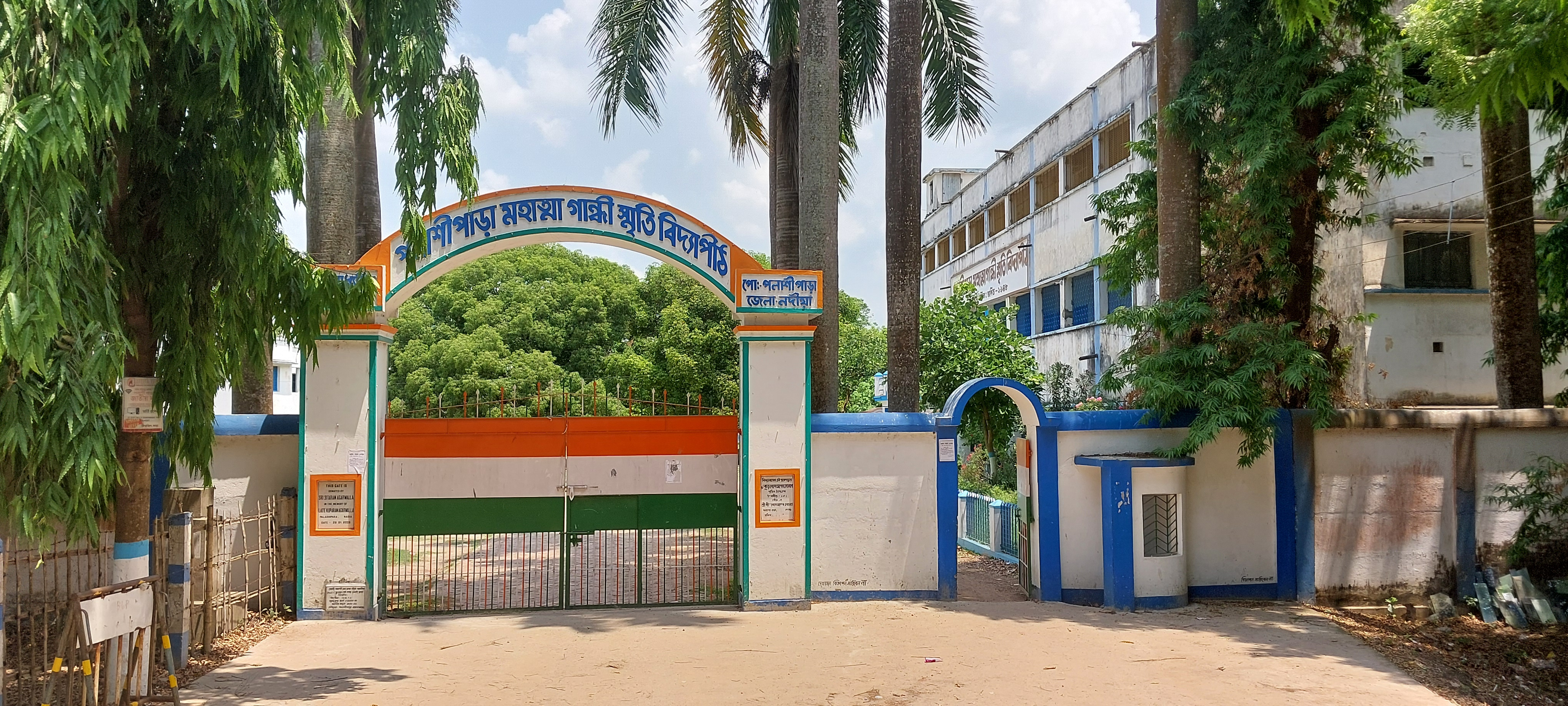
- Palashipara M.G.S Vidyapith front gate

Location
- Betai – Palashi Road, Palashipara, Nadia; Palashipara, West Bengal, 741155; India
- 23.7934°N 88.4477°E

Information
- School type: Quasi-official
- Religious affiliation: Secular
- Established: 1948
- Sister school: Palashipara MGS Balika Vidyalaya
- School board: WBBSE
- Authority: West Bengal Board of Secondary Education
- Category: Higher Secondary
- Head teacher: Sadhan Biswas
- Executive headteacher: Subrata Biswas
- Campus: Rural
- Website: N/A

Palashipara Mahatma Gandhi Smriti Vidyapith popularly known as Palashipara M.G.S. Vidyapith is one of the old educational institutes of Nadia district, West Bengal. It is situated in Tehatta II block, at Palashipara.

== History ==
The school was established in 1948 and constructed by the local population with the help of social workers. The infrastructure of school was improved during the 1950s when Indian National Congress leader. Dr. Raghunandan Biswas was a Member of the Legislative Assembly. Initially it was affiliated to the University of Calcutta. A two-storied dormitory was constructed for housing student attendees from distant areas that had no higher secondary schools. The building was transferred to the primary school section. The Mahatma Gandhi Smriti Balika Vidyapith (for girls) is situated within a kilometer from this school.

== Infrastructure ==
This is a boys school and the higher secondary section is co-educational. The curriculum emphasizes science, arts and commerce. There are three laboratories, as well as computer education facilities and a library. The three different sections of education each have their own building: Primary, Madhyamik and Higher Secondary. The school compound contains the teachers' quarters. The school is now under the governance of the West Bengal Board of Secondary Education.

== Sports ==
The school competes with success in athletics, particularly football, reaching district and state levels. Members of the senior-level football team have participated in the Kolkata super division club and national levels. They have their own playing ground just beside the school.

== Gallery ==
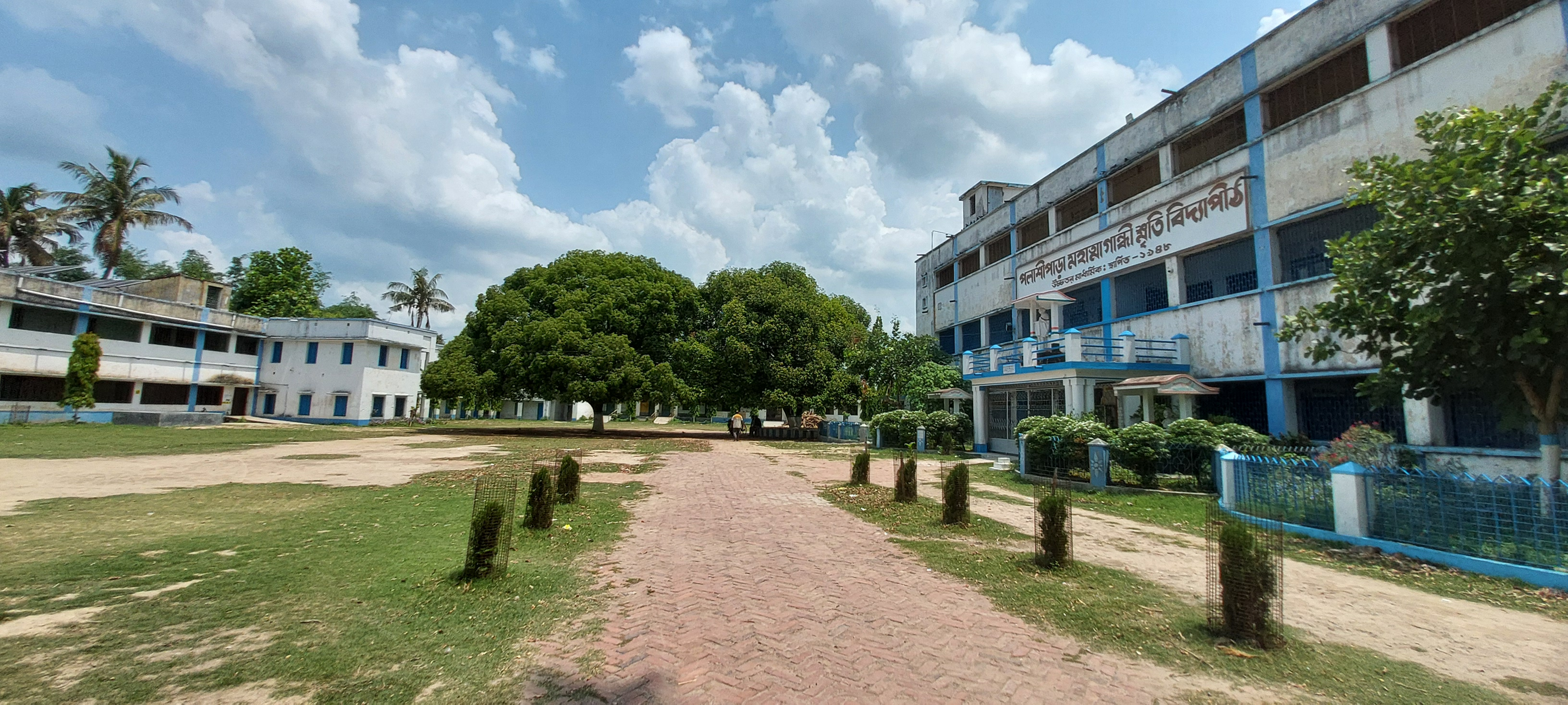
Administrative building

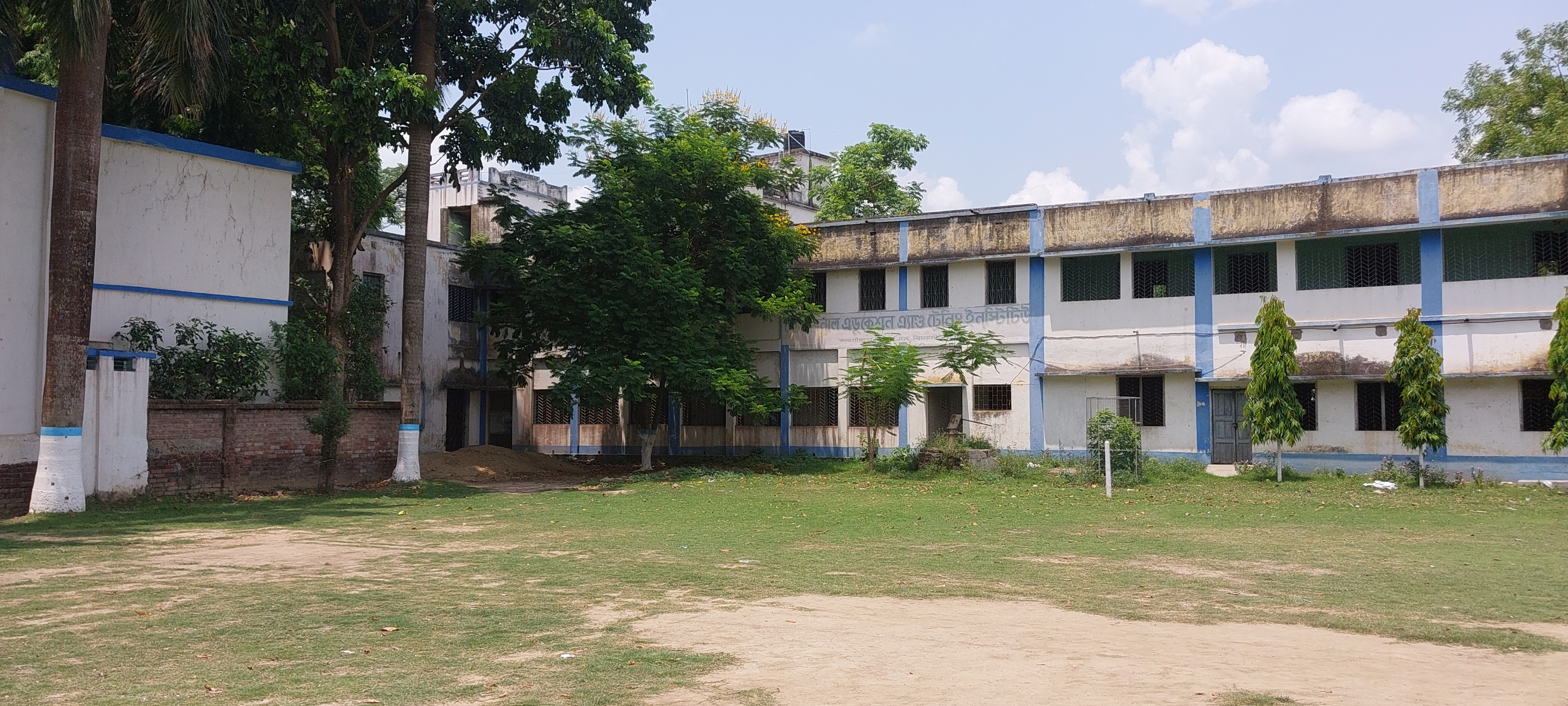
Vocational training building

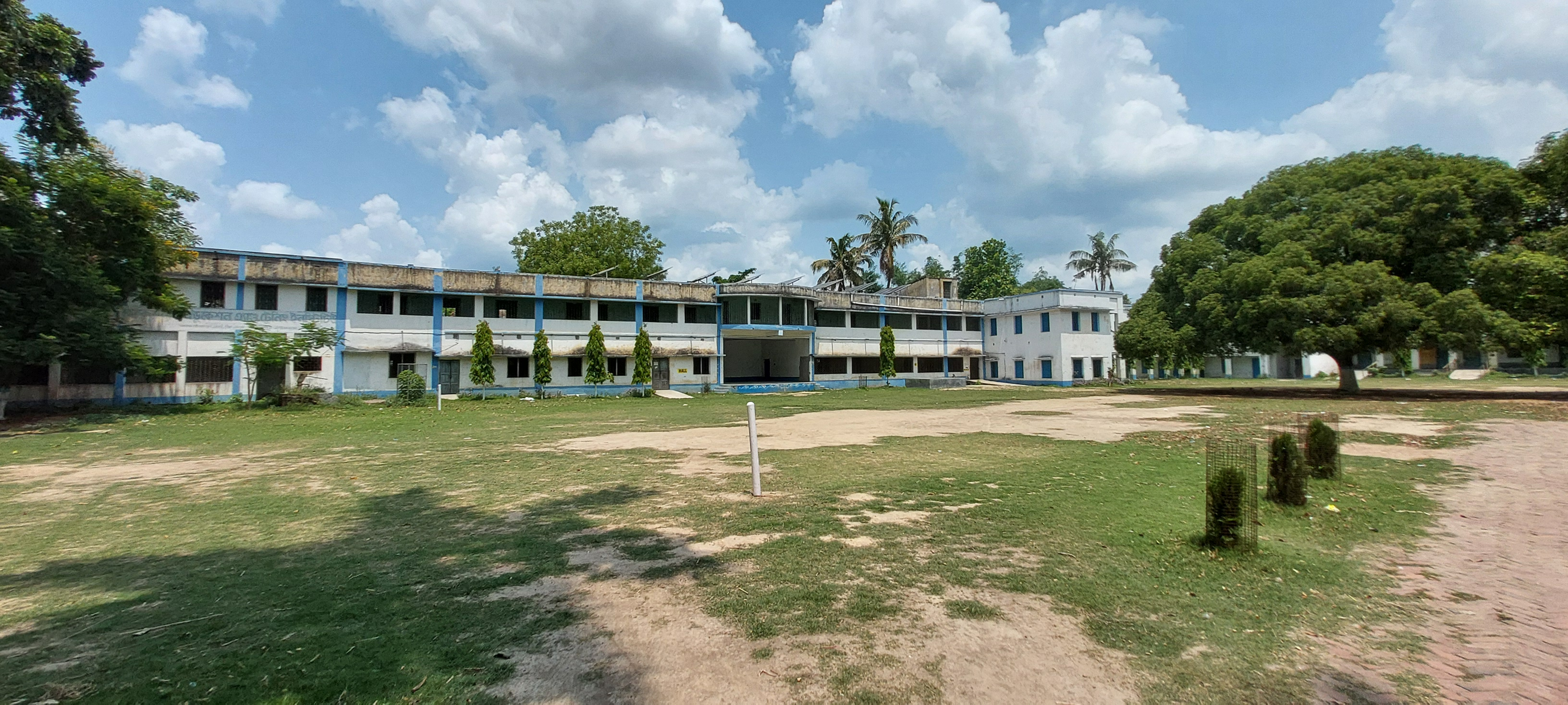
Campus of Palashipara Mahatma Gandhi Smriti Vidyapith
