= Barnia =

Village in West Bengal, India

- Village
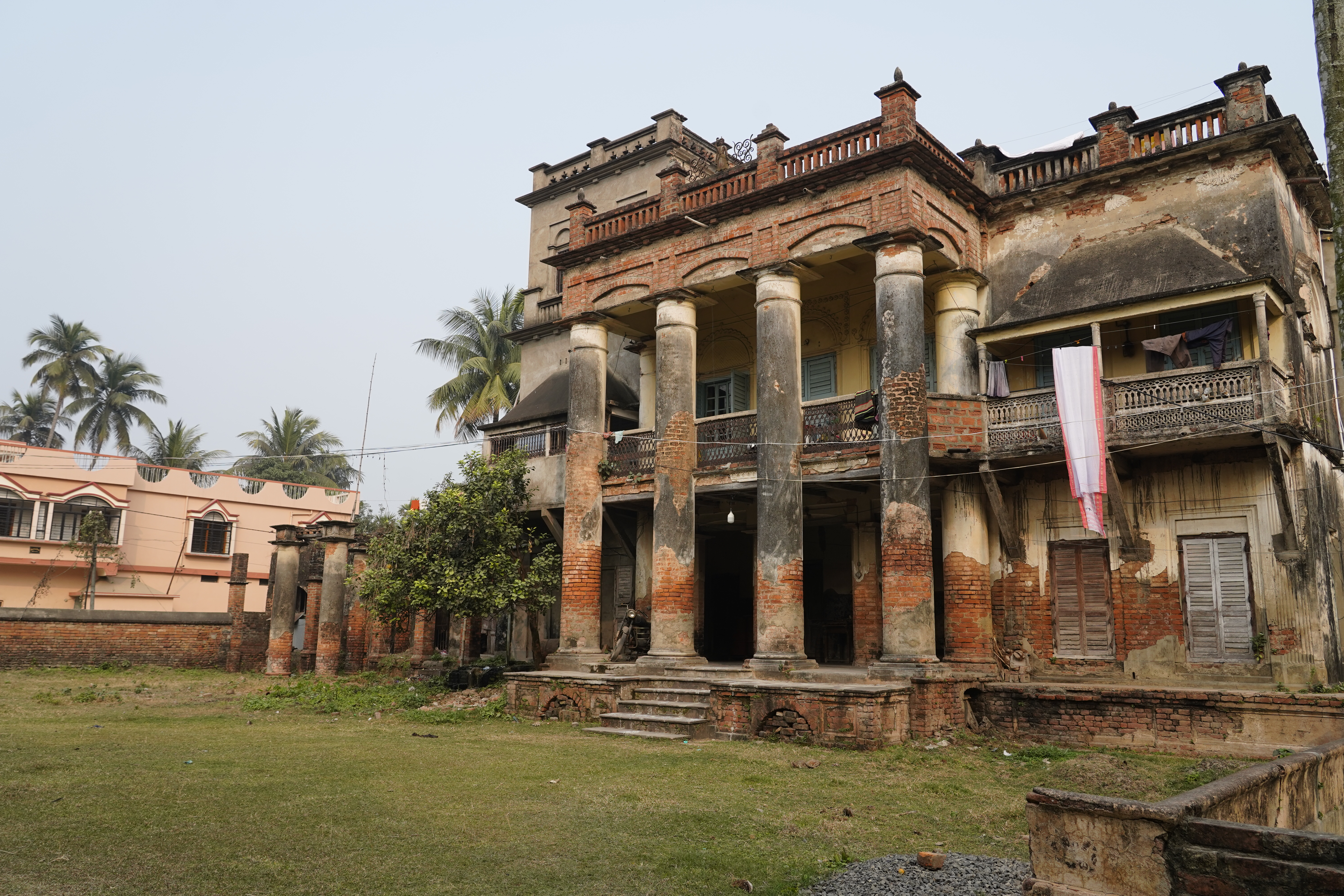
- Former mansion of Ghosh Chowdhury Zamindar, currently a historical landmark of Barnia

- Location within West Bengal Location within India
- Coordinates: 23°43′52″N 88°23′30″E
- Country: India
- State: West Bengal
- District: Nadia
- Block: Tehatta II

Government
  - Type: Gram Panchayat

Area
  - Total: 16.59 km^{2} (6.41 sq mi)
- Elevation: 14 m (46 ft)

Population (2011)
  - Total: 16,350
  - Density: 985.5/km^{2} (2,553/sq mi)

Languages
  - Official: Bengali
  - Other: Hindi, English
- Time zone: UTC+5:30 (IST)
- PIN: 741156
- Telephone code: 03474

Barnia is a village in Tehatta-II Block, Nadia District, West Bengal, India. It is located near the border with Bangladesh, about 38 kilometres north of the district capital Krishnanagar, and 9 kilometres south of the block capital Palashipara. As of 2011, the village has a population of 16,350.

== Geography ==
Barnia is situated on the west of Jalangi River. It is on the south of Biljiala, west of Hanspukuria, north of Uzirpur, and east of Charakpota. Barnia-Tehatta Road passes through the village. Its average elevation is at 14 metres above the sea level.

== Demographics ==
According to the 2011 Indian Census, Barnia has a total of 3,778 households. Out of the 16,350 residents, 8,312 are male, and 8,038 are female. The total literacy rate is at 56.22%, with 4,978 of the male population and 4,214 of the female population being literate. The census location code is 321277.
