= Mir Quasem Mondal =

Indian politician

Mir Quasem Mondal, MLA

Member of the Legislative Assembly, West Bengal
- In office 1987–1996

Personal details
- Born: 1931 Nadia district, West Bengal, India
- Died: 28 January 2024 (aged 92)
- Party: Communist Party of India (Marxist)

Mir Quasem Mondal was an Indian politician from West Bengal, who served as the Member of the Legislative Assembly (MLA) for the Chapra constituency in Nadia district for three consecutive terms from 1987 to 1996. Representing the Communist Party of India (Marxist) (CPIM), he spent 15 years contributing to the development of the Chapra constituency.

== Early life and education ==
Mir Quasem Mondal was born in 1931. He received his primary education from a local school, and later became a school teacher.

== Political career ==
- 1964: Selected as the Communist Party of India (Marxist) member.
- 1987: Elected as the MLA for the Chapra constituency for the first time, representing the CPIM.
- 1991 and 1996: Re-elected as the MLA for Chapra constituency for two consecutive terms
- 1987-1996: Served a total of 15 years as the MLA

== Death ==
He died on 28 January 2024.
