= Gouri Sankar Dutta =

Indian politician (died 2021)

Member of the West Bengal Legislative Assembly
- In office 2016–2021
- Preceded by: Ranjit Mondal
- Succeeded by: Tapas Kumar Saha
- Constituency: Tehatta

Personal details
- Party: Bharatiya Janata Party (2021)
- Other political affiliations: All India Trinamool Congress (2016–2021)
- Occupation: Politician

Gouri Sankar Dutta was an Indian Politician from the state of West Bengal. He was a member of the West Bengal Legislative Assembly. He represented the Tehatta assembly constituency as a member of the All India Trinamool Congress. In March 2021, he along with Bachchu Hansda joined Bharatiya Janata Party after being denied ticket for 2021 West Bengal Legislative Assembly election. He died of COVID-19 at age 70 on 28 April 2021.

== Education ==
Dutta passed B.Com. in 1970 from Calcutta University. He has also undergone studies under Institute of Chartered Accountants of India but did not appear at the examination.
