= Tapas Kumar Saha =

Indian politician (1960–2025)

Member of the West Bengal Legislative Assembly
- In office 2021–2025
- Preceded by: Gouri Sankar Dutta
- Succeeded by: Subrata Kabiraj
- Constituency: Tehatta
- In office 2016–2021
- Preceded by: S. M. Saadi
- Succeeded by: Manik Bhattacharya
- Constituency: Palashipara

Personal details
- Born: 31 January 1960
- Died: 15 May 2025 (aged 65) Kolkata, West Bengal, India
- Party: Trinamool Congress
- Education: Dr. B. R. Ambedkar College

Tapas Kumar Saha (31 January 1960 – 15 May 2025) was an Indian politician from West Bengal. He was a member of the West Bengal Legislative Assembly from the Tehatta Assembly constituency in Nadia district. He was elected in the 2021 West Bengal Legislative Assembly election representing the All India Trinamool Congress party.

== Early life and education ==
Saha was from Karuigachi, Tehatta in Nadia district, West Bengal. He was the son of the late Tara Pada Saha. He completed his BA in 1982 at Dr BR Ambedkar College, Betai, Nadia district, which is affiliated with the University of Calcutta.

== Career ==
Saha won the Tehatta Assembly constituency representing the All India Trinamool Congress in the 2021 West Bengal Legislative Assembly election. He polled 97,848 votes and defeated his nearest rival, Ashutosh Paul of the Bharatiya Janata Party, by a margin of 6,915 votes. Earlier, he had first become an MLA winning the 2016 West Bengal Legislative Assembly election in Palashipara Assembly constituency on the Trinamool Congress ticket, defeating SM Sadi of the Communist Party of India (Marxist) by a margin of 5,559 votes.

In April 2023, Central Bureau of Investigation officials raided Saha's house in connection with an alleged corruption case and in June 2024, he was summoned to the CBI's Nizam Palace office in Kolkata.

== Death ==
On 15 May 2025, Saha died of a cerebral haemorrhage in Kolkata. He was 65.
