= Manik Bhattacharya =

Legislator of West Bengal

Member of the West Bengal Legislative Assembly
- In office 7 May 2021 – 2026
- Preceded by: Tapas Kumar Saha
- Succeeded by: Rukbanur Rahman
- Constituency: Palashipara, Nadia

President of the West Bengal Board of Primary Education
- In office 2011–2022
- Succeeded by: Goutam Pal

Personal details
- Party: Trinamool Congress
- Education: M.Com, B.Ed, L.L.M., Ph.D.
- Alma mater: Calcutta University; Burdwan University

Manik Bhattacharya is an Indian teacher, advocate and politician who served as president of West Bengal Board of Primary Education (WBBPE) until 2022. During SLST Examination 2016, he was the president of WBBPE. In late 2023, he was admitted to SSKM Hospital, citing chest pains.[11] A member of Trinamool Congress, he is serving as member of West Bengal Legislative Assembly from Palashipara, Nadia since 7 May 2021. He was arrested by ED on 11 October 2022 in connection with 2022 West Bengal School Service Commission recruitment scam. He got bail from Calcutta High Court in September 2024.

== Education ==
Bhattacharya earned a Bachelor of Commerce in 1975 at Calcutta University followed by a master's degree in 1977. He later studied B.Ed. in 1982. He also earned a bachelor's degree from Law in 1981. Bhattacharya later completed L.L.M. From Utkal University in 1997 and earned a Ph.D. From Burdwan University in 1998.

== Career ==
=== Teaching career ===
Bhattacharya joined Jogesh Chandra Chaudhuri Law College as teaching clerk in 1998. At the same time during Left Front Administration, he was promoted to Principal in that college. He retired after entering politics. In 2023, during a trial on West Bengal School Service Commission (SSC) recruitment scam at Calcutta High Court, the University Grant Commission and the State Government submitted an affidavit, admitting that the appointment of Bhattacharya as the principal had flouted all norms.

=== Political career ===
He joined Trinamool Congress in 2011, and contested from Palashipara seat but lost to his rival and then legislator S. M. Sadi of CPI(M).

=== As President of State Primary Education Board ===
Following his defeat in 2011 elections, the State Government appointed him as State Primary Education Board President in 2011. In August 2022, he was removed from this post following his arrest on SSC scam by Enforcement Directorate (ED) and replaced by Goutam Paul.

== Controversies ==
Manik Bhattacharya was arrested by the Enforcement Directorate on 11 October 2022 in connection with 2022 West Bengal School Service Commission recruitment scam. During SLST Examination 2016, he was the president of WBBPE. In late 2023, he was admitted to SSKM Hospital, citing chest pains.[11] During SLST Examination 2016, he was the president of WBBPE. In late 2023, he was admitted to SSKM Hospital, citing chest pains.
