= Chapra, Nadia =

Chapra
- Census Town
- Location in West Bengal, India Chapra (India)
- Coordinates: 23.539132°N 88.546742°E
- Country: India
- State: West Bengal
- District: Nadia

Area
  - Total: 4.1232 km^{2} (1.5920 sq mi)

Population (2011)
  - Total: 14,123
  - Density: 3,425.3/km^{2} (8,871.4/sq mi)

Languages
  - Official: Bengali, English
- Time zone: UTC+5:30 (IST)
- Telephone code: 03472
- Vehicle registration: WB
- Lok Sabha constituency: Krishnanagar
- Vidhan Sabha constituency: Chapra
- Website: nadia.gov.in

Chapra is a census town and a gram panchayat in the Chapra CD block in the Krishnanagar Sadar subdivision of the Nadia district in the state of West Bengal, India.

== Geography ==
Cities and towns in Krishnanagr Sadar subdivision of Nadia district
M: municipal town/ city, CT: census town, R: rural/ urban centre, H: place of historical/ religious interest, T: place of tourist interest.
Owing to space constraints in the small map, the actual locations in a larger map may vary slightly

=== Location ===
Chapra is located at 23.539132°N 88.546742°E.

=== Area overview ===
Nadia district is mostly alluvial plains lying to the east of Hooghly River, locally known as Bhagirathi. The alluvial plains are cut across by such distributaries as Jalangi, Churni and Ichhamati. With these rivers getting silted up, floods are a recurring feature. The Krishnanagar Sadar subdivision, presented in the map alongside, has the Bhagirathi on the west, with Purba Bardhaman district lying across the river. The long stretch along the Bhagirathi has many swamps. The area between the Bhagirathi and the Jalangi, which flows through the middle of the subdivision, is known as Kalantar, a low-lying tract of black clay soil. A big part of the subdivision forms the Krishnanagar-Santipur Plain, which occupies the central part of the district. The Jalangi, after flowing through the middle of the subdivision, turns right and joins the Bhagirathi. On the south-east, the Churni separates the Krishnanagar-Santipur Plain from the Ranaghat-Chakdaha Plain. The east forms the boundary with Bangladesh. The subdivision is moderately urbanized. 20.795% of the population lives in urban areas and 79.205% lives in rural areas.

Note: The map alongside presents some of the notable locations in the subdivision. All places marked in the map are linked in the larger full screen map. All the four subdivisions are presented with maps on the same scale – the size of the maps vary as per the area of the subdivision.

== Demographics ==
According to the 2011 Census of India, Chapra had a total population of 14,123, of which 7,161 (51%) were males and 6,962 (49%) were females. Population in the age range 0–6 years was 1,436. The total number of literate persons in Chapra was 10,086 (79.50% of the population over 6 years).

== Civic administration ==
=== Police station ===
Chapra police station has jurisdiction over the Chapra CD block. The total area covered by the police station is 306 km^{2} and the population covered is 270,541 (2001 census). 37.5 km of India-Bangladesh border is part of this police station area.

=== CD block HQ ===
The headquarters of Chapra community development block are located at Chapra.

== Education ==
There is a college named Chapra Bangaljhi Mahavidyalaya, was established at Bangaljhi in 2001. Affiliated to the University of Kalyani, it offers honours courses in Bengali, English, Sanskrit, history, geography, political science, philosophy, education and sociology. Hat Chapra King Edward High School is one of the oldest school in the district situated at Chapra.

== Transport ==
State Highway 11, running from Mahammad Bazar (in Birbhum district) to Ranaghat (in Nadia district), passes through this town.

== Infrastructure ==
According to the District Census Handbook 2011, Nadia, Chapra covered an area of 4.1232 km^{2}. Among the civic amenities, it had 5.25 km roads with both open and closed drains, the protected water supply involved BWT, tubewell, borewell. It had 2,057 domestic electric connections. Among the medical facilities it had 1 dispensary/ health centre, 1 family welfare centre, 1 nursing home, 1 charitable hospital/ nursing home, 4 medicine shops. Among the educational facilities it had were 5 primary schools, 1 middle school, 1 secondary school, 1 senior secondary school. It had 3 non-formal education centres (Sarva Siksha Abhiyan). Among the social, recreational and cultural facilities, it had 1 public library. Three important items it produced were mustard oil, steel almirah, leather bags. It had the branch offices of 1 nationalised bank, 1 cooperative bank, 1 agricultural credit society and 1 non-agricultural credit society.
