= Tehatta II =

- Community development block
- Coordinates: 23.7833330°N 88.4500000°E
- Country: India
- State: West Bengal
- District: Nadia

Government
  - Type: Community development block

Area
  - Total: 172.47 km^{2} (66.59 sq mi)
- Elevation: 13 m (43 ft)

Population (2011)
  - Total: 151,231
  - Density: 876.85/km^{2} (2,271.0/sq mi)

Languages
  - Official: Bengali, English

Literacy (2011)
  - Total literates: 91,926 (68.52%)
- Time zone: UTC+5:30 (IST)
- PIN: 741155 (Palashipara); 741156 (Plassey)
- Telephone/STD code: 03474
- Vehicle registration: WB-51,WB-52
- Lok Sabha constituency: Krishnanagar
- Vidhan Sabha constituency: Palashipara
- Website: nadia.nic.in

Tehatta II is a community development block that forms an administrative division in Tehatta subdivision of Nadia district in the Indian state of West Bengal.

== Geography ==
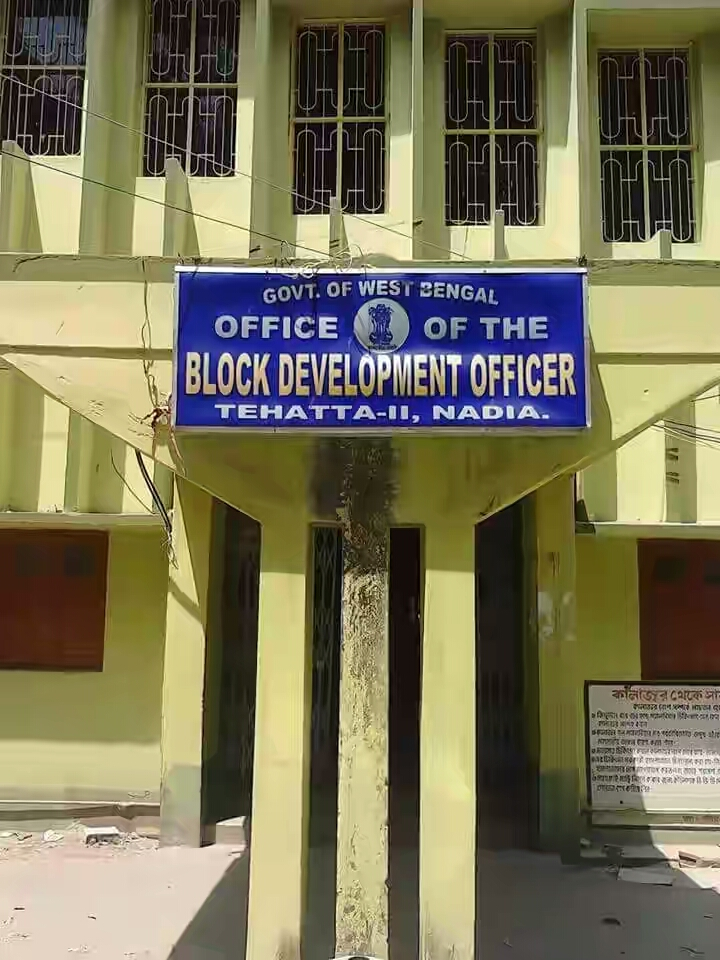
Tehatta II CD block office

Palashipara, the police station and headquarters of Tehatta II CD Block, is located at 23°47′00″N 88°27′00″E.

Tehatta II CD Block is bounded by Naoda, CD Block in Murshidabad district, and Karimpur II CD Block, in the north, Tehatta I CD Block in the east, Nakashipara CD Block in the south and Kaliganj CD Block in the west.

Palashipara is about 18 km from Plassey, where the historic Battle of Plassey was fought in 1757. Jalangi River flows through region.

Nadia district is mostly alluvial plains lying to the east of Hooghly River, locally known as the Bhagirathi. The alluvial plains are cut across by such distributaries as the Jalangi, Churni and Ichamati. With these rivers getting silted up, floods are a recurring feature.

Tehatta II CD Block has an area of 172.47 km^{2}. It has 1 panchayat samity, 7 gram panchayats, 112 gram sansads (village councils), 34 mouzas and 32 inhabited villages. Tehatta police station serves this block. Headquarters of this CD Block is at Palashipara.

Gram panchayats of Tehatta II block & panchayat samiti are Barnia, Gopinathpur, Hanspukuria, Palashipara, Polsunda I, Polsunda II and Sahebnagar.

== Demographics ==
=== Population ===
As per the 2011 Census of India, Tehatta II CD Block had a population of 151,231, all of which were rural. There were 77,299 (51%) males and 73,932 (49%) females. The population below 6 years was 17, 071. Scheduled Castes numbered 25,085 (16.59%) and Scheduled Tribes numbered 2,092 (1.38%).

As per the 2001 census, Tehatta II block had a total population 134,113, out of which 68,737 were males and 65,376 were females. Tehatta II block registered a population growth of 16.96 per cent during the 1991-2001 decade. Decadal growth for the district was 19.51 per cent. Decadal growth in West Bengal was 17.84 per cent.

Large villages (with 4,000+ population) in Tehatta II CD Block were (2011 census figures in brackets): Dhwapara (6,667), Baraia (7,746), Baruipara (8,077), Palsunda (11,791), Bara Naldaha (6,537), Chhoto Naldaha (4,437), Panchdara Abhaynagar (9,803), Barnia (16,350), Hanspukuria (8,023), Natipota (6,860), Palashipara (10,693), Radhanagar (4,345), Gopinathpur (8,910) and Rudranagar (4,694).

Other villages in Tehatta II CD Block include (2011 census figures in brackets): Sahebnagar (3,468) and Iswarchandrapur (2,471).

=== Literacy ===
As per the 2011 census, the total number of literates in Tehatta II CD Block was 91,926 (68.52% of the population over 6 years) out of which males numbered 48,752 (70.93% of the male population over 6 years) and females numbered 43,174 (65.99% of the female population over 6 years). The gender disparity (the difference between female and male literacy rates) was 4.94%.

See also – List of West Bengal districts ranked by literacy rate

Literacy in CD blocks of
Nadia district
Tehatta subdivision
Karimpur I – 67.70%
Karimpur II – 62.04%
Tehatta I – 70.72%
Tehatta II – 68.52%
Krishnanagar Sadar subdivision
Kaliganj – 65.89%
Nakashipara – 64.86%
Chapra – 68.25%
Krishnanagar I – 71.45%
Krishnanagar II – 68.52%
Nabadwip – 67.72%
Krishnaganj – 72.86%
Ranaghat subdivision
Hanskhali – 80.11%
Santipur – 73.10%
Ranaghat I – 77.61%
Ranaghat II – 79.38%
Kalyani subdivision
Chakdaha – 64.17%
Haringhata – 82.15%
Source: 2011 Census: CD Block Wise
Primary Census Abstract Data

=== Language and religion ===
Religion in Tehatta II CD block (2011)
Hinduism	51.00%
Islam	48.85%
Others or not stated	0.15%

In the 2011 census, Hindus numbered 77,128 and formed 51.00% of the population in Tehatta II CD Block. Muslims also numbered 73,876 and formed 48.85% of the population.

In the 2001 census, Hindus numbered 220,357 and formed 62.67% of the combined population of Tehatta I and Tehatta II CD Blocks. Muslims numbered 127,045 and formed 36.13% of the combined population. In the 1991 census, Hindus numbered 184,404 and formed 61.30% of the combined population of Tehatta I and Tehatta II CD Blocks. Muslims numbered 112,758 and formed 37.49% of the combined population.

Bengali is the predominant language, spoken by 99.71% of the population.

== Rural poverty ==
The District Human Development Report for Nadia has provided a CD Block-wise data table for Modified Human Vulnerability Index of the district. Tehatta II CD Block registered 29.69 on the MHPI scale. The CD Block-wise mean MHVI was estimated at 33.92. A total of 8 out of the 17 CD Blocks in Nadia district were found to be severely deprived when measured against the CD Block mean MHVI - Karimpur I and Karimpur II (under Tehatta subdivision), Kaliganj, Nakashipara, Chapra, Krishnanagar I and Nabadwip (under Krishnanagar Sadar subdivision) and Santipur (under Ranaghat subdivision) appear to be backward.

As per the Human Development Report 2004 for West Bengal, the rural poverty ratio in Nadia district was 28.35%. The estimate was based on Central Sample data of NSS 55th round 1999–2000.

== Economy ==
=== Livelihood ===
In Tehatta II CD Block in 2011, amongst the class of total workers, cultivators formed 30.84%, agricultural labourers 43.90%, household industry workers 1.85% and other workers 23.41%.

The southern part of Nadia district starting from Krishnanagar I down to Chakdaha and Haringhata has some urban pockets specialising in either manufacturing or service related economic activity and has reflected a comparatively higher concentration of population but the urban population has generally stagnated. Nadia district still has a large chunk of people living in the rural areas.

=== Infrastructure ===
There are 32 inhabited villages in Tehatta II CD Block. 100% villages have power supply and drinking water supply. 14 Villages (43.75%) have post offices. 31 villages (96.88%) have telephones (including landlines, public call offices and mobile phones). 23 villages (71.88%) have a pucca approach road and 19 villages (51.38%) have transport communication (includes bus service, rail facility and navigable waterways). 15 villages (46.88%) have agricultural credit societies and 7 villages (21.88%) have banks. Although 100% villages in Nadia district had power supply in 2011, a survey in 2007-08 revealed that less than 50% of households had electricity connection. In rural areas of the country, the tube well was for many years considered to be the provider of safe drinking water, but with arsenic contamination of ground water claiming public attention it is no longer so. Piped water supply is still a distant dream. In 2007–08, the availability of piped drinking water in Nadia district was as low as 8.6%, well below the state average of around 20%.

=== Agriculture ===
Persons engaged in agriculture
in Tehatta II CD Block
1. Bargadars (4.60%)
2. Patta holders (14.1%)
3. Small farmers (9.80%)
4. Marginal farmers (32.1%)
5. Agricultural labourers (39.4%)

Although the Bargadari Act of 1950 recognised the rights of bargadars to a higher share of crops from the land that they tilled, it was not implemented fully. Large tracts, beyond the prescribed limit of land ceiling, remained with the rich landlords. From 1977 onwards major land reforms took place in West Bengal. Land in excess of land ceiling was acquired and distributed amongst the peasants. Following land reforms land ownership pattern has undergone transformation. In 2013–14, persons engaged in agriculture in Tehatta II CD Block could be classified as follows: bargadars 4.60%, patta (document) holders 14.11%, small farmers (possessing land between 1 and 2 hectares) 9.80%, marginal farmers (possessing land up to 1 hectare) 32.07% and agricultural labourers 39.43%. As the proportion of agricultural labourers is very high, the real wage in the agricultural sector has been a matter of concern.

Tehatta II CD Block had 212 fertiliser depots, 5 seed stores and 56 fair price shops in 2013–14.

In 2013–14, Tehatta II CD Block produced 5,313 tonnes of Aman paddy, the main winter crop from 2,038 hectares, 8,311 tonnes of Boro paddy (spring crop) from 2,171 hectares, 5,240 tonnes of Aus paddy (summer crop) from 2,652 hectares, 14,997 tonnes of wheat from 3,896 hectares, 161,764 tonnes of jute from 9,792 hectares, 5,466 tonnes of potatoes from 181 hectares and 9,422 tonnes of sugar cane from 94 hectares. It also produced pulses and oilseeds.

In 2013–14, the total area irrigated in Tehatta II CD Block was 1,745 hectares, out of which 1,239 hectares were irrigated by river lift irrigation, 422 hectares by deep tube wells and 84 hectares by deep tube well.

=== Banking ===
In 2013–14, Tehatta II CD Block had offices of 2 commercial banks and 4 gramin banks.

== Transport ==
Tehatta II CD Block has 6 ferry services and 4 originating/ terminating bus routes. The nearest railway station is 18 km from CD Block headquarters.

SH 14 originates from Betai in this block and runs to Dubrajpur (in Birbhum district).

== Education ==
In 2013–14, Tehatta II CD Block had 83 primary schools with 7,307 students, 2 middle schools with 306 students, 3 high school with 2,636 students and 9 higher secondary schools with 16,320 students. Tehatta II CD Block had 2 technical/ professional institutions with 205 students and 224 institutions for special and non-formal education with 11,518 students

In Tehatta II CD Block, amongst the 32 inhabited villages, 2 had no school, 24 had more than 1 primary school, 12 had at least 1 primary school, 18 had at least 1 primary and 1 middle school and 12 had at least 1 middle and 1 secondary school.

== Healthcare ==
In 2014, Tehatta II CD Block had 1 block primary health centre, 2 primary health centres and 3 private nursing homes with total 65 beds and 9 doctors (excluding private bodies). It had 18 family welfare subcentres. 4,232 patients were treated indoor and 280,192 patients were treated outdoor in the hospitals, health centres and subcentres of the CD Block.

Palashipara (Pritimoyee) Rural Hospital, with 30 beds at Palashipara, is the major government medical facility in the Tehatta II CD block. There are primary health centres at Barnia (with 10 beds) and Chhota Nalda (with 6 beds).

Tehatta II CD Block is one of the areas of Nadia district where ground water is affected by high level of arsenic contamination. The WHO guideline for arsenic in drinking water is 10 mg/ litre, and the Indian Standard value is 50 mg/ litre. All the 17 blocks of Nadia district have arsenic contamination above this level. The maximum concentration in Tehatta II CD Block is 950 mg/litre.

== Culture ==
Attractions in the area are – Sonargouranga temple (with the golden statue of Chaitanya Mahaprabhu), Chandroday temple and a church. A famous and oldest indigo Kuthi is situated near 3 km at Nishcintapur in demolished form.
