= Palashipara =

- Village
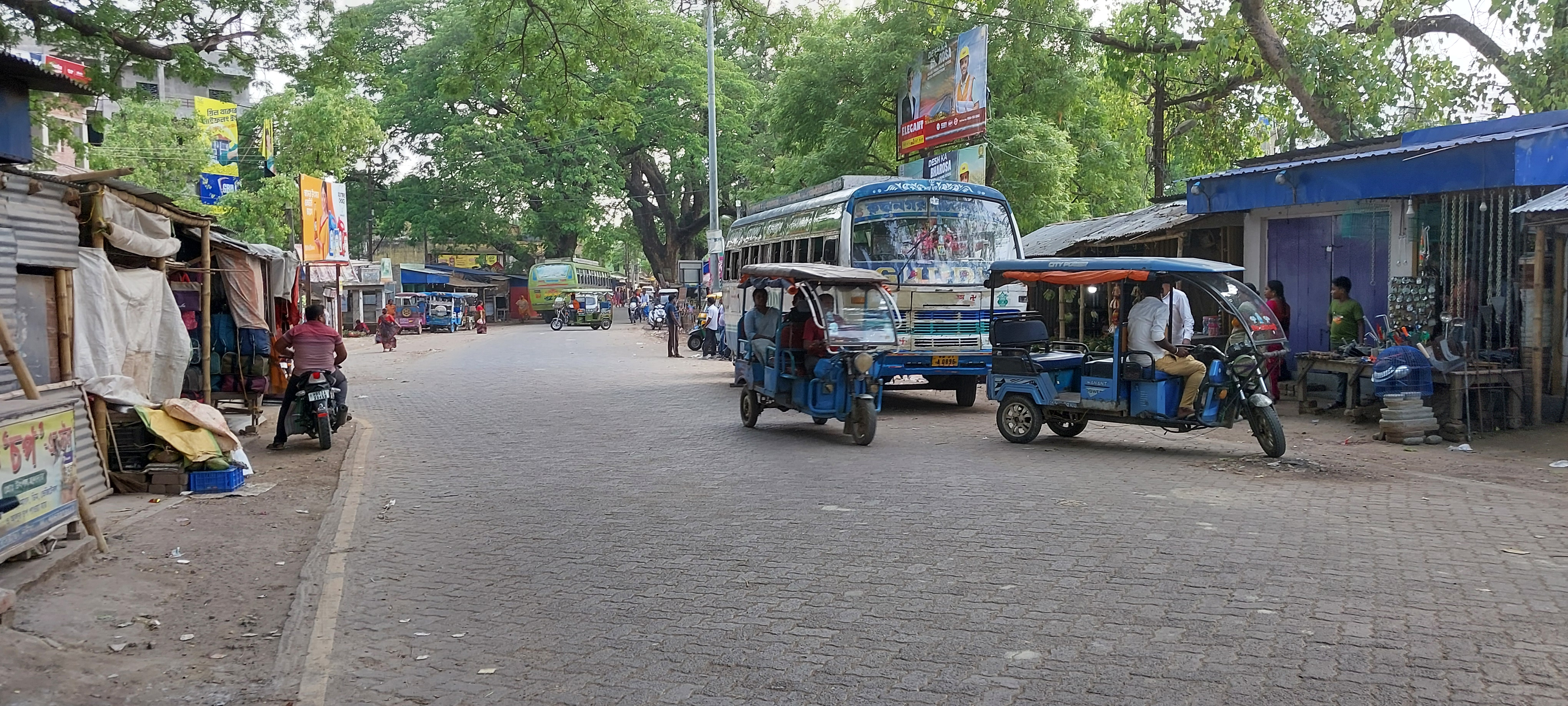
- Palasahipara Bus stand

- Location within West Bengal Location within India
- Coordinates: 23°47′0″N 88°27′0″E
- Country: India
- State: West Bengal
- District: Nadia

Population (2011)
  - Total: 10,693
- Pin: 741155

Palashipara, is a village in the Tehatta II CD block in Tehatta subdivision of the Nadia district, West Bengal, India.

== History ==
During the time between Maratha invasions of Bengal by Bargis and Battle of Plassey, local people migrated to a different place to avoid social, political turmoil and form a new human settlement. According to the etymology para (locality) of the inhabitants of Palashi (Palashi) set up here. Palashipara is an old village situated in the bank of Jalangi River. An indigo kuthi was established by the indigo planters at Nishchintapur village near Palashipara. Before the Partition of Bengal (1947) this place was under Meherpur subdivision in British India.

== Geography ==
Cities and towns in Tehatta subdivision of Nadia district
CT: census town, R: rural/ urban centre.
Owing to space constraints in the small map, the actual locations in a larger map may vary slightly

=== Location ===
Palashipara is located at 23°47′0″N 88°27′0″E.

=== Area overview ===
Nadia district is mostly alluvial plains lying to the east of Hooghly River, locally known as Bhagirathi. The alluvial plains are cut across by such distributaries as Jalangi, Churni and Ichhamati. With these rivers getting silted up, floods are a recurring feature. The Tehatta subdivision, presented in the map alongside, is topographically part of the Nadia Plain North. The Jalangi River forms the district/ subdivision border in the north-western part and then flows through the subdivision. The other important rivers are Mathabhanga and Bhairab. The eastern portion forms the boundary with Bangladesh. The subdivision is overwhelmingly rural. 97.15% of the population lives in the rural areas and 2.85% lives in the urban areas.

Note: The map alongside presents some of the notable locations in the subdivision. All places marked in the map are linked in the larger full screen map. All the four subdivisions are presented with maps on the same scale – the size of the maps vary as per the area of the subdivision.

== Demographics ==
According to the 2011 Census of India, Palashipara had a total population of 10,693, of which 5,434 (51%) were males and 5,259 (49%) were females. Population in the age range 0–6 years was 955. The total number of literate persons in Palashipara was 7,911 (81.24% of the population over 6 years).

== Civic administration ==
=== Police station ===
Palashipara police station serves Tehatta II subdivision.

=== CD block HQ ===
The headquarters of Tehatta II CD block are located at Palashipara.

== Education ==
There are two high schools at Palashipara. Palashipara Mahatma Gandhi Smriti Vidyapith known as MGS vidyapith is situated here. Another Higher Secondary school Palashipara Mahatma Gandhi Smriti Balika Vidyalaya is the schools for girls', providing 10+2 education to the locals. There are few primary schools in the locality.

== Transport ==
Palashipara is connected by bus with district headquarters Krishnagar. Nearest Plassey railway station at Plassey is almost 18 km from Palashipara. The connector of National Highway 34 (India) and State highway 11 passed through the village. A bridge named Dwijendralal Setu was made in 1971 over the Jalangi river on the way of the connector.

== Palashipara picture gallery ==
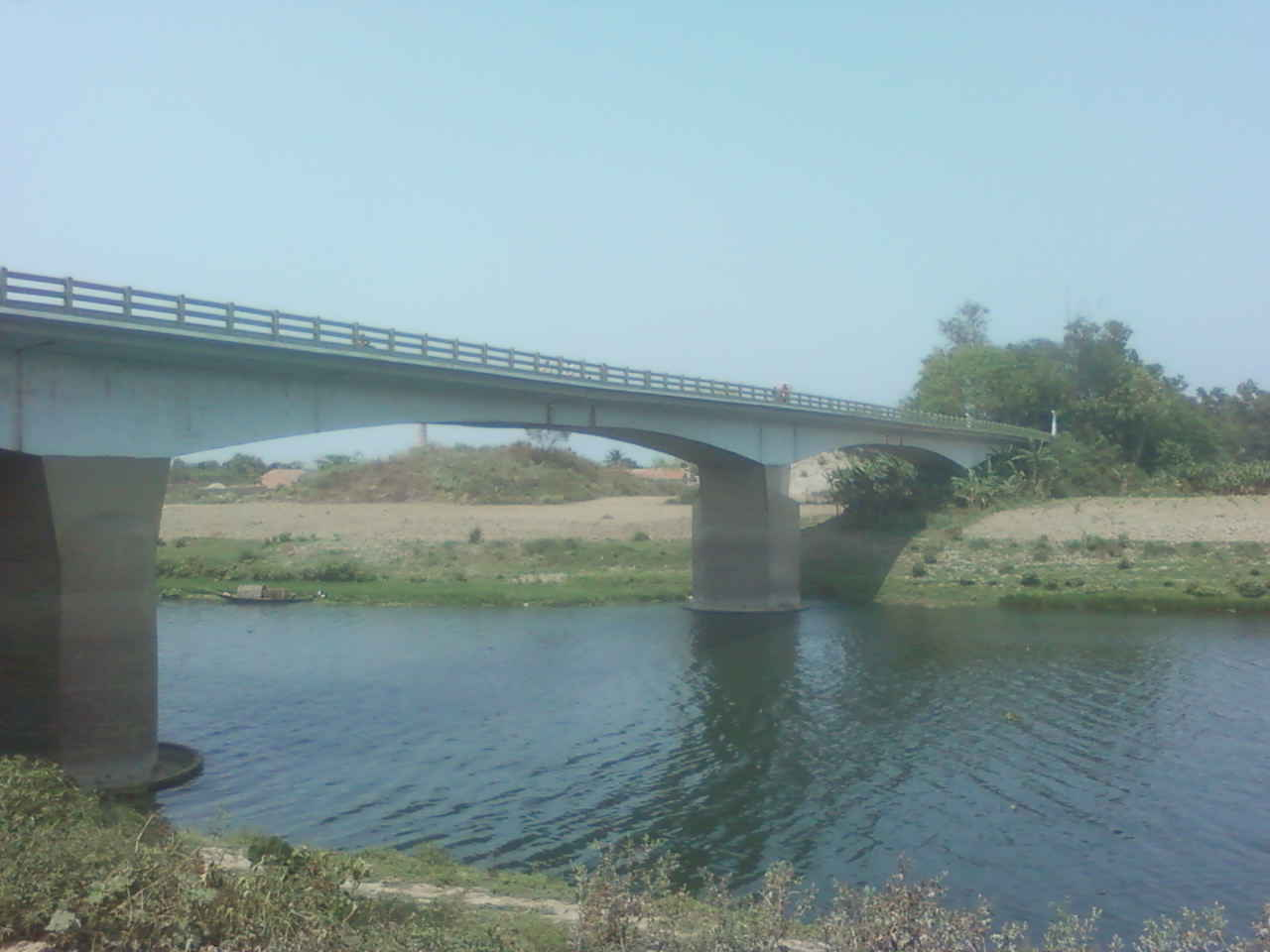
Dwijendralal Bridge over the Jalangi river, Palashipara

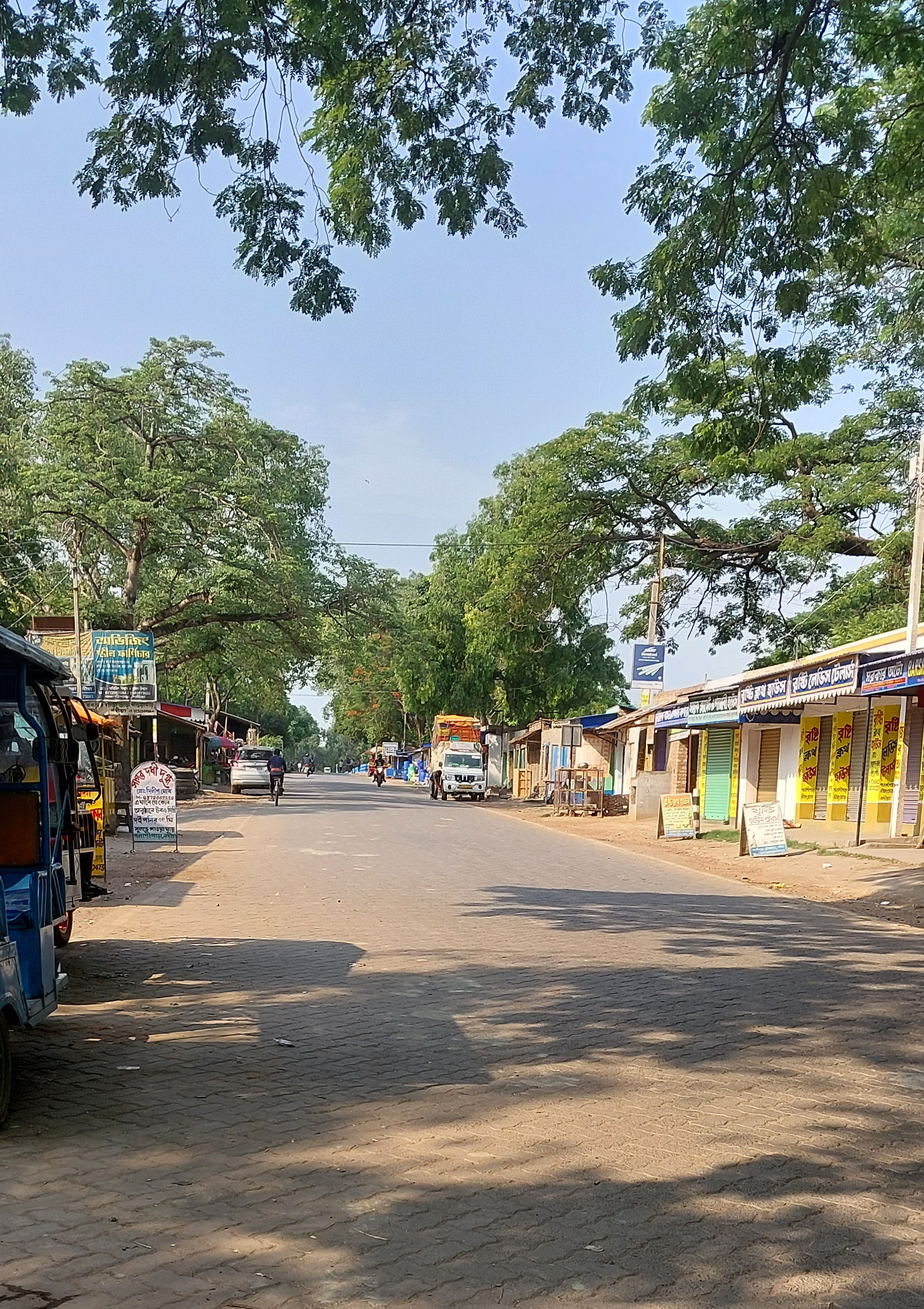
Betai-Plassey road at Palashipara

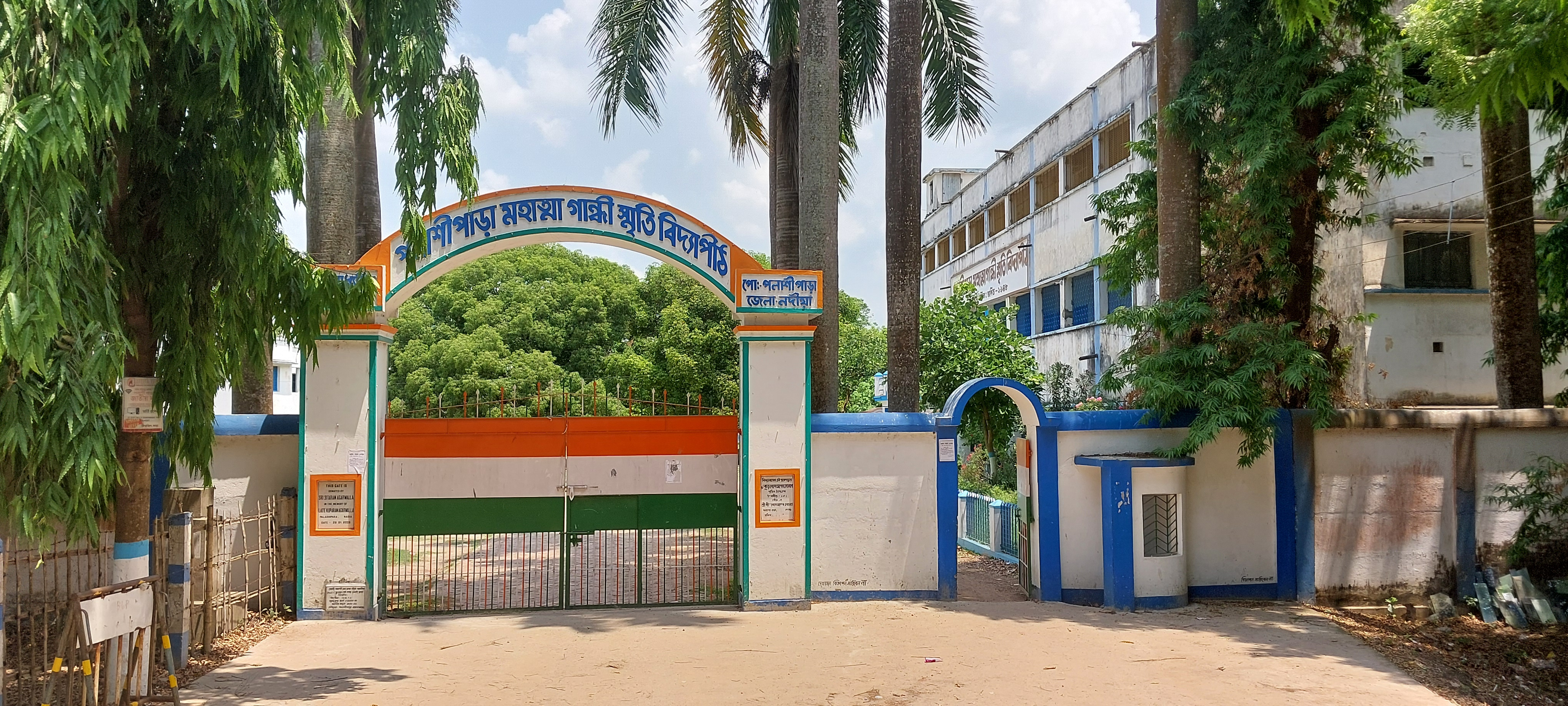
Palashipara Mahatma Gandhi Smriti Vidyapith

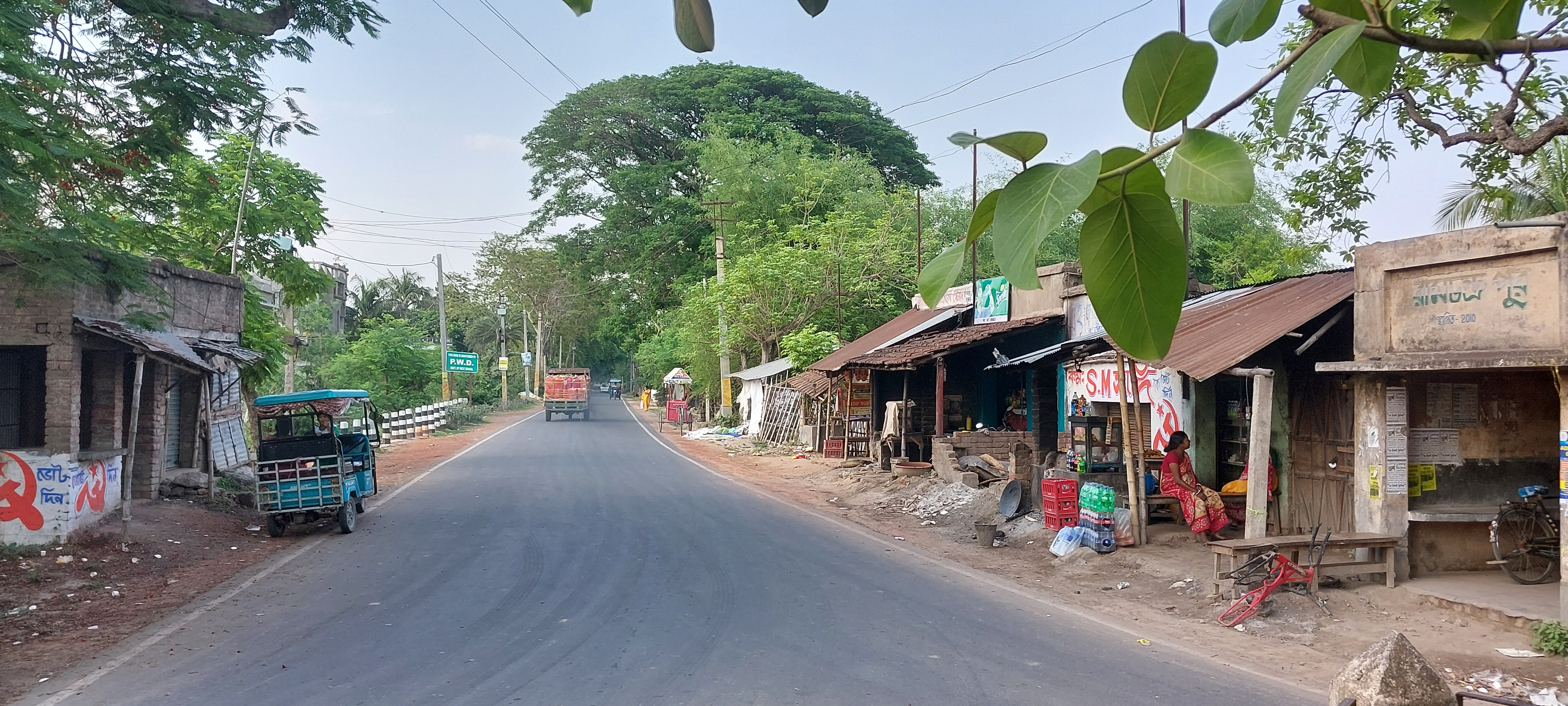
Radhanagar more, Palashipara
