= Krishnanagar Lok Sabha constituency =

Lok Sabha constituency in West Bengal

Coordinates: 23°24′N 88°30′E

Krishnanagar WB-12
- Lok Sabha constituency
- Interactive Map Outlining Krishnanagar Lok Sabha Constituency

Constituency details
- Country: India
- Region: East India
- State: West Bengal
- Assembly constituencies: Tehatta; Palashipara; Kaliganj; Nakashipara; Chapra; Krishnanagar Uttar; Krishnanagar Dakshin
- Established: 1967
- Total electors: 17,55,631 (2024)
- Reservation: None

Member of Parliament
- 18th Lok Sabha
- Incumbent Mahua Moitra
- Party: MAITC
- Alliance: INDIA
- Elected year: 2024

Krishnanagar Lok Sabha constituency is one of the 42 Lok Sabha (parliamentary) constituencies in West Bengal state in eastern India. All the seven assembly segments of No. 12 Krishnanagar Lok Sabha constituency are in Nadia district.

== Assembly segments ==
Parliamentary constituencies in West Bengal - 1. Cooch Behar, 2. Alipurduars, 3. Jalpaiguri, 4. Darjeeling, 5. Raiganj, 6. Balurghat, 7. Maldaha Uttar, 8. Maldaha Dakshin, 9. Jangipur, 10. Baharampur, 11. Murshidabad, 12. Krishnanagar, 13. Ranaghat, 14. Bangaon, 15. Barrackpore, 16. Dum Dum, 17. Barasat, 18. Basirhat, 19. Jaynagar, 20. Mathurapur, 21. Diamond Harbour, 22. Jadavpur, 23. Kolkata Dakshin, 24. Kolkata Uttar, 25. Howrah, 26. Uluberia, 27. Serampore, 28. Hooghly, 29. Arambagh, 30. Tamluk, 31, Kanthi, 32. Ghatal, 33. Jhargram, 34. Medinipur, 35. Purulia, 36. Bankura, 37. Bishnupur, 38. Bardhaman Purba, 39. Bardhaman Durgapur, 40. Asansol, 41. Bolpur, 42. Birbhum

As per order of the Delimitation Commission in respect of the delimitation of parliamentary constituencies in West Bengal, parliamentary constituency no. 12 Krishnanagar comprises the following segments from 2009:

#	Name	District	Member	Party	2024 Lead
78	Tehatta	Nadia	Subrata Kabiraj	BJP	BJP
79	Palashipara	Nadia	Rukbanur Rahman	AITC	AITC
80	Kaliganj	Nadia	Alifa Ahmed	AITC	AITC
81	Nakashipara	Nadia	Shantanu Dey	BJP	AITC
82	Chapra	Nadia	Jeber Sekh	AITC	AITC
83	Krishnanagar Uttar	Nadia	Tarak Nath Chatterjee	BJP	BJP
85	Krishnanagar Dakshin	Nadia	Sadhan Ghosh	BJP	BJP

In 2004, Krishnanagar Lok Sabha constituency was composed of the following assembly segments:Palashipara (assembly constituency no. 70), Nakshipara (assembly constituency no. 71), Kaliganj (assembly constituency no. 72), Chapra (assembly constituency no. 73), Krishnaganj (SC) (assembly constituency no. 74), Krishnanagar East (assembly constituency no. 75), Krishnanagar West (assembly constituency no. 76)

== Members of Parliament ==
Year	Member	Party
1967	Haripada Chattopadhyay	Independent
1967^	Ila Pal Choudhury	Indian National Congress
1971	Renu Pada Das	Communist Party of India (Marxist)
1977	Renu Pada Das	Communist Party of India (Marxist)
1980	Renu Pada Das	Communist Party of India (Marxist)
1984	Renu Pada Das	Communist Party of India (Marxist)
1991	Ajoy Mukhopadhyay	Communist Party of India (Marxist)
1996	Ajoy Mukhopadhyay	Communist Party of India (Marxist)
1998	Ajoy Mukhopadhyay	Communist Party of India (Marxist)
1999	Satyabrata Mookherjee	Bharatiya Janata Party
2004	Jyotirmoyee Sikdar	Communist Party of India (Marxist)
2009	Tapas Paul	Trinamool Congress
2014	Tapas Paul	Trinamool Congress
2019	Mahua Moitra	Trinamool Congress
2024	Mahua Moitra	Trinamool Congress

^ denotes by election

== Election results ==
=== General election 2024 ===
2024 Indian general elections: Krishnanagar
Party	Candidate	Votes	%	±%
AITC	Mahua Moitra	628,789	44.10	▼0.90
BJP	Amrita Roy	572,084	40.13	▼0.24
CPI(M)	S. M. Saadi	180,201	12.64	▲3.84
NOTA	None of the above	6,811	0.48	
Majority		56,705	3.97	▼0.66
Turnout		1,425,712	80.65	▼3.10
AITC hold		Swing		

=== General election 2019 ===
2019 Indian general elections: Krishnanagar
Party	Candidate	Votes	%	±%
AITC	Mahua Moitra	614,872	45.00	▲10.14
BJP	Kalyan Chaubey	551,654	40.37	▲13.99
CPI(M)	Dr. Santanu Jha	120,222	8.80	▼20.63
INC	Intaz Ali Shah	38,305	2.80	▼3.19
Majority		63,218	4.63	▼1.08
Turnout		13,66,601	83.75	▼0.75
AITC hold		Swing	▲10.14	

=== General election 2014 ===
2014 Indian general elections: Krishnanagar
Party	Candidate	Votes	%	±%
AITC	Tapas Paul	438,789	35.14	−7.29
CPI(M)	Santanu Jha	3,67,534	29.43	−5.60
BJP	Satyabrata Mookherjee	3,29,873	26.38	+9.62
INC	Razia Ahmed	74,789	5.99	
NOTA	None of the Above	7,642	0.61	−−−
Majority		71,255	5.71	−1.69
Turnout		12,47,914	84.50	
AITC hold		Swing		

=== General election 2009 ===
General Election, 2009: Krishnanagar
Party	Candidate	Votes	%	±%
AITC	Tapas Paul	443,679	42.43	
CPI(M)	Jyotirmoyee Sikdar	366,293	35.03	
BJP	Satyabrata Mookherjee	175,283	16.76	
AUDF	Md. Niamatullah Mollick	19,313		
CPI(ML)L	Subimal Sengupta	14,480		
BSP	Debabrata Majumder	10,733		
IUML	Shahjahan Mallik	6,592		
SP	Jayasri Chakrabarty	5,002		
NCP	Sk. Daulat Hossain	4,336		
Majority		77,386		
Turnout		10,45,711	85.50	
AITC gain from CPI(M)		Swing		

=== General elections 1967-2004 ===
Most of the contests were multi-cornered. However, only winners and runners-up are mentioned below:

Year	Voters	Voter turnout	Winner			Runners up		
		%age	Candidate	%age	Party	Candidate	%age	Party
1967	343,935	74.00	Haridas Chattopadhyay	47.52	Independent	C.P.Mukherjee	37.48	Congress
1971	312,342	62.05	Renupada Das	36.96	CPI(M)	Ila Pal Chaudhuri	25.55	Congress
1977	331,370	61.96	Renupada Das	61.86	CPI(M)	Shibsankar Bandopadhyay	33.43	Congress
1980	515,990	79.71	Renupada Das	50.81	CPI(M)	Sankar Das Banerji	36.74	Congress
1984	611,950	83.74	Renupada Das	49.25	CPI(M)	Sankar Das Banerji	48.45	Congress
1989	761,990	82.69	Ajoy Mukherjee	46.31	CPI(M)	Jyotirmoy Bhattacharya	44.14	Congress
1991	764,560	82.34	Ajoy Mukherjee	43.33	CPI(M)	Jyotirmoy Bhattacharya	35.37	Congress
1996	911,620	85.2	Ajoy Mukherjee	45.94	CPI(M)	Jyotirmoy Bhattacharya	41.56	Congress
1998	897,930	84.07	Ajoy Mukherjee	42.03	CPI(M)	Satyabrata Mookherjee	37.44	BJP
1999	845,490	77.96	Satyabrata Mookherjee	43.82	BJP	Dilip Chakraborty	41.16	CPI(M)
2004	930,290	83.25	Jyotirmoyee Sikdar	42.73	CPI(M)	Satyabrata Mookherjee	40.54	BJP

== See also ==
- Krishnagar
- List of constituencies of the Lok Sabha
