= Subrata Kabiraj =

Indian politician in West Bengal

Member of the West Bengal
- Incumbent
- Assumed office 4 May 2026
- Preceded by: Tapas Kumar Saha
- Constituency: Tehatta

Personal details
- Party: Bharatiya Janata Party
- Profession: Politician

Subrata Kabiraj is an Indian politician from West Bengal. He is a member of West Bengal Legislative Assembly, elected from Tehatta Assembly constituency in 2026 West Bengal Legislative Assembly election.
