= S. M. Saadi =

Indian politician

Member of West Bengal Legislative Assembly
- In office 2011–2016
- Preceded by: Biswanath Ghosh
- Succeeded by: Tapas Kumar Saha
- Constituency: Palashipara

Personal details
- Party: Communist Party of India (Marxist)

S. M. Saadi is an Indian politician from the Communist Party of India (Marxist).

== Early life and family ==
Saadi was born in c. 1960 to a Bengali family of Muslims in Nadia district. He was the son of late Wadudur Rahman.

== Career ==
Saadi was a member of the West Bengal Legislative Assembly from 2011 to 2016 elected from Palashipara.
