= Rukbanur Rahman =

Indian politician

Member of West Bengal Legislative Assembly
- Incumbent
- Assumed office 2026
- Preceded by: Manik Bhattacharya
- Constituency: Palashipara
- In office 2011–2026
- Preceded by: Shamsul Islam Mollah
- Succeeded by: Jeber Sekh
- Constituency: Chapra

Personal details
- Born: 22 February 1968 (age 58)
- Party: Trinamool Congress (until 2026); Democratic Trinamool Congress (from 2026)
- Relatives: Rizwanur Rahman (brother)

Rukbanur Rahman is an Indian politician. In 2011, 2016 and 2021 he was elected as a Member of the West Bengal Legislative Assembly from Chapra constituency for three consecutive terms. In 2026 he was elected from Palashipara for his fourth term. He is a Trinamool Congress politician.

He is the brother of Rizwanur Rahman, a graphics designer who died under suspicious circumstances.
