= Palashipara Assembly constituency =

Palashipara
- Constituency No. 79 for the West Bengal Legislative Assembly
- Interactive Map Outlining Palashipara Assembly Constituency

Constituency details
- Country: India
- Region: East India
- State: West Bengal
- District: Nadia
- Lok Sabha constituency: Krishnanagar
- Established: 1977
- Total electors: 244,867
- Reservation: None

Member of Legislative Assembly
- 18th West Bengal Legislative Assembly
- Incumbent Rukbanur Rahman
- Party: Democratic Trinamool Congress
- Elected year: 2026

Palashipara Assembly constituency is an assembly constituency in Nadia district in the Indian state of West Bengal.

== Overview ==
As per orders of the Delimitation Commission, No. 79 Palashipara Assembly constituency is composed of the following: Chanderghat and Patharghata II gram panchayats of Tehatta I CD Block, Tehatta II CD Block, and Bikrampur, Bilkumari, Dhananjaypur and Haranagar gram panchayats of Nakashipara CD Block.

Palashipara Assembly constituency is part of 12. Krishnanagar Lok Sabha Constituency.

== Members of the Legislative Assembly ==
Year	Name	Party
1977	Madhabendu Mahanta	Communist Party of India (Marxist)
1982	Madhabendu Mahanta	Communist Party of India (Marxist)
1987	Madhabendu Mahanta	Communist Party of India (Marxist)
1991	Kamalendu Sanyal	Communist Party of India (Marxist)
1996	Kamalendu Sanyal	Communist Party of India (Marxist)
2001	Kamalendu Sanyal	Communist Party of India (Marxist)
2006	Biswanath Ghosh	Communist Party of India (Marxist)
2011	S. M. Saadi	Communist Party of India (Marxist)
2016	Tapas Kumar Saha	All India Trinamool Congress
2021	Manik Bhattacharya	All India Trinamool Congress
2026	Rukbanur Rahman	All India Trinamool Congress

For MLAs in the area prior to 1977 see Tehatta Assembly constituency

== Election results ==
=== 2026 ===
2026 West Bengal Legislative Assembly election: Palashipara
Party	Candidate	Votes	%	±%
AITC	Rukbanur Rahman	89,241	41.58	−12.64
BJP	Anima Dutta	77,787	36.24	+7.26
Indian Secular Front	Samsur Ali Mallick	34,584	16.11	
AJUP	Haydar Ali Mondal	3,399	1.58	
INC	Hamidul Haque	3,021	1.41	
SUCI(C)	Anarul Haque Sk	2,224	1.04	
NOTA	None of the above	2,048	0.95	+0.14
Majority		11,454	5.34	−19.9
Turnout		214,650	92.25	+9.19
AITC hold		Swing		

=== 2021 ===
West Bengal assembly elections, 2021: Palashipara constituency
Party	Candidate	Votes	%	±%
AITC	Manik Bhattacharya	110,274	54.22	
BJP	Bibhas Chandra Mandal	58,938	28.98	
CPI(M)	S. M. Saadi	26,228	12.90	
NOTA	None of the above	1,654	0.81	
Majority		51,336	25.24	
Turnout		203,385	83.06	
AITC hold		Swing		

=== 2016 ===
In the 2016 election, Tapas Kumar Saha of AITMC defeated previous M.L.A. S. M. Saadi of CPI(M)

West Bengal assembly elections, 2016: Palashipara constituency
Party	Candidate	Votes	%	±%
AITC	Tapas Kumar Saha	82,122	44.99	
CPI(M)	S. M. Saadi	76,568	41.94	
BJP	Bibhash Chandra Mandal	14,028	7.68	
SS	Monoj Roy	3,117	1.71	
SUCI(C)	Batshobha Sekh	2,571	1.41	
BSP	Dwijen Biswas	1,576	0.86	
SDPI	Fajlur Rahaman Sekh	583	0.32	
NOTA		1,990	1.09	
Turnout		182,560	83.67	
AITC gain from CPI(M)		Swing		

=== 2011 ===
In the 2011 election, S. M. Saadi of CPI(M) defeated his nearest rival Prof. Manik Bhattacharjee of All India Trinamool Congress

West Bengal assembly elections, 2011: Palashipara constituency
Party	Candidate	Votes	%	±%
CPI(M)	S. M. Saadi	73,619	46.12	−2.08
AITC	Prof. Manik Bhattacharya	71,967	45.09	−1.39#
BJP	Arjun Kumar Biswas	8,145	5.10	
BSP	Rati Kanta Thakur	2,480		
MLKSC	Shahjahan Mollick	1,896		
JD(U)	Jelhak Mahalder	1,513		
Turnout		159,620	86.11	
CPI(M) hold		Swing	-1.69#	

.# Swing calculated on Congress+Trinamool Congress vote percentages taken together in 2006.

=== 1977 ===
1977 West Bengal Legislative Assembly election: Nakashipara
Party	Candidate	Votes	%	±%
CPI(M)	Mir Fakir Mohammad	17,645	39.87	
JP	S. M. Badaruddin	6,921	15.64	
Independent	Toyadali Mondal	6,189	13.98	
Independent	Sandhya Rani Roy	4,498	10.16	
INC	Nil Kamal Sarkar	3,068	6.93	
Independent	Mritunjoy Singha Roy	2,177	4.92	
Independent	Mrityunjoy De	2,063	4.66	
Independent	Tarakeswar Das	929	2.10	
IUML	Gobinda Chandra Mondal	572	1.29	
Independent	Lakshman Mandal	194	0.44	
Majority		10,724	24.23	
Turnout		45,271	60.67	
CPI(M) win (new seat)				
