= Hat Chapra King Edward High School =

School in West Bengal

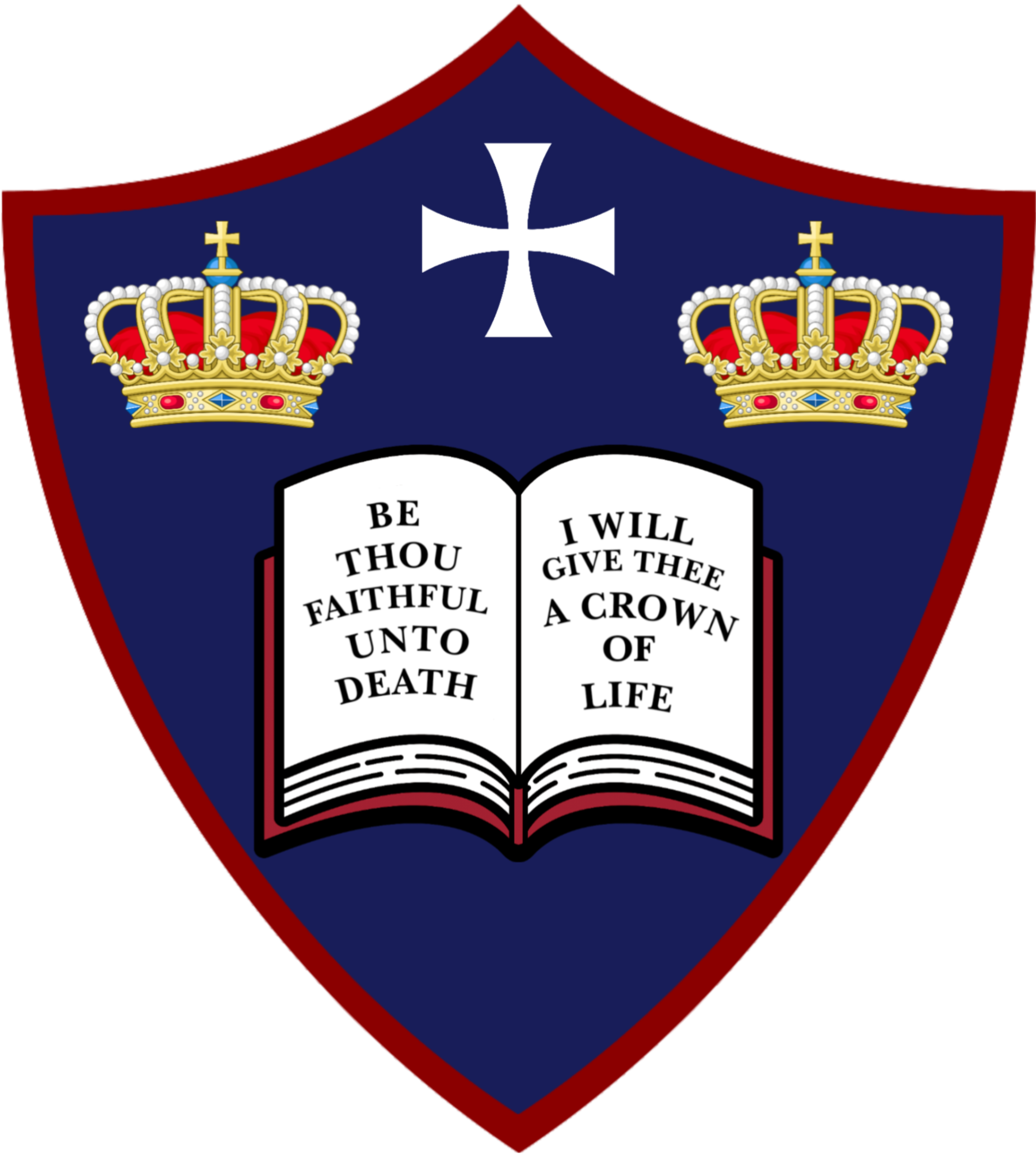

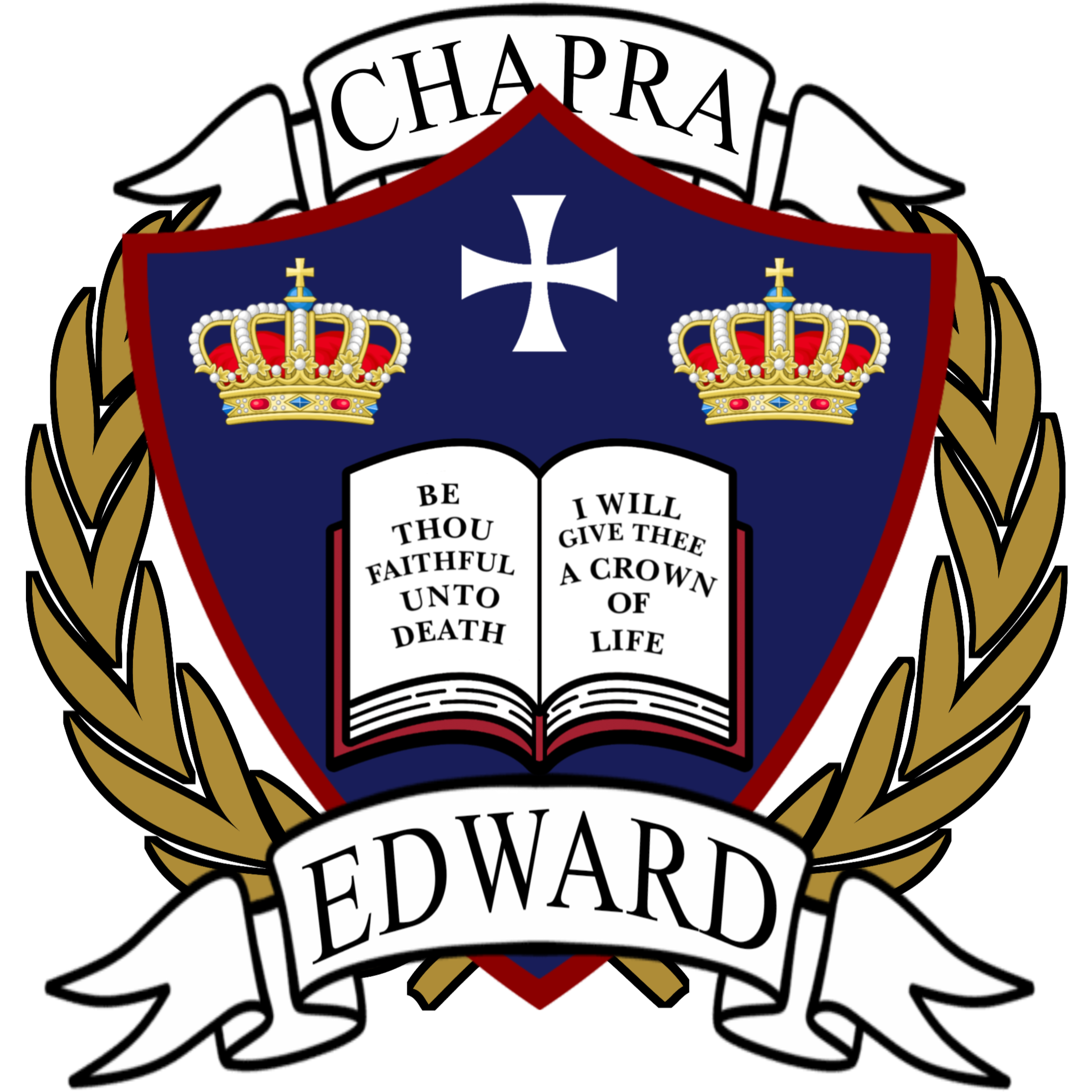
- Official Logo of Hat Chapra King Edward High School

Location
- Chapra, West Bengal; India; 23.523812°N 88.553689°E

Information
- Type: State-funded secondary school
- Motto: "Be Thou Faithful Unto Death, I Will Give Thee A Crown Of Life" (Revelation 2:10)
- Established: October 27, 1841; 184 years ago
- Founder: Church Missionary Society
- School district: Nadia
- Authority: West Bengal Board of Secondary Education
- Head teacher: Rev Nilanjan Biswas (H.M.)
- Language: Bengali
- Campus size: 6.3 acres (2.5 ha)
- Affiliation: West Bengal Council of Higher Secondary Education
- Website: hatchapra-ke-highschool.wbgov.in

Hat Chapra King Edward High School is one of the oldest co-educational high schools located in Bangaljhi, Chapra, in the Indian state of West Bengal. The school is managed by the Department of School Education. It was founded in 1841 by the Anglican Church Missionary Society (CMS) of England, making it a heritage institution of the region.

== History ==
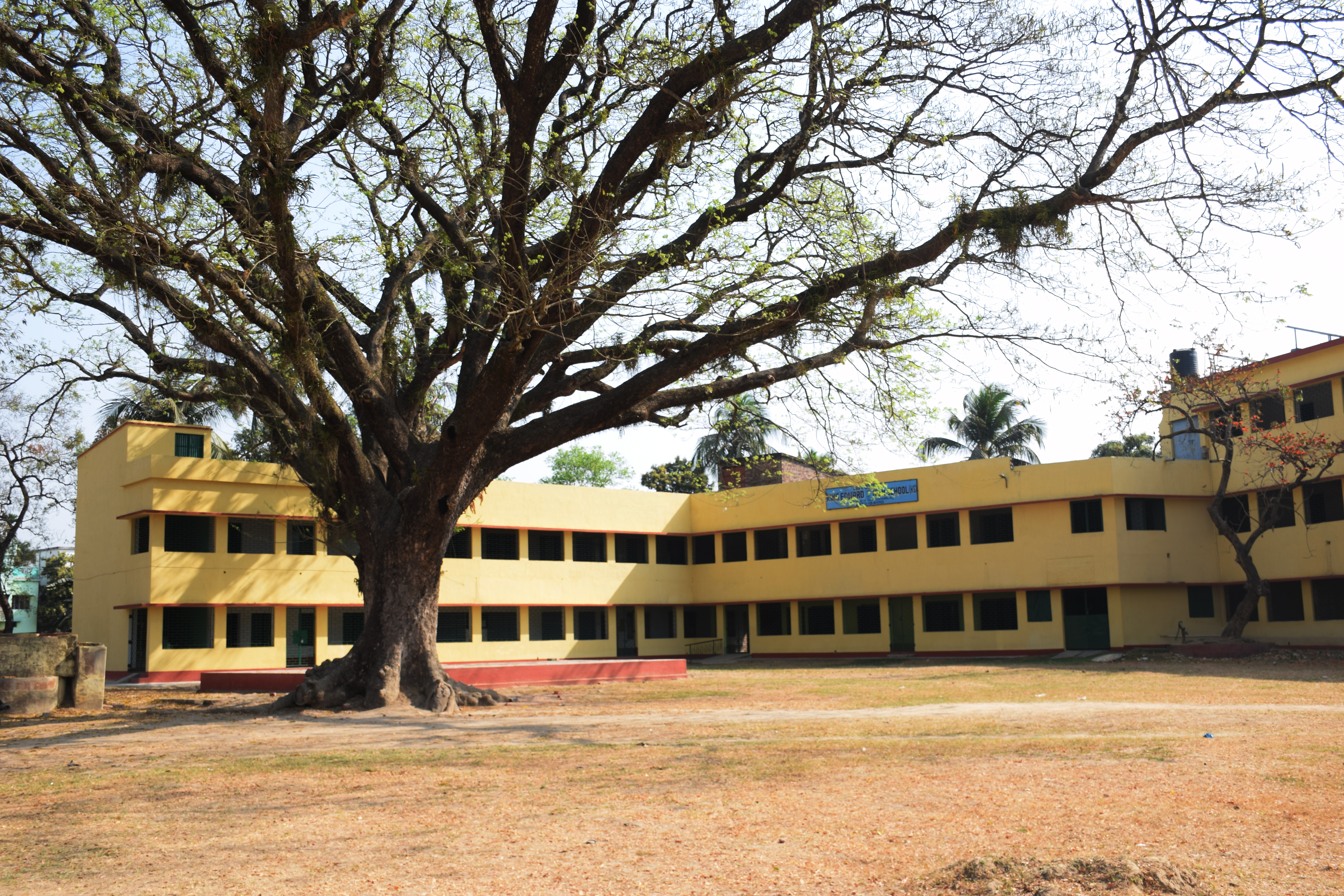
Hat Chapra King Edward High School main building

The school was originally established on 27 October 1841 by missionaries of the Church Missionary Society (CMS) to provide English and modern education in rural Bengal. It was named in honor of King Edward. Over the decades, it evolved from a missionary school into a leading state-funded institution, serving students across Nadia district.

== Campus ==
The school has a sprawling campus of approximately 6.3 acres, featuring the historic main school building, spacious classrooms, science laboratories, a library, and a large playground.

== See also ==
- Education in India
- List of schools in West Bengal
- Education in West Bengal
