= Chapra, West Bengal Assembly constituency =

Assembly constituency in West Bengal, India

Chapra
- Constituency No. 82 for the West Bengal Legislative Assembly
- Interactive Map Outlining Chapra Assembly Constituency

Constituency details
- Country: India
- Region: East India
- State: West Bengal
- District: Nadia
- Lok Sabha constituency: Krishnanagar
- Established: 1962
- Total electors: 248,014
- Reservation: None

Member of Legislative Assembly
- 18th West Bengal Legislative Assembly
- Incumbent Jeber Sekh
- Party: Democratic Trinamool Congress
- Elected year: 2026

Chapra Assembly constituency is an assembly constituency in Nadia district in the Indian state of West Bengal.

== Overview ==
As per orders of the Delimitation Commission, No. 82 Chapra Assembly constituency is composed of the following: Chapra community development block.

Chapra Assembly constituency is part of No. 12 Krishnanagar (Lok Sabha constituency).

== Members of the Legislative Assembly ==
Year	Name	Party
1962	Mohananda Haldar	Sanjukta Biplabi Parishad
1967	Jagannath Majumdar	Bangla Congress
1969	Salil Behari Hundle	Bangla Congress
1971	Sahabuddin Mondal	Communist Party of India (Marxist)
1972	Ghiasuddin Ahmad	Indian National Congress
1977	Sahabuddin Mondal	Communist Party of India (Marxist)
1982	Sahabuddin Mondal	Communist Party of India (Marxist)
1987	Mir Quasem Mondal	Communist Party of India (Marxist)
1991	Mir Quasem Mondal	Communist Party of India (Marxist)
1996	Mir Quasem Mondal	Communist Party of India (Marxist)
2001	Shamsul Islam Mollah	Communist Party of India (Marxist)
2006	Shamsul Islam Mollah	Communist Party of India (Marxist)
2011	Rukbanur Rahman	Trinamool Congress
2016	Rukbanur Rahman	Trinamool Congress
2021	Rukbanur Rahman	Trinamool Congress
2026	Jeber Sekh	Trinamool Congress

== Election results ==
=== 2026 ===
2026 West Bengal Legislative Assembly election: Chapra
Party	Candidate	Votes	%	±%
AITC	Jeber Sekh	97,085	46.06	▲11.41
BJP	Saikat Sarkar	66,305	31.46	▲4.17
Indian Secular Front	Jakir Hossain Mondal	38,437	18.24	▲16.43
INC	Asif Khan	2,015	0.96	
Independent	Shubhankar Rudra	1,836	0.87	
BSP	Sudhangshu Sarkar	1,039	0.49	
SUCI(C)	Mozammel Hossain Mondal	1,016	0.48	
AJUP	Sukla Saha	840	0.40	
Independent	Utpal Ghosh	639	0.30	
NOTA	None of the above	1,550	0.74	▼0.21
Majority		30,780	14.6	▲8.92
Turnout		210,762	90.51	▲4.56
AITC hold		Swing		

=== 2021 ===
.# Jeber Sekh, contesting as an independent candidate, was a rebel Trinamool Congress member.

West Bengal assembly elections, 2021: Chapra
Party	Candidate	Votes	%	±%
AITC	Rukbanur Rahman	73,866	34.65	
Independent	Jeber Sekh	61,748	28.97	
BJP	Kalyan Kumar Nandi	58,168	27.29	
CPI(M)	Jahangir Biswas (Raju)	11,722	5.5	
Indian Secular Front	Kanchan Moitra	3,865	1.81	
NOTA	None of the above	2,023	0.95	
Majority		12,118	5.68	
Turnout		213,175	85.95	
AITC hold		Swing		

=== 2016 ===
West Bengal assembly elections, 2016: Chapra
Party	Candidate	Votes	%	±%
AITC	Rukbanur Rahman	89,556	47.79	+0.65
CPI(M)	Shamsul Islam Mollah	76,093	40.61	−4.93
BJP	Sutirtha Chakraborty (Chuni)	14,887	7.94	+3.63
SS	Samaresh Biswas	4,081	2.18	
NOTA	None of the above	1,894	1.01	
CPI(ML)L	Dhananjay Ganguly	884	0.47	
Turnout		187,895	85.23	−2.62
AITC hold		Swing		

=== 2011 ===
In the 2011 election, Rukbanur Rahaman of Trinamool Congress defeated his nearest rival Shamsul Islam Mollah of CPI(M).

West Bengal assembly elections, 2011: Chapra constituency
Party	Candidate	Votes	%	±%
AITC	Rukbanur Rahaman	77,435	47.14	−9.10#
CPI(M)	Shamsul Islam Mollah	74,802	45.54	+2.22
BJP	Baidyanath Biswas	7,078	4.31	
CPI(ML)L	Bijoy Kumar Saha	2,765		
JD(U)	Soumen Mandal	2,180		
Turnout		164,260	87.87	
AITC gain from CPI(M)		Swing	-11.32#	

.# Swing calculated on Congress+Trinamool Congress vote percentages taken together in 2006.

=== 2006 ===
In 2006 and 2001 state assembly elections, Shamsul Islam Mollah of CPI(M) won the Chapra assembly seat defeating his nearest rivals, Abdur Rashid Mollick of Congress in 2006 and Julfikar Khan of Trinamool Congress in 2001. Contests in most years were multi cornered but only winners and runners are being mentioned. Mir Quasem Mondal of CPI(M) defeated Julfikar Khan representing Congress in 1996, and Arun Kumar Ghosh of Congress in 1991. Mir Qusem of CPI(M) defeated Dilip Dutta of Congress in 1987. Sahabauddin Mondal of CPI(M) defeated Arun Biswas, Independent, in 1982 and Kazi Safluddin of Janata Party in 1977.

=== 1972 ===
Ghiasuddin Ahmad of Congress won in 1972. Sahabuddin Mondal of CPI(M) won in 1971. Salil Behari Hundle of Bangla Congress won in 1969. J.Mojumdar of Bangla Congress won in 1967. Mohananda Haldar of Sanjukta Biplabi Parishad won in 1962, The Chapra constituency did not exist prior to that.
