= Gokarna, West Bengal =

Gokarna
- Village
- Location in West Bengal, India Gokarna (India)
- Coordinates: 24.0541°N 88.1176°E
- Country: India
- State: West Bengal
- District: Murshidabad

Population (2011)
  - Total: 16,198

Languages
  - Official: Bengali, English
- Time zone: UTC+5:30 (IST)
- PIN: 742136 (Gokarna)
- Lok Sabha constituency: Baharampur
- Vidhan Sabha constituency: Kandi
- Website: murshidabad.gov.in

Gokarna is a village in the Kandi CD block in the Kandi subdivision of Murshidabad district in the state of West Bengal, India.

== Geography ==
Cities, towns and locations in the Berhampore and Kandi subdivisions, Murshidabad district
M: municipal town, CT: census town, R: rural/ urban centre, H: historical centres
Owing to space constraints in the small map, the actual locations in a larger map may vary slightly

=== Location ===
Gokarna is located at 24.0541°N 88.1176°E.

=== Area overview ===
The area shown in the map alongside, covering Berhampore and Kandi subdivisions, is spread across both the natural physiographic regions of the district, Rarh and Bagri. The headquarters of Murshidabad district, Berhampore, is in this area. The ruins of Karnasubarna, the capital of Shashanka, the first important king of ancient Bengal who ruled in the 7th century, is located 9.6 kilometres (6.0 mi) south-west of Berhampore. The entire area is overwhelmingly rural with over 80% of the population living in the rural areas.

Note: The map alongside presents some of the notable locations in the subdivisions. All places marked in the map are linked in the larger full screen map.

== Demographics ==
According to the 2011 Census of India, Gokarna had a total population of 16,198, of which 8,293 (51%) were males and 7,905 (49%) were females. Population in the age range 0–6 years was 1,919. The total number of literate persons in Gokarna was 9,452 (66.20% of the population over 6 years).

== Transport ==
State Highway 11, running from Mahammad Bazar (in Birbhum district) to Ranaghat (in Nadia district) passes through Gokarna. This section is locally popular as Badshahi Road.

Karna Subarna railway station and Khagraghat Road railway station are located nearby.

== Education ==
Gokarna P.M. High School was established in 1905 and has facilities for teaching from class V – XII.

== Healthcare ==
Gokarna Rural Hospital functions with 15 beds.
