= Barua, Murshidabad =

Barua
- Census Town
- Location in West Bengal, India Barua (India)
- Coordinates: 23.9414°N 88.2336°E
- State: West Bengal
- District: Murshidabad

Area
  - Total: 4.252 km^{2} (1.642 sq mi)

Population (2011)
  - Total: 8,852
  - Density: 2,082/km^{2} (5,392/sq mi)

Languages
  - Official: Bengali, English
- Time zone: UTC+5:30 (IST)
- PIN: 742133
- Telephone/STD code: 03482
- Vehicle registration: WB-57, WB-58
- Lok Sabha constituency: Baharampur
- Vidhan Sabha constituency: Beldanga
- Website: murshidbad.nic.in

Barua is a census town in the Beldanga I CD block in the Berhampore subdivision of the Murshidabad district in the state of West Bengal, India.

== Geography ==
Cities, towns and locations in the Berhampore and Kandi subdivisions, Murshidabad district
M: municipal town, CT: census town, R: rural/ urban centre, H: historical centres
Owing to space constraints in the small map, the actual locations in a larger map may vary slightly

=== Location ===
Barua is located at 23.9414°N 88.2336°E.

=== Area overview ===
The area shown in the map alongside, covering Berhampore and Kandi subdivisions, is spread across both the natural physiographic regions of the district, Rarh and Bagri. The headquarters of Murshidabad district, Berhampore, is in this area. The ruins of Karnasubarna, the capital of Shashanka, the first important king of ancient Bengal who ruled in the 7th century, is located 9.6 kilometres (6.0 mi) south-west of Berhampore. The entire area is overwhelmingly rural with over 80% of the population living in the rural areas.

Note: The map alongside presents some of the notable locations in the subdivisions. All places marked in the map are linked in the larger full screen map.

== Demographics ==
According to the 2011 Census of India, Barua (P) had a total population of 8,852, of which 4,521 (51%) were males and 4,331 (49%) were females. Population in the age range 0–6 years was 1,431. The total number of literate persons in Barua (P) was 5,589 (75.31% of the population 6 years).

== Infrastructure ==
According to the District Census Handbook, Murshidabad, 2011, Barua (P) covered an area of 4.252 km^{2}The protected water-supply involved tap water from treated source etc. It had 400 domestic electric connections, 40 road lighting points. Among the medical facilities it had 1 hospital, 1 dispensary/ health centre, 1 family welfare centre, 1 maternity & child welfare centre, 1 veterinary hospital, 10 medicine shops. Among the educational facilities, it had 1 primary school, 1 secondary school, 1 senior secondary school, general degree college at Beldanga 1 km away. It had 5 non-formal education centres (Sarva Shiksha Abhiyan). It produced wooden furniture, sweets. It had the branch offices of 1 nationalised bank, 1 private commercial bank.

== Healthcare ==
Beldanga I CD block is one of the areas of Murshidabad district where ground water is affected by high level of arsenic contamination. The WHO guideline for arsenic in drinking water is 10 mg/ litre, and the Indian Standard value is 50 mg/ litre. The maximum concentration in Beldanga I CD block is 1,700 mg/litre.
