= Surangapur =

- Village
- Location in West Bengal, India Surangapur (India)
- Coordinates: 23.9216°N 88.4321°E
- Country: India
- State: West Bengal
- District: Murshidabad

Population (2011)
  - Total: 6,343

Languages
  - Official: Bengali, English
- Time zone: UTC+5:30 (IST)
- Lok Sabha constituency: Baharampur
- Vidhan Sabha constituency: Naoda
- Website: murshidabad.gov.in

Surangapur is a village in the Naoda CD block in the Berhampore subdivision of Murshidabad district in the state of West Bengal, India.

== Geography ==
Cities, towns and locations in the Berhampore and Kandi subdivisions, Murshidabad district
M: municipal town, CT: census town, R: rural/ urban centre, H: historical centres
Owing to space constraints in the small map, the actual locations in a larger map may vary slightly

=== Location ===
Surangapur is located at 23.9216°N 88.4321°E.

=== Area overview ===
The area shown in the map alongside, covering Berhampore and Kandi subdivisions, is spread across both the natural physiographic regions of the district, Rarh and Bagri. The headquarters of Murshidabad district, Berhampore, is in this area. The ruins of Karnasubarna, the capital of Shashanka, the first important king of ancient Bengal who ruled in the 7th century, is located 9.6 kilometres (6.0 mi) south-west of Berhampore. The area is overwhelmingly rural with over 80% of the population living in the rural areas.

Note: The map alongside presents some of the notable locations in the subdivisions. All places marked in the map are linked in the larger full screen map.

== Demographics ==
According to the 2011 Census of India, Surangapur had a total population of 6,343, of which 3,251 (51%) were males and 3,092 (49%) were females. Population in the age range 0–6 years was 596. The total number of literates in Surangapur was 4,362 (75.90% of the population over 6 years).

== Civic administration ==
=== CD block HQ ===
The headquarters of Naoda CD block are located at Surangapur.
