= Goaljan =

- Census Town
- Location in West Bengal, India Goaljan (India)
- Coordinates: 24.11479°N 88.24223°E
- Country: India
- State: West Bengal
- District: Murshidabad

Population (2011)
  - Total: 5,001

Languages
  - Official: Bengali, English
- Time zone: UTC+5:30 (IST)
- Vehicle registration: WB
- Lok Sabha constituency: Baharampur
- Vidhan Sabha constituency: Baharampur
- Website: wb.gov.in

Goaljan is a census town in the Berhampore CD block of the Berhampore subdivision in the Murshidabad district in the Indian state of West Bengal.

== Geography ==
Cities, towns and locations in the Berhampore and Kandi subdivisions, Murshidabad district
M: municipal town, CT: census town, R: rural/ urban centre, H: historical centres
Owing to space constraints in the small map, the actual locations in a larger map may vary slightly

=== Location ===
Goaljan is located at 24.11479°N 88.24223°E.

=== Area overview ===
The area shown in the map alongside, covering Berhampore and Kandi subdivisions, is spread across both the natural physiographic regions of the district, Rarh and Bagri. The headquarters of Murshidabad district, Berhampore, is in this area. The ruins of Karnasubarna, the capital of Shashanka, the first important king of ancient Bengal who ruled in the 7th century, is located 9.6 kilometres (6.0 mi) south-west of Berhampore. The entire area is overwhelmingly rural with over 80% of the population living in the rural areas.

Note: The map alongside presents some of the notable locations in the subdivisions. All places marked in the map are linked in the larger full screen map.

== Demographics ==
According to the 2011 Census of India, Goaljan had a total population of 4,850, of which 2,446 (50%) were males and 2,404 (50%) were females. Population in the age range 0–6 years was 439. The total number of literate persons in Goaljan was 3,795 (86.03% of the population over 6 years).

As per 2001 Census of India, Goaljan had a population of 5001. Males constitute 51% of the population and females 49%. Goaljan has an average literacy rate of 76%, higher than the national average of 59.5%: male literacy is 80%, and female literacy is 72%. In Goaljan, 11% of the population is under 6 years of age.

== Infrastructure ==
According to the District Census Handbook, Murshidabad, 2011, Goaljan covered an area of 1.91 km^{2}. It had 5 km roads with open drains. The protected water-supply involved overhead tank, tap water from treated source. It had 375 domestic electric connections, 5 road lighting points. Among the medical facilities it had 5 dispensaries/ health centres, 1 nursing homes. Among the educational facilities, it had 3 primary schools, 2 secondary schools, 2 senior secondary schools in town, general degree college at Radhaghat 4 km away. Among the social, recreational & cultural facilities it had 1 auditorium/ community hall, 1 public library. It produced sal leaf plates, beedi, wood work. It had branch offices of 1 nationalised bank, 1 private commercial bank, 1 cooperative bank.

== Healthcare ==
Berhampore CD block is one of the areas of Murshidabad district where ground water is affected by high level of arsenic contamination. The WHO guideline for arsenic in drinking water is 10 mg/ litre, and the Indian Standard value is 50 mg/ litre. The maximum concentration in Berhampore CD block is 635 mg/litre.
