= Shaktipur =

Saktipur
- Village
- Location in West Bengal, India Saktipur (India)
- Coordinates: 23.86397°N 88.19873°E
- Country: India
- State: West Bengal
- District: Murshidabad

Population (2011)
  - Total: 13,123

Languages
  - Official: Bengali, English
- Time zone: UTC+5:30 (IST)
- Lok Sabha constituency: Baharampur
- Vidhan Sabha constituency: Rejinagar
- Website: murshidabad.gov.in

Saktipur is a village in the Beldanga II CD block in the Berhampore subdivision of Murshidabad district in the state of West Bengal, India. It is situated 35km away from district headquarter Baharampur.

== Geography ==
Cities, towns and locations in the Berhampore and Kandi subdivisions, Murshidabad district
M: municipal town, CT: census town, R: rural/ urban centre, H: historical centres
Owing to space constraints in the small map, the actual locations in a larger map may vary slightly

=== Location ===
Saktipur is located at 23.86397°N 88.19873°E.

=== Area overview ===
The area shown in the map alongside, covering Berhampore and Kandi subdivisions, is spread across both the natural physiographic regions of the district, Rarh and Bagri. The headquarters of Murshidabad district, Berhampore, is in this area. The ruins of Karnasubarna, the capital of Shashanka, the first important king of ancient Bengal who ruled in the 7th century, is located 9.6 kilometres (6.0 mi) south-west of Berhampore. The entire area is overwhelmingly rural with over 80% of the population living in the rural areas.

Note: The map alongside presents some of the notable locations in the subdivisions. All places marked in the map are linked in the larger full screen map.

== Demographics ==
According to the 2011 Census of India, Saktipur had a total population of 13,123, of which 6,741 (51%) were males and 6,382 (49%) were females. Population in the age range 0-6 years was 1,661. The total number of literate persons in Saktipur was 7,709 (67.26% of the population over 6 years).

== Civic administration ==
=== Police station ===
Saktipur police station has jurisdiction over a part of the saktitpur CD block.

=== CD block HQ ===
The headquarters of Beldanga II CD block are located at Saktipur.

== Healthcare ==
Saktipur Rural Hospital, with 30 beds, is a major government facility in Beldanga II CD block.
