= Hariharpara =

- Village
- Location in West Bengal, India Hariharpara (India)
- Coordinates: 24.0468°N 88.4244°E
- Country: India
- State: West Bengal
- District: Murshidabad

Government
  - M.L.A: Niamot Sheikh

Population (2011)
  - Total: 14,827

Languages
  - Official: Bengali, English
- Time zone: UTC+5:30 (IST)
- Lok Sabha constituency: Murshidabad
- Vidhan Sabha constituency: Hariharpara
- Website: murshidabad.gov.in

Hariharpara is a village, with a police station, in the Hariharpara CD block in the Berhampore subdivision of Murshidabad district in the state of West Bengal, India.

== Geography ==
Cities, towns and locations in the Berhampore and Kandi subdivisions, Murshidabad district
M: municipal town, CT: census town, R: rural/ urban centre, H: historical centres
Owing to space constraints in the small map, the actual locations in a larger map may vary slightly

=== Location ===
Hariharpara is located at 24.0468°N 88.4244°E.

=== Area overview ===
The area shown in the map alongside, covering Berhampore and Kandi subdivisions, is spread across both the natural physiographic regions of the district, Rarh and Bagri. The headquarters of Murshidabad district, Berhampore, is in this area. The ruins of Karnasubarna, the capital of Shashanka, the first important king of ancient Bengal who ruled in the 7th century, is located 9.6 kilometres (6.0 mi) south-west of Berhampore. The entire area is overwhelmingly rural with over 80% of the population living in the rural areas.

Note: The map alongside presents some of the notable locations in the subdivisions. All places marked in the map are linked in the larger full screen map.

== Demographics ==
According to the 2011 Census of India, Hariharpara had a total population of 14,827, of which 7,570 (51%) were males and 7,257 (49%) were females. Population in the age range 0–6 years was 1,769. The total number of literate persons in Hariharpara was 9,894 (75.77% of the population over 6 years).

== Civic administration ==
=== Police station ===
Hariharpara police station has jurisdiction over Hariharpara CD block.

=== CD block HQ ===
The headquarters of Hariharpara CD block are located at Hariharpara.

== Transport ==
Baharampur-Amtala Road passes through Hariharpara.

== Education ==
Hazi A.K. Khan College was established at Hariharpara in 2008. Affiliated with the University of Kalyani, it offers honours courses in Bengali, English, history and education.

== Healthcare ==
The Block Primary Health Centre at Hariharpara functions with 20 beds.

== Notable Person ==
- Niamot Sheikh, M.L.A of Hariharpara.
