= Sarulia =

- Village
- Location in West Bengal, India Sarulia (India)
- Coordinates: 23.9261°N 88.2401°E
- Country: India
- State: West Bengal
- District: Murshidabad

Population (2011)
  - Total: 9,417

Languages
  - Official: Bengali, English
- Time zone: UTC+5:30 (IST)
- Telephone/STD code: 03484
- Lok Sabha constituency: Baharampur
- Vidhan Sabha constituency: Beldanga
- Website: murshidabad.gov.in

Sarulia is a village in the Beldanga I CD block in the Berhampore subdivision of Murshidabad district in the state of West Bengal, India.

== Geography ==
Cities, towns and locations in the Berhampore and Kandi subdivisions, Murshidabad district
M: municipal town, CT: census town, R: rural/ urban centre, H: historical centres
Owing to space constraints in the small map, the actual locations in a larger map may vary slightly

=== Location ===
Sarulia is located at 23.9261°N 88.2401°E.

=== Area overview ===
The area shown in the map alongside, covering Berhampore and Kandi subdivisions, is spread across both the natural physiographic regions of the district, Rarh and Bagri. The headquarters of Murshidabad district, Berhampore, is in this area. The ruins of Karnasubarna, the capital of Shashanka, the first important king of ancient Bengal who ruled in the 7th century, is located 9.6 kilometres (6.0 mi) south-west of Berhampore. The entire area is overwhelmingly rural with over 80% of the population living in the rural areas.

Note: The map alongside presents some of the notable locations in the subdivisions. All places marked in the map are linked in the larger full screen map.

== Demographics ==
According to the 2011 Census of India, Sarulia had a total population of 9,417, of which 4,780 (51%) were males and 4,637 (49%) were females. Population in the age range 0–6 years was 1,593. The total number of literate persons in Sarulia was 5,033 (64.33% of the population over 6 years).

== Civic administration ==
=== CD block HQ ===
The headquarters of Beldanga I CD block are located at Sarulia.

== Transport ==
National Highway 12 (old number NH 34) passes through this block.

Beldanga railway station on the Ranaghat-Lalgola branch line is about 2 km from Sarulia. It was opened in 1905.
