= Amtala, Murshidabad =

Amtala
- Town
- Location in West Bengal, India Amtala (India)
- Coordinates: 23.9322°N 88.4476°E
- Country: India
- State: West Bengal
- District: Murshidabad

Languages
  - Official: Bengali, English
- Time zone: UTC+5:30 (IST)
- PIN: 742121 (Amtala)
- Lok Sabha constituency: Baharampur
- Vidhan Sabha constituency: Naoda
- Website: murshidabad.gov.in

Amtala is a town, with a college, not identified in 2011 census, in Naoda, a community development block in India in the Berhampore subdivision of Murshidabad district in the state of West Bengal.

== Geography ==
Cities, towns and locations in the Berhampore and Kandi subdivisions, Murshidabad district
M: municipal town, CT: census town, R: rural/ urban centre, H: historical centres
Owing to space constraints in the small map, the actual locations in a larger map may vary slightly

=== Location ===
Amtala is located at 23.9322°N 88.4476°E.

=== Area overview ===
The area shown in the map alongside, covering Berhampore and Kandi subdivisions, is spread across both the natural physiographic regions of the district, Rarh and Bagri. The headquarters of Murshidabad district, Berhampore, is in this area. The ruins of Karnasubarna, the capital of Shashanka, the first important king of ancient Bengal who ruled in the 7th century, is located 9.6 kilometres (6.0 mi) south-west of Berhampore. The entire area is overwhelmingly rural with over 80% of the population living in the rural areas.

Note: The map alongside presents some of the notable locations in the subdivisions. All places marked in the map are linked in the larger full screen map.

== Education ==
Jatindra Rajendra Mahavidyalaya was established in 1986 at Amtala.

== Healthcare ==
Amtala Rural Hospital, with 50 beds, is the major government medical facility in Naoda CD block.
