= Raktamrittika Mahavihara =

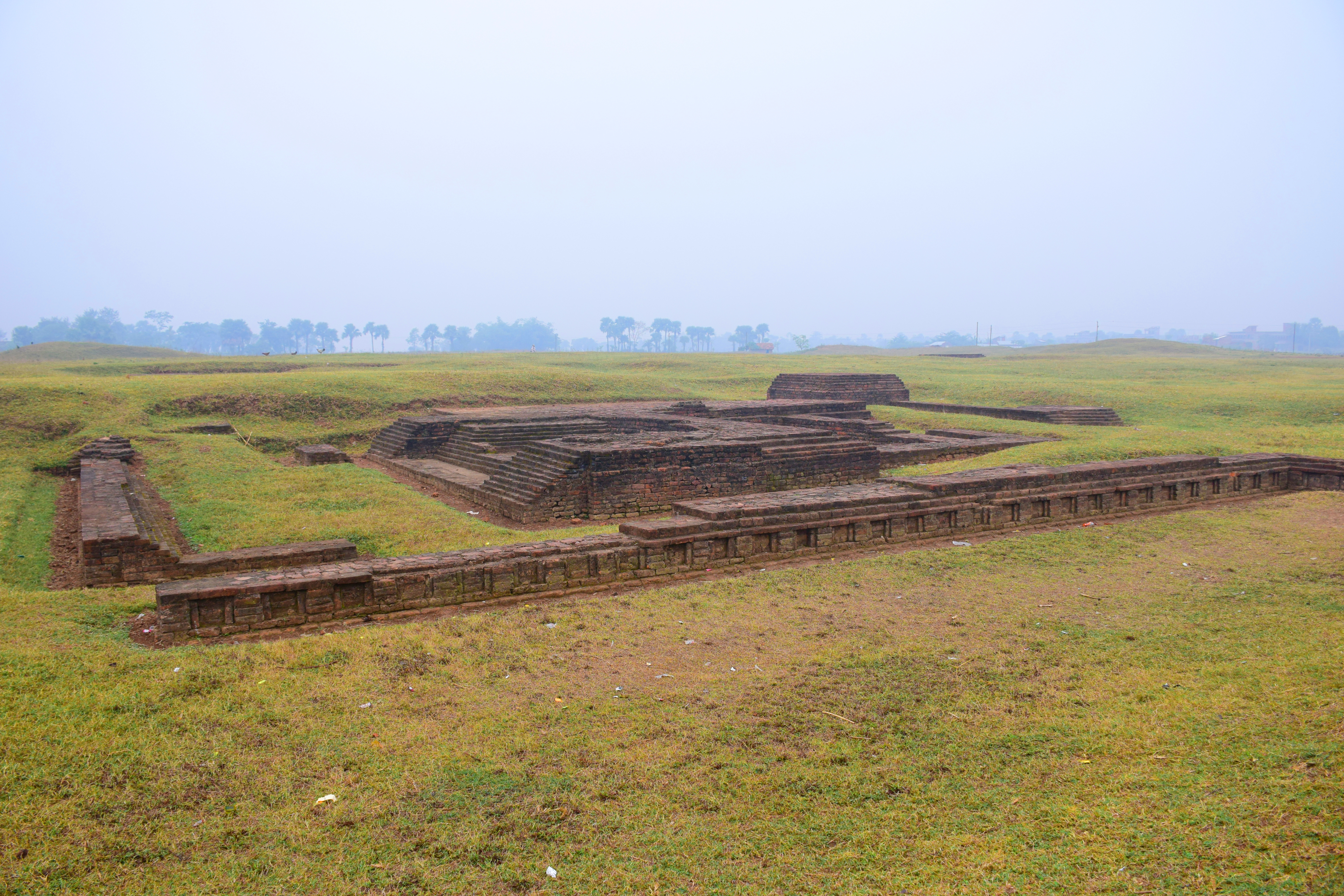
- The ruins of Raktamrittika Mahavihara

- Location within West Bengal Location within South Asia
- 24.0254973°N 88.1862416°E
- Type: Centre of learning, ancient university
- Location: Murshidabad district, West Bengal, India
- Region: Bengal

History
- Built: 5th century
- Abandoned: 12-13th century

Site notes
- Height: 7.6 m (25 ft)
- Length: 330 ft (100 m)
- Width: 279 ft (85 m)
- Area: 10.22 ha (25.3 acres)
- Excavation dates: 1962–1963, 1964–1965, 1966–1967, 1968–1969, 1971–1972, 1972-1973, 1981-1982
- Condition: In ruins
- Owner: Government of India
- Management: Archaeological Survey of India, University of Calcutta
- Public access: Yes

Raktamrittika Mahavihara was a renowned mahavihara (Buddhist monastic university) in ancient Bengal (modern-day West Bengal), India. It was located in the city of Karnasuvarna and about 200 kilometres (120 mi) north of Kolkata.

The Mahavihara was established in the 5th century AD during the Gupta era, and is older than the Nalanda Mahavihara.
