= Beldanga II =

- Community development block
- Interactive map of Beldanga II
- Coordinates: 23.84797°N 88.25973°E
- Country: India
- State: West Bengal
- District: Murshidabad

Government
  - Type: Federal democracy

Area
  - Total: 207.93 km^{2} (80.28 sq mi)
- Elevation: 17 m (56 ft)

Population (2011)
  - Total: 250,458
  - Density: 1,204.5/km^{2} (3,119.7/sq mi)

Languages
  - Official: Bengali, English

Literacy
  - Literacy (2011): 67.86%
- Time zone: UTC+5:30 (IST)
- PIN: 742191 (Kashipur); 742163 (Saktipur); 742175 (Sabdamnagar)
- Telephone/STD code: 03482
- ISO 3166 code: IN-WB
- Vehicle registration: WB-57, WB-58
- Lok Sabha constituency: Baharampur
- Vidhan Sabha constituency: Rejinagar
- Website: murshidabad.gov.in

Beldanga II is a community development block that forms an administrative division in the Berhampore subdivision of Murshidabad district in the Indian state of West Bengal.

== History ==
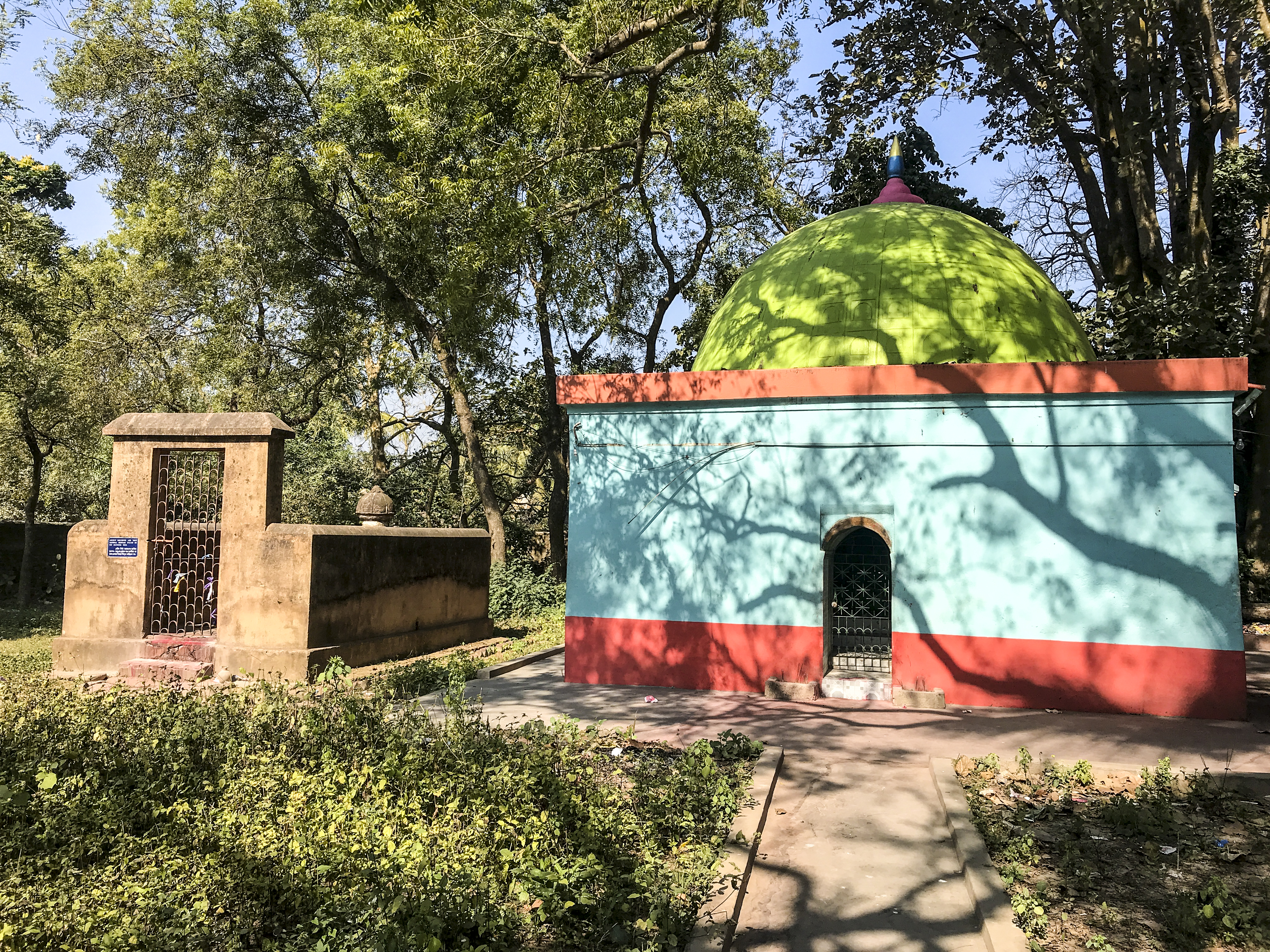
Mir Madan’s tomb (left) and Farid Shah's darga (right)

Tomb of Mir Madan: Mir Madan, one of the most trusted officers and chief of the artillery of Nawab Siraj Ud Dowla was killed on 23 June 1757, in the Battle of Plassey.

Some cadres of his troop buried him secretly in Faridpur village, Murshidabad district (P.S. Rejinagar) near the Palashi battlefield. This place is known as Farid Shah's Dargah (Mosque).

According to the List of Monuments of National Importance in West Bengal, the Tomb of Mir Madan is an ASI listed monument.

== Geography ==
Rejinagar is located at 23°50′53″N 88°15′35″E

Beldanga II CD block is bounded by Beldanga I CD block in the north, Naoda CD block in the east, Kaliganj CD block in Nadia district and Ketugram II CD block in Bardhaman district in the south and Bharatpur I and Bharatpur II CD blocks in the west.

Beldanga II CD block lies in the Ganges-Bhagirathi Basin, which is a long and narrow river valley. The Bhagirathi River splits the district into two natural physiographic regions – Rarh on the west and Bagri on the east. It has fertile soil suitable for cultivation.

The Bagri or the eastern part of the district is a low lying alluvial plain with the shape of an isosceles triangle. The Ganges/Padma and the Bhagirathi form the two equal sides; the Jalangi forms the entire base; other offshoots of the Ganges meander within the area. It is liable to be flooded by the spill of the Bhagirathi and other rivers.

Beldanga II CD block has an area of 207.93 km^{2}. It has 1 panchayat samity, 11 gram panchayats, 171 gram sansads (village councils), 71 mouzas and 61 inhabited villages. Rejinagar and Shaktipur police stations serve this block. Headquarters of this CD block is at Shaktipur.

Gram panchayats of Beldanga II block/ panchayat samiti are: Andulberia I, Andulberia II, Dadpur, Kamnagar, Kashipur, Ramnagar-Bachhra, Rampara I, Rampara II, Saktipur, Sompara I, Sompara II.

== Demographics ==
=== Population ===
According to the 2011 Census of India, Beldanga II CD block had a total population of 250,458, all of which were rural. There were 129,144 (52%) males and 121,314 (48%) females. Population in the age range 0–6 years was 34,837. Scheduled Castes numbered 20,863 (8.33%) and Scheduled Tribes numbered 541 (0.22%).

As per 2001 census, Beldanga II block has a total population of 210,195, out of which 109,107 were males and 101,088 were females. Beldanga II block registered a population growth of 19.21 per cent during the 1991-2001 decade. Decadal growth for the district was 23.70 per cent. Decadal growth in West Bengal was 17.84 per cent.

The decadal growth of population in Beldanga II CD block in 2001-2011 was 19.16%.

The decadal growth rate of population in Murshidabad district was as follows: 33.5% in 1951-61, 28.6% in 1961-71, 25.5% in 1971-81, 28.2% in 1981-91, 23.8% in 1991-2001 and 21.1% in 2001-11. The decadal growth rate for West Bengal in 2001-11 was 13.93%.

There are reports of Bangladeshi infiltrators entering Murshidabad district.

Decadal Population Growth Rate (%)

- Beldanga II CD block
- Murshidabad district
- West Bengal

=== Villages ===
Large villages Beldanga II CD block were (2011 census population figures in brackets): Kamnagar (7,923), Kataikona (4,191), Mian (4,968), Shaktipur (13,123), Mahata (5,000), Gholla (4,881), Manikahar (8,114), Palitpara (5,523), Bachhara (5,127), Dakshin Bachhara (4,112), Rejinagar (10,103), Rampara Faridpur (7,768), Pilkhana (5,293), Takipur (5,908), Sadhukhali (4,154), Amarpur (5,829), Bikal Nagar (4,841), Jainagar (5,422), Loknathpur (9,512), Nazirpur (6,912), Gopalpur (6,304), Kashipur (11,967), Jhikra (8,075) and Andulbaria (13,929), Sompara (2,577).

=== Literacy ===
As per the 2011 census, the total number of literates in Beldanga II CD block was 146,321 (67.86% of the population over 6 years) out of which males numbered 79,229 (71.10% of the male population over 6 years) and females numbered 67,092 (64.40% of the female population over 6 years). The gender disparity (the difference between female and male literacy rates) was 6.70%.

See also – List of West Bengal districts ranked by literacy rate

Literacy in CD blocks of
Murshidabad district
Jangipur subdivision
Farakka – 59.75%
Samserganj – 54.98%
Suti I – 58.40%
Suti II – 55.23%
Raghunathganj I – 64.49%
Raghunathganj II – 61.17%
Sagardighi – 65.27%
Lalbag subdivision
Murshidabad-Jiaganj – 69.14%
Bhagawangola I - 57.22%
Bhagawangola II – 53.48%
Lalgola– 64.32%
Nabagram – 70.83%
Sadar subdivision
Berhampore – 73.51%
Beldanga I – 70.06%
Beldanga II – 67.86%
Hariharpara – 69.20%
Naoda – 66.09%
Kandi subdivision
Kandi – 65.13%
Khargram – 63.56%
Burwan – 68.96%
Bharatpur I – 62.93%
Bharatpur II – 66.07%
Domkol subdivision
Domkal – 55.89%
Raninagar I – 57.81%
Raninagar II – 54.81%
Jalangi – 58.73%
Source: 2011 Census: CD Block Wise
Primary Census Abstract Data

=== Language and religion ===
Religion in Beldanga II CD block (2011)
Islam	61.82%
Hinduism	38.05%
Other or not stated	0.13%

In the 2011 census, Muslims numbered 154,827 and formed 61.82% of the population in Beldanga II CD block. Hindus numbered 95,301 and formed 38.05% of the population. Others numbered 330 and formed 0.13% of the population. In Beldanga I and Beldanga II CD blocks taken together while the proportion of Muslims increased from 64.65% in 1991 to 67.95% in 2001, the proportion of Hindus declined from 35.35% in 1991 to 31.91% in 2001.

Murshidabad district had 4,707,573 Muslims who formed 66.27% of the population, 2,359,061 Hindus who formed 33.21% of the population, and 37, 173 persons belonging to other religions who formed 0.52% of the population, in the 2011 census. While the proportion of Muslim population in the district increased from 61.40% in 1991 to 63.67% in 2001, the proportion of Hindu population declined from 38.39% in 1991 to 35.92% in 2001.

Murshidabad was Muslim majority district along with Nadia, Malda, West Dinajpur in West Bengal at the time of partition of India in 1947. The proportion of Muslims in the population of Murshidabad district in 1951 was 55.24%. The Radcliffe Line had placed Muslim majority Murshidabad in India and the Hindu majority Khulna in Pakistan, in order to maintain the integrity of the Ganges river system In India.

Bengali is the predominant language, spoken by 99.76% of the population.

== Rural poverty ==
As per the Human Development Report 2004 for West Bengal, the rural poverty ratio in Murshidabad district was 46.12%. Purulia, Bankura and Birbhum districts had higher rural poverty ratios. These estimates were based on Central Sample data of NSS 55th round 1999-2000.

== Economy ==
=== Livelihood ===
In Beldanga II CD block in 2011, amongst the class of total workers, cultivators formed 21.85%, agricultural labourers 35.01%, household industry workers 9.52% and other workers 33.62%.

=== Infrastructure ===
There are 61 inhabited villages in Beldanga II CD block. 100% villages have power supply but not drinking water supply. 22 villages (36.07%) have post offices. 60 villages (98.36%) have telephones (including landlines, public call offices and mobile phones). 20 villages (32.79%) have a pucca approach road and 36 villages (59.02%) have transport communication (includes bus service, rail facility and navigable waterways). 7 villages (11.48%) have agricultural credit societies and 8 villages (13.11%) have banks.

=== Agriculture ===
Persons engaged in agriculture
in Beldanga II CD block
1. Bargadars (2.93%)
2. Patta holders (7.81%)
3. Small farmers (5.42%)
4. Marginal farmers (37.7%)
5. Agricultural labourers (46.1%)

From 1977 onwards major land reforms took place in West Bengal. Land in excess of land ceiling was acquired and distributed amongst the peasants. Following land reforms land ownership pattern has undergone transformation. In 2013-14, persons engaged in agriculture in Beldanga II CD block could be classified as follows: bargadars 1,866 (2.93%,) patta (document) holders 4,976 (7.81%), small farmers (possessing land between 1 and 2 hectares) 3,455 (5.42%), marginal farmers (possessing land up to 1 hectare) 24,042 (37.74%) and agricultural labourers 29,371 (46.10%).

Beldanga II CD Block had 58 fertiliser depots, 2 seed stores and 50 fair price shops in 2013-14.

In 2013-14, Beldanga II CD block produced 86,266 tonnes of Aman paddy, the main winter crop from 28,093 hectares, 21,043 tonnes of Boro paddy (spring crop) from 6,264 hectares, 642 tonnes of Aus paddy (summer crop) from 226 hectares, 17,434 tonnes of wheat from 6,125 hectares, 3 tonnes of maize from 1 hectare, 126,538 tonnes of jute from 8,855 hectares, 4,095 tonnes of potatoes from 199 hectares and 160,074 tonnes of sugar cane from 2,370 hectares. It also produced pulses and oilseeds.

In 2013-14, the total area irrigated in Beldanga II CD block was 11,673 hectares, out of which 425 hectares were irrigated with tank water, 647 hectares by river lift irrigation, 101 hectares by deep tube wells, and 10,500 hectares by other means.

=== Silk and handicrafts ===
Murshidabad is famous for its silk industry since the Middle Ages. There are three distinct categories in this industry, namely (i) Mulberry cultivation and silkworm rearing (ii) Peeling of raw silk (iii) Weaving of silk fabrics. Prime locations for weaving (silk and cotton) are: Khargram, Raghunathganj I, Nabagram, Beldanga I, Beldanga II and Raninagar-I CD Blocks.

Ivory carving is an important cottage industry from the era of the Nawabs. The main areas where this industry has flourished are Khagra and Jiaganj. 99% of ivory craft production is exported. In more recent years sandalwood etching has become more popular than ivory carving. Bell metal and Brass utensils are manufactured in large quantities at Khagra, Berhampore, Kandi and Jangipur. Beedi making has flourished in the Jangipur subdivision.

=== Banking ===
In 2013-14, Beldanaga II CD Block had offices of 8 commercial banks and 3 gramin banks.

=== Backward Regions Grant Fund ===
Murshidabad district is listed as a backward region and receives financial support from the Backward Regions Grant Fund. The fund, created by the Government of India, is designed to redress regional imbalances in development. As of 2012, 272 districts across the country were listed under this scheme. The list includes 11 districts of West Bengal.

== Transport ==
Beldanga II CD block has 10 ferry services and 5 originating/ terminating bus routes.

The Ranaghat-Lalgola branch line was opened in 1905. It passes through this CD block and nearest station is Rejinagar railway station.

National Highway 12 (old number NH 34) passes through this block.

== Education ==
In 2013-14, Beldanga II CD block had 105 primary schools with 14,884 students, 18 middle schools with 3,241 students, 6 high school with 6,100 students and 10 higher secondary schools with 19,647 students. Beldanga II CD block had 345 institutions for special and non-formal education with 16,358 students

In Beldanga II CD block, amongst the 61 inhabited villages, 1 village did not have a school, 49 villages had more than 1 primary school, 22 villages had at least 1 primary school, 40 villages had at least 1 primary and 1 middle school and 18 villages had at least 1 middle and 1 secondary school.

== Healthcare ==
In 2014, Beldanga II CD block had 1 block primary health centre, 3 primary health centres and 2 private nursing homes with total 54 beds and 8 doctors (excluding private bodies). It had 34 family welfare subcentres. 4,127 patients were treated indoor and 176,352 patients were treated outdoor in the hospitals, health centres and subcentres of the CD Block.

Beldanga II CD block has Shaktipur Rural Hospital at Shaktipur (with 30 beds), Ramnagar-Bachra Primary Health Centre at Bachra (with 10 beds), Sompara PHC (with 4 beds) and Andulberia PHC at Nazirpur (with 10 beds).

Beldanga II CD block is one of the areas of Murshidabad district where ground water is affected by high level of arsenic contamination. The WHO guideline for arsenic in drinking water is 10 mg/ litre, and the Indian Standard value is 50 mg/ litre. All but one of the 26 blocks of Murshidabad district have arsenic contamination above the WHO level, all but two of the blocks have arsenic concentration above the Indian Standard value and 17 blocks have arsenic concentration above 300 mg/litre. The maximum concentration in Beldanga II CD block is 345 mg/litre.
