= Beldanga I =

- Community development block
- Beldanga
- Interactive map of Beldanga I
- Coordinates: 23.93°N 88.25°E
- Country: India
- State: West Bengal
- District: Murshidabad

Government
  - Type: Federal democracy

Area
  - Total: 168.75 km^{2} (65.15 sq mi)
- Elevation: 22 m (72 ft)

Population (2011)
  - Total: 319,322
  - Density: 1,892.3/km^{2} (4,901.0/sq mi)

Languages
  - Official: Bengali, English

Literacy
  - Literacy (2011): 70.06%
- Time zone: UTC+5:30 (IST)
- PIN: 742133 (Beldanga); 742134 (Bhabta); 742176 (Madda)
- Telephone/STD code: 03482
- ISO 3166 code: IN-WB
- Vehicle registration: WB-57, WB-58
- Lok Sabha constituency: Baharampur
- Vidhan Sabha constituency: Beldanga, Rejinagar, Naoda
- Website: murshidabad.gov.in

Beldanga I is a community development block that forms an administrative division in the Berhampore subdivision of Murshidabad district in the Indian state of West Bengal.

== Geography ==
Beldanga is located at 23°56′N 88°15′E

Beldanga I CD block lies in the Ganges-Bhagirathi Basin, which is a long and narrow river valley. The Bhagirathi River splits the district into two natural physiographic regions – Rarh on the west and Bagri on the east. It has fertile soil suitable for cultivation.

Beldanga I CD block is bounded by Berhampore CD block in the north, Hariharpara CD block in the east, Beldanga II CD block in the south and Nabagram CD block, in the west.

The Bagri or the eastern part of the district is a low lying alluvial plain with the shape of an isosceles triangle. The Ganges/Padma and the Bhagirathi form the two equal sides; the Jalangi forms the entire base; other offshoots of the Ganges meander within the area. It is liable to be flooded by the spill of the Bhagirathi and other rivers.

Beldanga I CD block has an area of 168.75 km^{2}. It has 1 panchayat samity, 13 gram panchayats, 204 gram sansads (village councils), 66 mouzas and 55 inhabited villages. Beldanga police station serves this block. Headquarters of this CD block is at Sarulia,

Gram panchayats of Beldanga I block/ panchayat samiti are: Begunbari, Bhabta I, Bhabta II, Chaitanyapur I, Chaitanyapur II, Debkundu, Kapasdanga, Madda, Mahula I, Mahula II, Mirzapur I, Mirzapur II and Sujapur-Kumarpur.

== Demographics ==
=== Population ===
According to the 2011 Census of India, Beldanga I CD block had a total population of 319,322, of which 310,470 were rural and 8,852 were urban. There were 164,147 (51%) males and 155,175 (49%) females. The population in the age range 0–6 years was 50,070. Scheduled Castes numbered 12,621 (3.95%) and Scheduled Tribes numbered 252 (0.08%).

As per 2001 census, Beldanga I block has a total population of 259,139, out of which 134,602 were males and 124,537 were females. Beldanga I block registered a population growth of 23.35 per cent during the 1991-2001 decade. Decadal growth for the district was 23.70 per cent. Decadal growth in West Bengal was 17.84 per cent.

The decadal growth of population in Beldanga I CD block in 2001-2011 was 23.18%.

The decadal growth rate of population in Murshidabad district was as follows: 33.5% in 1951–61, 28.6% in 1961–71, 25.5% in 1971–81, 28.2% in 1981–91, 23.8% in 1991-2001 and 21.1% in 2001–11. The decadal growth rate for West Bengal in 2001-11 was 13.93%.

There are reports of Bangladeshi infiltrators entering Murshidabad district.

Decadal Population Growth Rate (%)

- Beldanga I CD block
- Murshidabad district
- West Bengal

=== Census town and villages ===
The only census town in Beldanga I CD block was (2011 census population figure in bracket): Barua (P) (8,852).

Large villages in Beldanga I CD block were (2011 census population figure in brackets) : Mahala (11,793), Bhabta (13,988), Gangapur (5,499), Gopinathpur (12,522), Pulinda (8,761), Naoda (8,071), Dalua (4,267), Rameswarpur (6.075), Mahespur (4,800), Radhaballabhpur (4,109), Jalalpur (5,625), Kumarpur (6,704), Jhunka (8,783), Debkunda (11,429), Madda (15,114), Hareknagar (12,703), Bishannagar (12,896), Maniknagar (9,649), Kazisaha (13,489), Begunbari (10,893), Sarulia (P) (9,417), Mahyampur (7,050), Mirzapur (27,364), Naopukhuria (15,454) and Kapasdanga (13,123).

=== Literacy ===
As per the 2011 census, the total number of literate persons in Beldanga I CD block was 188,635 (70.06% of the population over 6 years) out of which males numbered 99,823 (71.92% of the male population over 6 years) and females numbered 88,812 (68.08% of the female population over 6 years). The gender disparity (the difference between female and male literacy rates) was 3.84%.

See also – List of West Bengal districts ranked by literacy rate

Literacy in CD blocks of
Murshidabad district
Jangipur subdivision
Farakka – 59.75%
Samserganj – 54.98%
Suti I – 58.40%
Suti II – 55.23%
Raghunathganj I – 64.49%
Raghunathganj II – 61.17%
Sagardighi – 65.27%
Lalbag subdivision
Murshidabad-Jiaganj – 69.14%
Bhagawangola I - 57.22%
Bhagawangola II – 53.48%
Lalgola– 64.32%
Nabagram – 70.83%
Sadar subdivision
Berhampore – 73.51%
Beldanga I – 70.06%
Beldanga II – 67.86%
Hariharpara – 69.20%
Naoda – 66.09%
Kandi subdivision
Kandi – 65.13%
Khargram – 63.56%
Burwan – 68.96%
Bharatpur I – 62.93%
Bharatpur II – 66.07%
Domkol subdivision
Domkal – 55.89%
Raninagar I – 57.81%
Raninagar II – 54.81%
Jalangi – 58.73%
Source: 2011 Census: CD Block Wise
Primary Census Abstract Data

=== Language and religion ===
Religion in Beldanga I CD block (2011)
Islam	78.25%
Hinduism	21.40%
Other or not stated	0.35%

In the 2011 census, Muslims numbered 249,855 and formed 78.25% of the population in Beldanga I CD block. Hindus numbered 68,341 and formed 21.40% of the population. Others numbered 1,126 and formed 0.35% of the population. In Beldanga I and Beldanga II CD blocks taken together while the proportion of Muslims increased from 64.65% in 1991 to 67.95% in 2001, the proportion of Hindus declined from 35.35% in 1991 to 31.91% in 2001.

Murshidabad district had 4,707,573 Muslims who formed 66.27% of the population, 2,359,061 Hindus who formed 33.21% of the population, and 37, 173 persons belonging to other religions who formed 0.52% of the population, in the 2011 census. While the proportion of Muslim population in the district increased from 61.40% in 1991 to 63.67% in 2001, the proportion of Hindu population declined from 38.39% in 1991 to 35.92% in 2001.

Murshidabad was the only Muslim majority district in West Bengal at the time of partition of India in 1947. The proportion of Muslims in the population of Murshidabad district in 1951 was 55.24%. The Radcliffe Line had placed Muslim majority Murshidabad in India and the Hindu majority Khulna in Pakistan, in order to maintain the integrity of the Ganges river system In India.

Bengali is the predominant language, spoken by 99.93% of the population.

== Rural poverty ==
As per the Human Development Report 2004 for West Bengal, the rural poverty ratio in Murshidabad district was 46.12%. Purulia, Bankura and Birbhum districts had higher rural poverty ratios. These estimates were based on Central Sample data of NSS 55th round 1999–2000.

== Economy ==
=== Livelihood ===
In Beldanga I CD block in 2011, amongst the class of total workers, cultivators formed 16.12%, agricultural labourers 30.50%, household industry workers 9.99% and other workers 43.39%.

=== Infrastructure ===
There are 55 inhabited villages in Beldanga I CD block. 100% villages have power supply and drinking water supply. 27 villages (49.09%) have post offices. 54 villages (98.18%) have telephones (including landlines, public call offices and mobile phones). 27 villages (49.09%) have a pucca approach road and 17 villages (30.91%) have transport communication (includes bus service, rail facility and navigable waterways). 2 villages (3.64%) have agricultural credit societies and 6 villages (10.91%) have banks.

=== Agriculture ===
Persons engaged in agriculture
in Beldanga I CD block
1. Bargadars (6.23%)
2. Patta holders (9.76%)
3. Small farmers (5.60%)
4. Marginal farmers (30.5%)
5. Agricultural labourers (47.9%)

From 1977 onwards major land reforms took place in West Bengal. Land in excess of land ceiling was acquired and distributed amongst the peasants. Following land reforms land ownership pattern has undergone transformation. In 2013–14, persons engaged in agriculture in Beldanga I CD Block could be classified as follows: bargadars 4,211 (6.23%,) patta (document) holders 6,602 (9.76%), small farmers (possessing land between 1 and 2 hectares) 3,786 (5.60%), marginal farmers (possessing land up to 1 hectare) 20,622 (30.49%) and agricultural labourers 32,416 (47.93%).

Beldanga I CD block had 59 fertiliser depots, 3 seed stores and 64 fair price shops in 2013–14.

In 2013–14, Beldanga I CD block produced 23,808 tonnes of Aman paddy, the main winter crop from 7,934 hectares, 13,406 tonnes of Boro paddy (spring crop) from 3,728 hectares, 950 tonnes of Aus paddy (summer crop) from 338 hectares, 10,299 tonnes of wheat from 3,645 hectares, 16 tonnes of maize from 6 hectares, 93,732 tonnes of jute from 6,372 hectares and 8,288 tonnes of potatoes from 369 hectares. It also produced pulses and oilseeds.

In 2013–14, the total area irrigated in Beldanga I CD block was 7,967 hectares, out of which 800 hectares were irrigated with canal water, 460 hectares with tank water, 517 hectares by river lift irrigation, 134 hectares by deep tube wells, 76 hectares by shallow tube well and 5,980 hectares by other means.

=== Silk and handicrafts ===
Murshidabad is famous for its silk industry since the Middle Ages. There are three distinct categories in this industry, namely (i) Mulberry cultivation and silkworm rearing (ii) Peeling of raw silk (iii) Weaving of silk fabrics. Prime locations for weaving (silk and cotton) are: Khargram, Raghunathganj I, Nabagram, Beldanga I, Beldanga II and Raninagar-I CD Blocks.

Ivory carving is an important cottage industry from the era of the Nawabs. The main areas where this industry has flourished are Khagra and Jiaganj. 99% of ivory craft production is exported. In more recent years sandalwood etching has become more popular than ivory carving. Bell metal and Brass utensils are manufactured in large quantities at Khagra, Berhampore, Kandi and Jangipur. Beedi making has flourished in the Jangipur subdivision.

=== Banking ===
In 2013–14, Beldanaga I CD block had offices of 9 commercial banks and 4 gramin banks.

=== Backward Regions Grant Fund ===
Murshidabad district is listed as a backward region and receives financial support from the Backward Regions Grant Fund. The fund, created by the Government of India, is designed to redress regional imbalances in development. As of 2012, 272 districts across the country were listed under this scheme. The list includes 11 districts of West Bengal.

== Transport ==
Beldanga I CD block has 6 ferry services and 5 originating/ terminating bus routes.

The Ranaghat-Lalgola branch line was opened in 1905. It passes through this CD block and there are stations at Beldanga railway station and Bhabta railway station.

NH 12 (old number NH 34) passes through this block.

== Education ==
In 2013–14, Beldanga I CD block had 116 primary schools with 17,478 students, 14 middle schools with 2,486 students, 7 high school with 6,900 students and 14 higher secondary schools with 26,814 students. Beldanga I CD Block had 1 general college, 1 technical/ professional institution with 96 students and 437 institutions for special and non-formal education with 18,044 students

In Beldanga I CD block, amongst the 55 inhabited villages, 3 villages did not have a school, 36 villages had more than 1 primary school, 22 villages had at least 1 primary school, 30 villages had at least 1 primary and 1 middle school and 18 villages had at least 1 middle and 1 secondary school.

== Healthcare ==
In 2014, Beldanga I CD block had 1 block primary health centre, 2 primary health centres and 3 private nursing homes with total 41 beds and 10 doctors (excluding private bodies). It had 40 family welfare subcentres. 14,644 patients were treated indoor and 173,676 patients were treated outdoor in the hospitals, health centres and subcentres of the CD Block.

Beldanga I CD block has Beldanga Block Primary Health Centre at PO Beldanga (with 25 beds), Chaitnyapur Primary Health Centre (with 10 beds), and Gopinathpur PHC (with 6 beds).

Beldanga I CD block is one of the areas of Murshidabad district where ground water is affected by high level of arsenic contamination. The WHO guideline for arsenic in drinking water is 10 mg/ litre, and the Indian Standard value is 50 mg/ litre. All but one of the 26 blocks of Murshidabad district have arsenic contamination above the WHO level, all but two of the blocks have arsenic concentration above the Indian Standard value and 17 blocks have arsenic concentration above 300 mg/litre. The maximum concentration in Beldanga I CD block is 1,700 mg/litre.
