= Hariharpara (community development block) =

Hariharpara হরিহরপাড়া
- Community development block
- Interactive map of Hariharpara
- Coordinates: 24.03°N 88.45°E
- Country: India
- State: West Bengal
- District: Murshidabad

Government
  - Type: Federal deomocracy

Area
  - Total: 252.80 km^{2} (97.61 sq mi)
- Elevation: 22 m (72 ft)

Population (2011)
  - Total: 257,571
  - Density: 1,018.9/km^{2} (2,638.9/sq mi)

Languages
  - Official: Bengali, English

Literacy
  - Literacy (2011): 69.20%
- Time zone: UTC+5:30 (IST)
- PIN: 742166 (Hariharpara); 742182 (Choa)
- Telephone/STD code: 03472
- ISO 3166 code: IN-WB
- Vehicle registration: WB-57, WB-58
- Lok Sabha constituency: Murshidabad
- Vidhan Sabha constituency: Hariharpara,
- Website: murshidabad.gov.in

Hariharpara is a community development block that forms an administrative division in the Berhampore subdivision of Murshidabad district in the Indian state of West Bengal.

== Geography ==
Hariharpara is located at 24°02′N 88°27′E

Hariharpara CD block lies in the Ganges-Bhagirathi Basin, which is a long and narrow river valley. The Bhagirathi River splits the district into two natural physiographic regions – Rarh on the west and Bagri on the east. It has fertile soil suitable for cultivation.

The Bagri or the eastern part of the district is a low-lying alluvial plain with the shape of an isosceles triangle. The Ganges/Padma and the Bhagirathi form the two equal sides; the Jalangi forms the entire base; other offshoots of the Ganges meander within the area. It is liable to be flooding by the Bhagirathi and other rivers.

Hariharpara CD block is bounded by Raninagar I CD block in the north, Domkal CD block in the east, Naoda CD block in the south and Berhampore and Beldanga I CD blocks in the west.

Hariharpara CD block has an area of 253.14 km^{2}. It has 1 panchayat samity, 10 gram panchayats, 181 gram sansads (village councils), 63 mouzas and 55 inhabited villages. Hariharpara police station serves this block. Headquarters of this CD block is at Hariharpara.

Gram panchayats of Hariharpara block/ panchayat samiti are: Beharia, Choa, Dharampur, Hariharpara, Humaipur, Khidirpur, Malopara, Raipur, Rukunpur, Swaruppur.

== Demographics ==
=== Population ===
According to the 2011 Census of India, Hariharpara CD block had a total population of 257,571, all of which were rural. There were 131,634 (51%) males and 125,937 (48%) females. The population in the age range 0-6 years numbered 30,693. Scheduled Castes numbered 16,403 (6.37%)and Scheduled Tribes numbered 3,040 (1.18%).

As per 2001 census, Hariharpara block has a total population of 221,701, out of which 114,524 were males and 107,185 were females. Hariharpara block registered a population growth of 19.50 per cent during the 1991-2001 decade. Decadal growth for the district was 23.70 per cent. Decadal growth in West Bengal was 17.84 per cent.

The decadal growth of population in Hariharpara CD block in 2001-2011 was 16.16%.

Decadal Population Growth Rate (%)

- Hariharpara CD block
- Murshidabad district
- West Bengal

=== Villages ===
Large villages in Hariharpara CD block were (2011 census population figures in brackets): Bochadanga (4,260), Raypur (6,203), Masurdanga (4,760), Baruipara (7,663), Khidirpur (6,638), Kismad Imadpur (16,604), Lal Nagar (6,918), Jagannathpur (6,235), Biharia (12,2883), Tehatta (4,713), Pratappur (10,430), Rukunpur (18,663), Hariharpara (14,827), Dasturpara (6,235), Sankarpur (4,721), Lochanmati Dangapara (5,226), Tartipur (8,058), Swaruppur (9,835), Padmanabhpur (8,194), Choa (17,672), Sripur (7,973), Gaznipur (5,936) and Shahjadpur (6,602). Bhajarampur

=== Literacy ===
As per the 2011 census, the total number of literate persons in Hariharpara CD block was 157,008 (69.20% of the population over 6 years) out of which males numbered 81,326 (69.97% of the male population over 6 years) and females numbered 75,682 (68.39% of the female population over 6 years). The gender disparity (the difference between female and male literacy rates) was 1.58%.

See also – List of West Bengal districts ranked by literacy rate

Literacy in CD blocks of
Murshidabad district
Jangipur subdivision
Farakka – 59.75%
Samserganj – 54.98%
Suti I – 58.40%
Suti II – 55.23%
Raghunathganj I – 64.49%
Raghunathganj II – 61.17%
Sagardighi – 65.27%
Lalbag subdivision
Murshidabad-Jiaganj – 69.14%
Bhagawangola I - 57.22%
Bhagawangola II – 53.48%
Lalgola– 64.32%
Nabagram – 70.83%
Sadar subdivision
Berhampore – 73.51%
Beldanga I – 70.06%
Beldanga II – 67.86%
Hariharpara – 69.20%
Naoda – 66.09%
Kandi subdivision
Kandi – 65.13%
Khargram – 63.56%
Burwan – 68.96%
Bharatpur I – 62.93%
Bharatpur II – 66.07%
Domkol subdivision
Domkal – 55.89%
Raninagar I – 57.81%
Raninagar II – 54.81%
Jalangi – 58.73%
Source: 2011 Census: CD Block Wise
Primary Census Abstract Data

=== Language and religion ===
Religion in Hariharpara CD block (2011)
Islam	80.70%
Hinduism	19.04%
Other or not stated	0.26%

In the 2011 census, Muslims numbered 207,860 and formed 80.70% of the population in Hariharpara CD block. Hindus numbered 49,032 and formed 19.04% of the population. Others numbered 679 (0.26% of the population). In Hariharpara CD block while the proportion of Muslims increased from 76.65% in 1991 to 79.35% in 2001, the proportion of Hindus declined from 23.35% in 1991 to 20.50% in 2001.

Murshidabad district had 4,707,573 Muslims who formed 66.27% of the population, 2,359,061 Hindus who formed 33.21% of the population, and 37, 173 persons belonging to other religions who formed 0.52% of the population, in the 2011 census. While the proportion of Muslim population in the district increased from 61.40% in 1991 to 63.67% in 2001, the proportion of Hindu population declined from 38.39% in 1991 to 35.92% in 2001.

Bengali is the predominant language, spoken by 99.68% of the population.

== Rural poverty ==
As per the Human Development Report 2004 for West Bengal, the rural poverty ratio in Murshidabad district was 46.12%. Purulia, Bankura and Birbhum districts had higher rural poverty ratios. These estimates were based on Central Sample data of NSS 55th round 1999-2000.

== Economy ==
=== Livelihood ===
In Hariharpara CD block in 2011, amongst the class of total workers, cultivators formed 27.78%, agricultural labourers 44.59%, household industry workers 6.82% and other workers 20.82%.

=== Infrastructure ===
There are 55 inhabited villages in Hariharpara CD block. 100% villages have power supply and drinking water supply. 19 villages (34.55%) have post offices. 52 villages (94.55%) have telephones (including landlines, public call offices and mobile phones). 23 villages (41.82%) have a pucca approach road and 18 villages (32.73%) have transport communication (includes bus service, rail facility and navigable waterways). 5 villages (9.09%) have agricultural credit societies and 7 villages (12.73%) have banks.

=== Agriculture ===
Persons engaged in agriculture
in Hariharpara CD block
1. Bargadars (5.35%)
2. Patta holders (14.3%)
3. Small farmers (4.01%)
4. Marginal farmers (26.6%)
5. Agricultural labourers (49.7%)

From 1977 onwards major land reforms took place in West Bengal. Land in excess of land ceiling was acquired and distributed amongst the peasants. Following land reforms land ownership pattern has undergone transformation. In 2013-14, persons engaged in agriculture in Harihapara CD block could be classified as follows: bargadars 4,237 (5.35%,) patta (document) holders 11,371 (14.35%), small farmers (possessing land between 1 and 2 hectares) 3,178 (4.01%), marginal farmers (possessing land up to 1 hectare) 21,060 (26.58%) and agricultural labourers 39,400 (49.72%).

Hariharpara CD block had 73 fertiliser depots, 2 seed stores and 52 fair price shops in 2013-14.

In 2013-14, Hariharpara CD block produced 17,353 tonnes of Aman paddy, the main winter crop from 6,200 hectares, 12,990 tonnes of Boro paddy (spring crop) from 3,712 hectares, 1,844 tonnes of Aus paddy (summer crop) from 751 hectares, 39,962 tonnes of wheat from 12,982 hectares, 21 tonnes of maize from8 hectares, 213,511 tonnes of jute from 14,892 hectares, 6,076 tonnes of potatoes from 322 hectares and 68 tonnes of sugar cane from 1 hectare. It also produced pulses and oilseeds.

In 2013-14, the total area irrigated in Hariharpara CD block was 13,077 hectares, out of which 151 hectares were irrigated with tank water, 1,072 hectares by river lift irrigation, 865 hectares by deep tube wells, 16 hectares by shallow tube wells, and 10,973 hectares by other means.

=== Silk and handicrafts ===
Murshidabad is famous for its silk industry since the Middle Ages. There are three distinct categories in this industry, namely (i) Mulberry cultivation and silkworm rearing (ii) Peeling of raw silk (iii) Weaving of silk fabrics.

Ivory carving is an important cottage industry from the era of the Nawabs. The main areas where this industry has flourished are Khagra and Jiaganj. 99% of ivory craft production is exported. In more recent years sandalwood etching has become more popular than ivory carving. Bell metal and Brass utensils are manufactured in large quantities at Khagra, Berhampore, Kandi and Jangipur. Beedi making has flourished in the Jangipur subdivision.

=== Banking ===
In 2013-14, Hariharpara CD block had offices of 6 commercial banks and 4 gramin banks.

=== Backward Regions Grant Fund ===
Murshidabad district is listed as a backward region and receives financial support from the Backward Regions Grant Fund. The fund, created by the Government of India, is designed to redress regional imbalances in development. As of 2012, 272 districts across the country were listed under this scheme. The list includes 11 districts of West Bengal.

== Transport ==
Hariharpara CD block has 16 ferry services and 6 originating/ terminating bus routes. The nearest railway station is 22 km from the CD Block headquarters.

Baharampur-Patikabari Ghat Road passes through this block.

Lochanmati Dangapara Road Passes This Block

== Education ==
In 2013-14, Hariharpara CD block had 123 primary schools with 12,455 students, 20 middle schools with 1,667 students, 6 high school with 5,026 students and 12 higher secondary schools with 24,330 students. Hariharpara CD block had 1 general college with 1,399 students and 367 institutions for special and non-formal education with 18,614 students

Hazi A.K. Khan College was established at Hariharpara in 2008. Affiliated with the University of Kalyani, it offers honours courses in Bengali, English, history and education. In Hariharpara CD Block, amongst the 55 inhabited villages, 2 villages do not have a school, 33 villages have more than 1 primary school, 30 villages have at least 1 primary and 1 middle school and 17 villages had at least 1 middle and 1 secondary school.

== Healthcare ==
In 2014, Hariharpara CD block had 1 block primary health centre, 3 primary health centres and 2 private nursing homes with total 56 beds and 9 doctors (excluding private bodies). It had 37 family welfare subcentres. 5,953 patients were treated indoor and 267,972 patients were treated outdoor in the hospitals, health centres and subcentres of the CD Block.

Hariharpara CD block has Hariharpara Block Primary Health Centre at Hariharpara (with 20 beds), Baharan Primary Health Centre at Baruipara (with 10 beds), Choa PHC (with 6 beds), and Ghoramara-Mahismara PHC at Mahismara (with 6 beds).

Hariharpara CD block is one of the areas of Murshidabad district where ground water is affected by high level of arsenic contamination. The WHO guideline for arsenic in drinking water is 10 mg/ litre, and the Indian Standard value is 50 mg/ litre. All but one of the 26 blocks of Murshidabad district have arsenic contamination above the WHO level, all but two of the blocks have arsenic concentration above the Indian Standard value and 17 blocks have arsenic concentration above 300 mg/litre. The maximum concentration in Hariharpara CD block is 1,160 mg/litre.
