= Rejinagar railway station =

Railway station in West Bengal, India

REJINAGAR
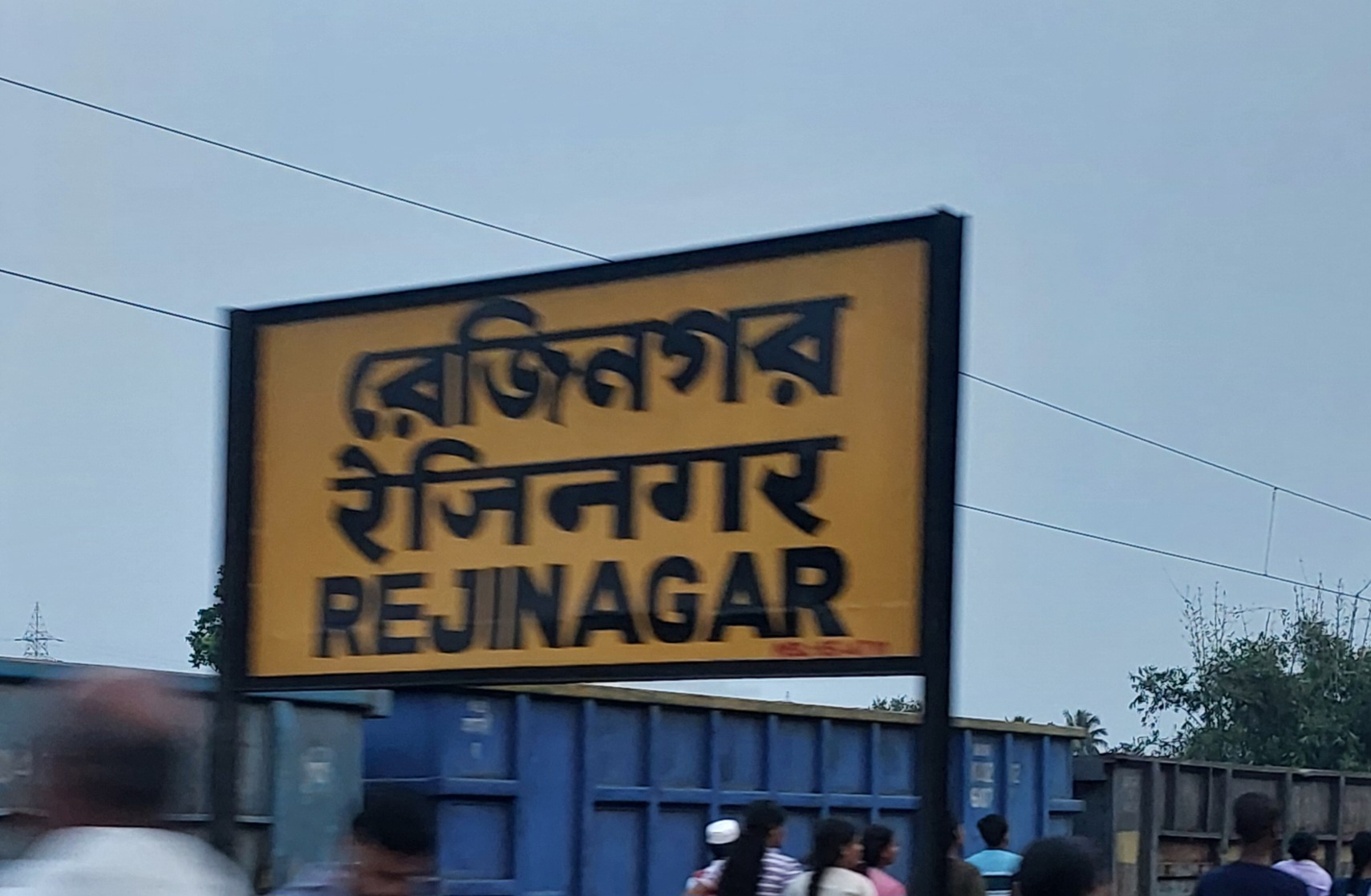
- Rejinagar railway station

General information
- Location: Rejinagar, Murshidabad district, West Bengal; India
- Coordinates: 23.854927°N 88.258295°E
- Elevation: 17 m (56 ft)
- System: Passenger train and Suburban train station
- Owner: Indian Railways
- Operator: Eastern Railway zone
- Line: Sealdah-Lalgola line
- Platforms: 3
- Tracks: 3

Construction
- Structure type: Standard (on-ground station)
- Parking: No

Other information
- Status: Active
- Station code: REJ
- Zone(s): Eastern Railway zone
- Division(s): Sealdah

History
- Former names: East Indian Railway Company

Services
Preceding station	Kolkata Suburban Railway	Following station
Siraj Nagar Halt towards Krishnanagar City Junction	Eastern Line Krishnanagar–Lalgola line	Beldanga towards Lalgola
Route map
Location
- Location within West Bengal Location within India

Rejinagar railway station is a railway station of the Sealdah-Lalgola line in the Eastern Railway zone. The station is situated at Rejinagar, Beldanga II CD Block in Murshidabad district in the Indian state of West Bengal. It serves Rejinagar and the surrounding areas. Lalgola Passengers and EMU pass through the station. The distance between Sealdah and Rejinagar is 159 km.

== Electrification ==
The Krishnanagar–Lalgola section, including Rejinagar railway station was electrified in 2004. In 2010 the line became double tracked.
