= Naoda (community development block) =

Naoda Naoda
- Community development block
- Interactive map of Naoda
- Coordinates: 23.898°N 88.407°E
- Country: India
- State: West Bengal
- District: Murshidabad

Government
  - Type: Federal democracy

Area
  - Total: 230.69 km^{2} (89.07 sq mi)

Population (2011)
  - Total: 226,859
  - Density: 983.39/km^{2} (2,547.0/sq mi)

Languages
  - Official: Bengali, English

Literacy
  - Literacy (2011): 66.09%
- Time zone: UTC+5:30 (IST)
- PIN: 742121 (Amtala); 742162 (Patikabari)
- Telephone/STD code: 03471
- ISO 3166 code: IN-WB
- Vehicle registration: WB-57, WB-58
- Lok Sabha constituency: Berhampur
- Vidhan Sabha constituency: Naoda
- Website: murshidabad.gov.in

Naoda is a community development block that forms an administrative division in the Berhampore subdivision of Murshidabad district in the Indian state of West Bengal.

== Geography ==
Naoda is located at 23°53′53″N 88°24′25″E

Naoda CD block is bounded by Hariharpara CD block in the north, Karimpur I and Karimpur II CD blocks, in Nadia district, in the east, Tehatta II CD block, in Nadia district, in the south and Beldanga II CD block in the west.

Naoda CD block lies in the Ganges-Bhagirathi Basin, which is a long and narrow river valley. The Bhagirathi River splits the district into two natural physiographic regions – Rarh on the west and Bagri on the east. It has fertile soil suitable for cultivation.

The Bagri or the eastern part of the district is a low lying alluvial plain with the shape of an isosceles triangle. The Ganges/Padma and the Bhagirathi form the two equal sides; the Jalangi forms the entire base; other offshoots of the Ganges meander within the area. It is liable to be flooded by the spill of the Bhagirathi and other rivers.

Naoda CD block has an area of 231.39 km^{2}. It has 1 panchayat samity, 10 gram panchayats, 162 gram sansads (village councils), 39 mouzas and 28 inhabited villages. Naoda police station serves this block. Headquarters of this CD block is at Surangapur.

Gram panchayats of Naoda block/ panchayat samiti are: Bali I, Bali II, Chandpur, Kedarchandpur I, Kedarchandpur II, Madhupur, Nawda, Patikabari, Raipur and Sarbangapur.

== Demographics ==
=== Population ===
According to the 2011 Census of India, Nawda CD block had a total population of 226,859, all of it rural. There were 116,341 (51%) males and 110,518 (49%) females. The population below 6 years of age was 27,209. Scheduled Castes numbered 14,804 (6.53%) and Scheduled Tribes numbered 1,526 (0.67%).

As per 2001 census, Naoda block has a total population of 196,021, out of which 100,997 were males and 95,024 were females. Naoda block registered a population growth of 19.14 per cent during the 1991-2001 decade. Decadal growth for the district was 23.70 per cent. Decadal growth in West Bengal was 17.84 per cent.

The decadal growth of population in Naoda CD block in 2001-2011 was 15.60%.

Decadal Population Growth Rate (%)

- Naoda CD block
- Murshidabad district
- West Bengal

=== Villages ===
Large villages in Naoda CD block (2011 census population figures in brackets): Kedarchandpur (8,838), Alampur (6,267), Dakatiapota (2,738), Ramnachandpur (19,452), Dudhsar (4,562), Sarbangapur (13,898), Bali (22,779), Tungi (9,128), Goghata (8,627), Sonatikri (8,982), Bundai Nagar (6,908), Raypur (11,504), Madhupur (20,697), Chandkati (7,046), Gangadhari (5,268), Surangapur (6,343), Jagiapur (6,360), Edrakpur (12,311), Mahammadpur (7,928), Patikabari (11,232) and Chandpur (11,880).

=== Literacy ===
As per the 2011 census, the total number of literates in Naoda CD block was 131,957 (66.09% of the population over 6 years) out of which males numbered 68,595 (66.91% of the male population over 6 years) and females numbered 63,362 (65.24% of the female population over 6 years). The gender disparity (the difference between female and male literacy rates) was 1.67%.

See also – List of West Bengal districts ranked by literacy rate

Literacy in CD blocks of
Murshidabad district
Jangipur subdivision
Farakka – 59.75%
Samserganj – 54.98%
Suti I – 58.40%
Suti II – 55.23%
Raghunathganj I – 64.49%
Raghunathganj II – 61.17%
Sagardighi – 65.27%
Lalbag subdivision
Murshidabad-Jiaganj – 69.14%
Bhagawangola I - 57.22%
Bhagawangola II – 53.48%
Lalgola– 64.32%
Nabagram – 70.83%
Sadar subdivision
Berhampore – 73.51%
Beldanga I – 70.06%
Beldanga II – 67.86%
Hariharpara – 69.20%
Naoda – 66.09%
Kandi subdivision
Kandi – 65.13%
Khargram – 63.56%
Burwan – 68.96%
Bharatpur I – 62.93%
Bharatpur II – 66.07%
Domkol subdivision
Domkal – 55.89%
Raninagar I – 57.81%
Raninagar II – 54.81%
Jalangi – 58.73%
Source: 2011 Census: CD Block Wise
Primary Census Abstract Data

=== Language and religion ===
Religion in Naoda CD block (2011)
Islam	71.87%
Hinduism	27.99%
Other or not stated	0.14%

In the 2011 census, Muslims numbered 163,054 and formed 71.87% of the population in Naoda CD Block. Hindus numbered 63,503 and formed 27.99% of the population. Others numbered 302 and formed 0.14% of the population. In Naoda CD Block while the proportion of Muslims increased from 66.46% in 1991 to 69.67% in 2001, the proportion of Hindus declined from 33.54% in 1991 to 30.24% in 2001.

Murshidabad district had 4,707,573 Muslims who formed 66.27% of the population, 2,359,061 Hindus who formed 33.21% of the population, and 37, 173 persons belonging to other religions who formed 0.52% of the population, in the 2011 census. While the proportion of Muslim population in the district increased from 61.40% in 1991 to 63.67% in 2001, the proportion of Hindu population declined from 38.39% in 1991 to 35.92% in 2001.

Bengali is the predominant language, spoken by 99.94% of the population.

== Rural poverty ==
As per the Human Development Report 2004 for West Bengal, the rural poverty ratio in Murshidabad district was 46.12%. Purulia, Bankura and Birbhum districts had higher rural poverty ratios. These estimates were based on Central Sample data of NSS 55th round 1999-2000.

== Economy ==
=== Livelihood ===
In Naoda CD block in 2011, amongst the class of total workers, cultivators formed 25.57%, agricultural labourers 49.93%, household industry workers 3.08% and other workers 21.72%.

=== Infrastructure ===
There are 28 inhabited villages in Naoda CD block. 100% villages have power supply. 27 villages (97.43%) have drinking water supply. 21 villages (75.00%) have post offices. 26 villages (96.43%) have telephones (including landlines, public call offices and mobile phones). 24 villages (85.71%) have a pucca approach road and 21 villages (75.00%) have transport communication (includes bus service, rail facility and navigable waterways). 14 villages (50.00%) have agricultural credit societies and 11 villages (39.29%) have banks.

=== Agriculture ===
Persons engaged in agriculture
in Naoda CD block
1. Bargadars (3.93%)
2. Patta holders (11.2%)
3. Small farmers (6.53%)
4. Marginal farmers (33.5%)
5. Agricultural labourers (44.8%)

From 1977 onwards major land reforms took place in West Bengal. Land in excess of land ceiling was acquired and distributed amongst the peasants. Following land reforms land ownership pattern has undergone transformation. In 2013-14, persons engaged in agriculture in Naoda CD block could be classified as follows: bargadars 3,241 (3.93%,) patta (document) holders 9,258 (11.23%), small farmers (possessing land between 1 and 2 hectares) 5,388 (6.53%), marginal farmers (possessing land up to 1 hectare) 27,656 (33.54%) and agricultural labourers 36,920 (44.77%).

Naoda CD block had 38 fertiliser depots, 1 seed store and 39 fair price shops in 2013-14.

In 2013-14, Naoda CD block produced 429 tonnes of Aman paddy, the main winter crop from 148 hectares, 1,897 tonnes of Boro paddy (spring crop) from 542 hectares, 6,760 tonnes of Aus paddy (summer crop) from 2,328 hectares, 18,863 tonnes of wheat from 7,007 hectares, 253,332 tonnes of jute from 16,105 hectares and 17,050 tonnes of potatoes from 682 hectares. It also produced pulses and oilseeds.

In 2013-14, the total area irrigated in Naoda CD block was 15,766 hectares, out of which 30 hectares were irrigated with tank water, 950 hectares by river lift irrigation, 536 hectares by deep tube wells, and 14,250 hectares by other means.

=== Silk and handicrafts ===
Murshidabad is famous for its silk industry since the Middle Ages. There are three distinct categories in this industry, namely (i) Mulberry cultivation and silkworm rearing (ii) Peeling of raw silk (iii) Weaving of silk fabrics.

Ivory carving is an important cottage industry from the era of the Nawabs. The main areas where this industry has flourished are Khagra and Jiaganj. 99% of ivory craft production is exported. In more recent years sandalwood etching has become more popular than ivory carving. Bell metal and Brass utensils are manufactured in large quantities at Khagra, Berhampore, Kandi and Jangipur. Beedi making has flourished in the Jangipur subdivision.

=== Banking ===
In 2013-14, Naoda CD block had offices of 9 commercial banks and 2 gramin banks.

=== Backward Regions Grant Fund ===
Murshidabad district is listed as a backward region and receives financial support from the Backward Regions Grant Fund. The fund, created by the Government of India, is designed to redress regional imbalances in development. As of 2012, 272 districts across the country were listed under this scheme. The list includes 11 districts of West Bengal.

== Transport ==
Naoda CD block has 10 ferry services and 2 originating/ terminating bus routes. The nearest railway station is 22 km from the CD Block headquarters.

Baharampur-Patikabari Ghat Road passes through this block.

== Education ==
In 2013-14, Naoda CD block had 109 primary schools with 11,457 students, 12 middle schools with 1,710 students, 3 high school with 1,948 students and 13 higher secondary schools with 24,705 students. Naoda CD block had 1 general with 1,979 students and 332 institutions for special and non-formal with 14,133 students

Jatindra Rajendra Mahavidyalaya was established in 1986 at Amtala. Guru Prasad Biswas and Birendranath Biswas made a handsome contribution, and it was named after the fathers of both the donors. Affiliated with the University of Kalyani, it offers honours courses in Bengali, English, Arabic, history, philosophy, political science and .

In Naoda CD block, amongst the 28 inhabited villages, all villages have at least one primary school, 26 villages have more than 1 primary school, 22 villages have at least 1 primary school and 1 middle school, and 13 villages had at least 1 middle school and 1 secondary school.

== Healthcare ==
In 2014, Naoda CD block had 1 rural hospital, 5 primary health centres and 2 private nursing homes with total 82 beds and 9 doctors (excluding private bodies). It had 32 family welfare subcentres. 20,828 patients were treated indoor and 353,608 patients were treated outdoor in the hospitals, health centres and subcentres of the CD Block.

Naoda CD block has Amtala Rural Hospital at Amtala (with 50 beds), Gangadhari Primary Health Centre (with 10 beds), Sabdarnagar PHC (wth 10 beds), Tungi PHC (with 6 beds), Sarbangapur PHC (with 2 beds) and Patkabari PHC (with 10 beds).

Naoda CD block is one of the areas of Murshidabad district where ground water is affected by high level of arsenic contamination. The WHO guideline for arsenic in drinking water is 10 mg/ litre, and the Indian Standard value is 50 mg/ litre. All but one of the 26 blocks of Murshidabad district have arsenic contamination above the WHO level, all but two of the blocks have arsenic concentration above the Indian Standard value and 17 blocks have arsenic concentration above 300 mg/litre. The maximum concentration in Naoda CD block is 3,003 mg/litre.
