= Kingdom of Gauda =

Classical period Indian subcontinent kingdom

Coordinates: 24.18°N 88.27°E

Kingdom of Gauḍa "Gauṛa Sāmrājya" (Sanskrit) "Gōur sāmrājja" (Old Bengali)
- c. 4th century AD (pre-Gupta); 554–636
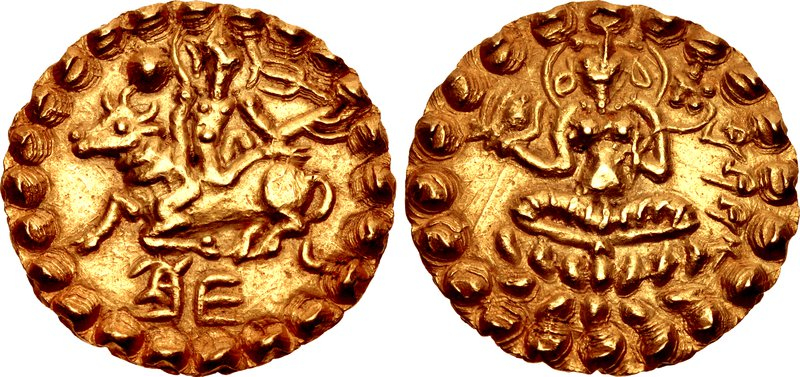
- Coin of Shashanka, king of Gauda, circa 600–635. Samatata type, Assam mint.

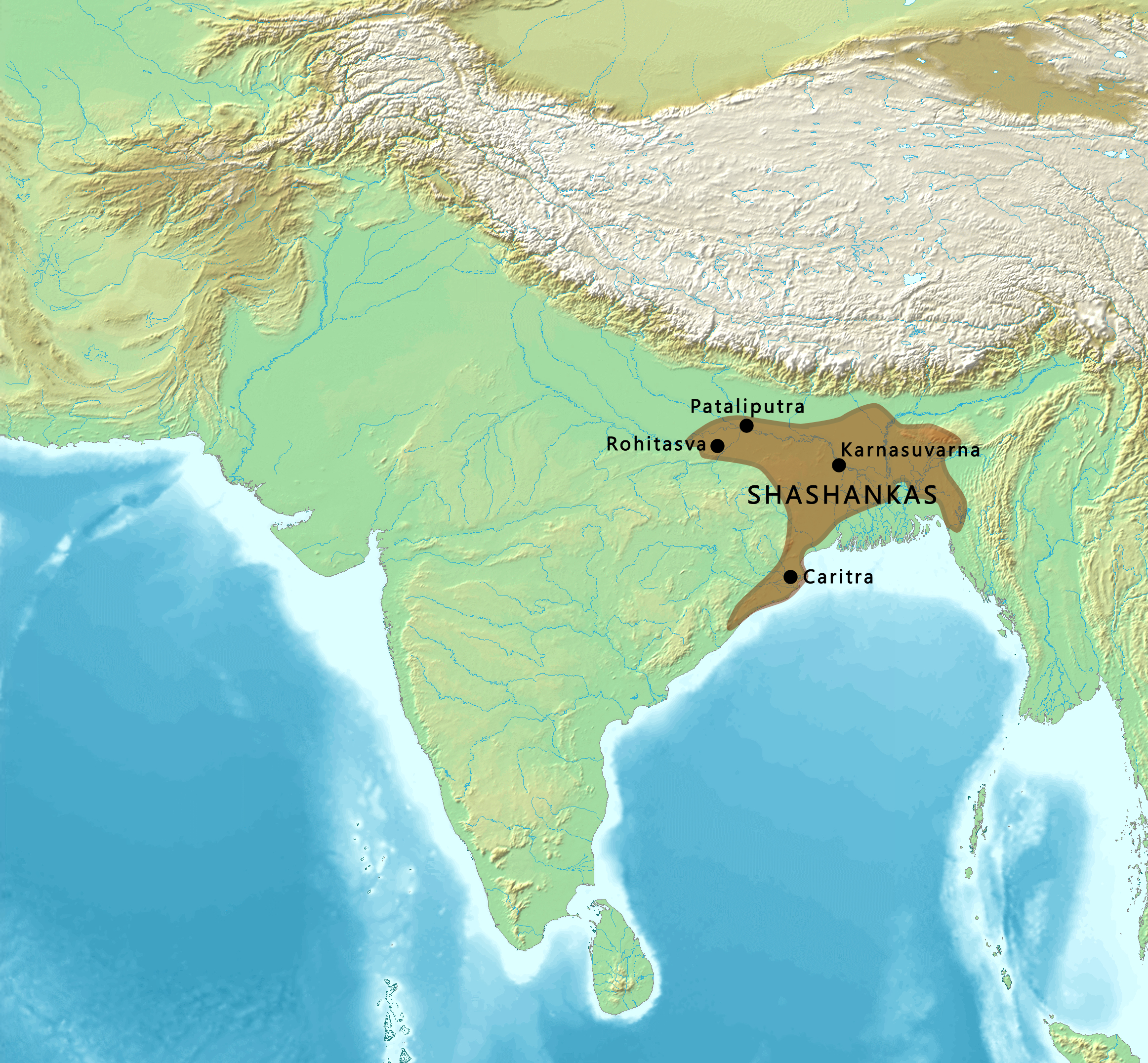
- Map of the Shashankas or "Gauda Kingdom", circa 600 CE.
- Capital: Karnasuvarna
- Religion: Hinduism (Shaivism)
- Government: Monarchy
- Maharajadhiraja
  - 554–593: Jayanaga
  - 593–636: Shashanka
  - 636: Manava
Preceded by
Later Gupta dynasty
Succeeded by
Pushyabhuti dynasty
Mallabhum kingdom
Kamarupa
- Today part of: India; Bangladesh

The Gauḍa kingdom was a kingdom during the Classical era in the Indian subcontinent, which originated in the Gauda region of Bengal (modern-day West Bengal and Bangladesh) in 4th century CE or possibly earlier.

== Location and extent ==
A Buddhist Mahāyāna Text Mañjuśrī-Mūlakalpa records the existence of Gauda kingdom in Bengal before it was replaced by Gupta Empire in the 4th century. King Loka who was born in Vardhamāna (Bardhamān) is mentioned who must have ruled in the early 4th century CE.

King Shashanka is often attributed to expand Gauḍa's influence over Bengal which unified the region under one crown. He reigned in 7th century, and some historians place his rule approximately between 593 and 636. His capital was at Karnasubarna, 9.6 kilometres (6.0 mi) south-west of Baharampur, headquarters of Murshidabad district. The Chinese monk, Xuanzang (Hiuen Tsang) travelled from the country of Karnasubarna to a region in the present-day state of Orissa ruled by Shashanka. There is mention of Pundravardhana being part of Gauda in certain ancient records. Not much is known about the early life of Shashanka. Historian D K Ganguly is reported to have concluded that he was a native of Magadha. The same source reports that the historian Padmanath Bhattacharya took Shashanka to be a son of Mahāsenagupta. R D Banerji concluded that he was descended from the Magadha Guptas. Nagendranath Basu has argued that Shashanka was the son / descendant of Raja Karnadeva, who founded the city of Karnasubarna in Bengal.

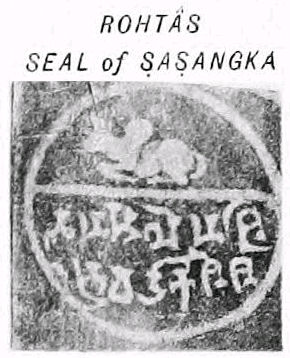
Royal Seal of Shashanka.

Location of the Shahshankas and fragmented South Asian polities circa 600 CE, after the retreat of the Alchon Huns.

In some sources, Shashanka is described as a tribal leader of Bengal. Shashanka's name appears in multiple forms, including Śaśānka and Śaśānka-deva. The name is derived from Sanskrit, as another name for the Moon. Śaśānka-deva therefore loosely translates to "moon god".

The Hindu god Shiva bears the epithet Shashankasekhara, meaning, "he who bears the moon". The Chinese monk Xuanzang's writings, he is mentioned as She-Shang-Kia.. In Sinha's Dynastic History of Magadha, the names 'Śaśānka' and 'Soma' are used interchangeably. Some historians believe that Shashanka began his career as a feudatory chief (maha samanta) under Mahasenagupta, of the Later Gupta Dynasty. And that after the death of Mahasenagupta, Shashanka drove the later Guptas and other prominent nobles out of the region and established his own kingdom with his capital at Karnasubarna. Other historians like Sailendra Nath Sen is of the opinion that Mahasenagupta - already under pressure from the Maukharis (for failing to provide adequate protection) - wouldn't have knowingly appointed Shashanka to such an important position. Middleton (2015) argues in a similar vein that Shashanka served as maha samanta to a Gauda king, possibly Jayanaga. Whether Shashanka was a feudatory under the Maukharis or the Guptas is not known. But he ruled from Karnasuvarna. According to Bana, he was the king of Gauda and was addressed as Maharajadhiraja (king of great kings).Following his death, Shashanka was succeeded by his son, Manava, who ruled the kingdom for eight months. However Gauda was soon divided amongst Harshavardhana and Bhaskarvarmana of Kamarupa, the latter even managing to conquer Karnasuvarna.

Evidence is inconsistent regarding links of Gauda with the Rarh region. While Krishna Mishra (11th or 12th century), in his Prabodha-chandrodaya, mentions that Gauda Rashtra includes Rarh (or Rarhpuri) and Bhurishreshthika, identified with Bhurshut, in Hooghly and Howrah districts, the Managoli inscription of the Yadava king Jaitugi I distinguishes Lala (Rarh) from Gaula (Gauda).

According to Jain writers of the thirteenth and fourteenth centuries, Gauda included Lakshmanavati in present-day Malda district.

The Pala emperors were referred to as Vangapati (Lord of Vanga) and Gaudesvara (Lord of Gauda). Sena kings also called themselves Gaudesvara. From then Gauda and Vanga seem to be interchangeable names for the whole of Bengal. Even, in the early 12th-century Sanskrit text Manasollasa (1129 CE), the name Gauda-Vangala was mentioned to denote the whole Bengal region.

== See also ==
- Gauḍa (city)
- Karnasuvarna
