= Kandi (community development block) =

- Community development block
- Interactive map of Kandi
- Coordinates: 23.95°N 88.03°E
- Country: India
- State: West Bengal
- District: Murshidabad

Government
  - Type: Federal democracy

Area
  - Total: 238.54 km^{2} (92.10 sq mi)
- Elevation: 19 m (62 ft)

Population (2011)
  - Total: 220,145
  - Density: 922.89/km^{2} (2,390.3/sq mi)

Languages
  - Official: Bengali, English

Literacy
  - Literacy (2011): 65.13%
- Time zone: UTC+5:30 (IST)
- PIN: 742137 (Kandi); 742136 (Gokarna); 742171 (Purandarpur)
- Telephone/STD code: 03484
- ISO 3166 code: IN-WB
- Vehicle registration: WB-57, WB-58
- Lok Sabha constituency: Baharampur
- Vidhan Sabha constituency: Kandi
- Website: murshidbad.nic.in

Kandi is a community development block that forms an administrative division in the Kandi subdivision of Murshidabad district in the Indian state of West Bengal.

== Geography ==
Kandi is located at 23°57′N 88°02′E

Kandi CD block is bounded by Khargram CD block in the north, Beldanga II CD block in the east, Bharatpur I CD block in the south and Burwan CD block in the west.

Kandi CD block lies in the Mayurakshi Dwaraka plain in the south-eastern corner of Rarh region in Murshidabad district. The Bhagirathi River splits the district into two natural physiographic regions – Rarh on the west and Bagri on the east. The Rarh region is undulating and contains mostly clay and lateritic clay based soil.

The Rarh region or the western part of the district is drained by the right bank tributaries of the Bhagirathi, flowing down from the hilly / plateau region of Santhal Pargana division in neighbouring Jharkhand. The Farakka Barrage regulates the flow of water into the Bhagirathi through the feeder canal. Thereafter, it is fed with the discharge from the Mayurakshi system. About 1,800 km^{2} of area in the neighbourhood of Kandi town is flooded by the combined discharge of the Mayurakshi, Dwarka, Brahmani, Gambhira, Kopai and Bakreshwar – the main contributor being the Mayurakshi. Certain other areas in the western sector also get flooded.

Kandi CD block has an area of 227.48 km^{2}. It has 1 panchayat samity, 10 gram panchayats, 151 gram sansads (village councils), 93 mouzas and 84 inhabited villages. Kandi police station serves this block. Headquarters of this CD block is at Kandi.

Gram panchayats in Kandi block/ panchayat samiti are: Andulia, Gokarna I, Gokarna II, Hizole, Jasohari Anukha I, Jasohari Anukha II, Kumarsanda, Mahalandi I, Mahalandi II and Purandarpur.

== Demographics ==
=== Population ===
According to the 2011 Census of India Kandi CD block had a total population of 220,145, all of which were rural. There were 112,789 (51%) males and 107,356 (49%) females. The population in the age range 0–6 years was 29,223. Scheduled Castes numbered 35,859 (16.29) and Scheduled Tribes numbered 3,390 (1.54%).

As per 2001 census, Kandi block has a total population of 192,952, out of which 99,636 were males and 93,316 were females. Kandi block registered a population growth of 20.75 per cent during the 1991-2001 decade. Decadal growth for the district was 23.70 per cent. Decadal growth in West Bengal was 17.84 per cent.

The decadal growth of population in Kandi CD block in 2001-2011 was 14.01%, the lowest amongst all CD Blocks in Murshidabad district.

=== Villages ===
Large villages in Kandi CD block were (2011 population figures in brackets): Gatia (5,413), Kumar Sanda (8,320), Khosh Baspur (4,342), Gokarna (16,198), Mahalandi (16,354), Udaychandpur (6,832), Nabagram (6,904), Gobarhati (5,023), Hijal (11,480), Jasohari (9,003) and Sashpara (4,649).

=== Literacy ===
As per the 2011 census, the total number of literate persons in Kandi CD block was 124,346 (65.13% of the population over 6 years) out of which males numbered 70,161 (71.66% of the male population over 6 years) and females numbered 54,185 (58.25% of the female population over 6 years). The gender disparity (the difference between female and male literacy rates) was 13.41%.

See also – List of West Bengal districts ranked by literacy rate

Literacy in CD blocks of
Murshidabad district
Jangipur subdivision
Farakka – 59.75%
Samserganj – 54.98%
Suti I – 58.40%
Suti II – 55.23%
Raghunathganj I – 64.49%
Raghunathganj II – 61.17%
Sagardighi – 65.27%
Lalbag subdivision
Murshidabad-Jiaganj – 69.14%
Bhagawangola I - 57.22%
Bhagawangola II – 53.48%
Lalgola– 64.32%
Nabagram – 70.83%
Sadar subdivision
Berhampore – 73.51%
Beldanga I – 70.06%
Beldanga II – 67.86%
Hariharpara – 69.20%
Naoda – 66.09%
Kandi subdivision
Kandi – 65.13%
Khargram – 63.56%
Burwan – 68.96%
Bharatpur I – 62.93%
Bharatpur II – 66.07%
Domkol subdivision
Domkal – 55.89%
Raninagar I – 57.81%
Raninagar II – 54.81%
Jalangi – 58.73%
Source: 2011 Census: CD Block Wise
Primary Census Abstract Data

=== Language and religion ===
Religion in Kandi CD block (2011)
Islam	60.65%
Hinduism	38.82%
Other or not stated	0.53%

In the 2011 census, Muslims numbered 133,522 and formed 60.65% of the population in Kandi CD block. Hindus numbered 85,464 and formed 38.82% of the population. Others numbered 1,159 and formed 0.53% of the population. In Kandi CD block while the proportion of Muslims increased from 55.14% in 1991 to 58.46% in 2001, the proportion of Hindus declined from 44.71% in 1991 to 41.34% in 2001.

Murshidabad district had 4,707,573 Muslims who formed 66.27% of the population, 2,359,061 Hindus who formed 33.21% of the population, and 37, 173 persons belonging to other religions who formed 0.52% of the population, in the 2011 census. While the proportion of Muslim population in the district increased from 61.40% in 1991 to 63.67% in 2001, the proportion of Hindu population declined from 38.39% in 1991 to 35.92% in 2001.

Languages of Kandi CD block (2011)
1. Bengali (98.7%)
2. Santali (1.23%)
3. Others (0.12%)

At the time of the 2011 census, 98.65% of the population spoke Bengali and 1.23% Santali as their first language.

== Rural poverty ==
As per the Human Development Report 2004 for West Bengal, the rural poverty ratio in Murshidabad district was 46.12%. Purulia, Bankura and Birbhum districts had higher rural poverty ratios. These estimates were based on Central Sample data of NSS 55th round 1999–2000.

== Economy ==
=== Livelihood ===
In Kandi CD block in 2011, amongst the class of total workers, cultivators formed 33.34%, agricultural labourers 42.32%, household industry workers 3.28% and other workers 21.06%.

=== Infrastructure ===
There are 84 inhabited villages in Kandi CD block. 100% villages have power supply and drinking water supply. 20 villages (23.81%) have post offices. 83 villages (98.81%) have telephones (including landlines, public call offices and mobile phones). 27 villages (32.14%) have a pucca approach road and 31 villages (36.90%) have transport communication (includes bus service, rail facility and navigable waterways). 10 villages (11.90%) have agricultural credit societies and 8 villages (9.52%) have banks.

=== Agriculture ===
Persons engaged in agriculture
in Kandi CD block
1. Bargadars (8.56%)
2. Patta holders (10.3%)
3. Small farmers (3.93%)
4. Marginal farmers (28.1%)
5. Agricultural labourers (49.2%)

From 1977 onwards major land reforms took place in West Bengal. Land in excess of land ceiling was acquired and distributed amongst the peasants. Following land reforms land ownership pattern has undergone transformation. In 2013–14, persons engaged in agriculture in Kandi CD block could be classified as follows: bargadars 5,186 (8.56%,) patta (document) holders 6,246 (10.30%), small farmers (possessing land between 1 and 2 hectares) 2,381 (3.93%), marginal farmers (possessing land up to 1 hectare) 17,006 (28.06%) and agricultural labourers 29,796 (49.16%).

Kandi CD Block had 19 fertiliser depots, 1 seed store and 49 fair price shops in 2013–14.

In 2013–14, Kandi CD block produced 99,600 tonnes of Aman paddy, the main winter crop from 30,701 hectares, 37,301 tonnes of Boro paddy (spring crop) from 9,988 hectares, 3,142 tonnes of Aus paddy (summer crop) from 1,009 hectares, 608 tonnes of wheat from 210 hectares, 3,555 tonnes of jute from 353 hectares, 8,300 tonnes of potatoes from 373 hectares and 4,265 tonnes of sugar cane from 54 hectare. It also produced pulses and oilseeds.

In 2013–14, the total area irrigated in Kandi CD block was 3,473 hectares, out of which 200 hectares were irrigated by canal water, 1,595 hectares with tank water, 585 hectares by river lift irrigation, 520 hectares by deep tube wells, and 573 hectares by other means.

=== Silk and handicrafts ===
Murshidabad is famous for its silk industry since the Middle Ages. There are three distinct categories in this industry, namely (i) Mulberry cultivation and silkworm rearing (ii) Peeling of raw silk (iii) Weaving of silk fabrics.

Ivory carving is an important cottage industry from the era of the Nawabs. The main areas where this industry has flourished are Khagra and Jiaganj. 99% of ivory craft production is exported. In more recent years sandalwood etching has become more popular than ivory carving. Bell metal and Brass utensils are manufactured in large quantities at Khagra, Berhampore, Kandi and Jangipur. Beedi making has flourished in the Jangipur subdivision.

=== Banking ===
In 2013–14, Kandi CD block had offices of 8 commercial banks and 2 gramin banks.

=== Backward Regions Grant Fund ===
Murshidabad district is listed as a backward region and receives financial support from the Backward Regions Grant Fund. The fund, created by the Government of India, is designed to redress regional imbalances in development. As of 2012, 272 districts across the country were listed under this scheme. The list includes 11 districts of West Bengal.

== Transport ==
Kandi CD block has 7 ferry services and 16 originating/ terminating bus routes. The nearest railway station is 26 km from the CD block headquarters.

State Highway 11, running from Mahammad Bazar (in Birbhum district) to Ranaghat (in Nadia district) passes through this CD block.

== Education ==
In 2013–14, Kandi CD block had 125 primary schools with 12,978 students, 21 middle schools with 1,527 students, 4 high school with 3,883 students and 10 higher secondary schools with 18,085 students. Kandi CD block had 1 professional/technical institution with 250 students and 376 institutions for special and non-formal education with 18,788 students. There are 2 general colleges in Kandi municipal area, outside Kandi CD block.

In Kandi CD block, amongst the 84 inhabited villages, 2 villages do not have a school, 47 villages have more than 1 primary school, 34 villages have at least 1 primary and 1 middle school and 13 villages had at least 1 middle and 1 secondary school.

== Healthcare ==
In 2014, Kandi CD block had 1 block primary health centre, 3 primary health centres and 1 medical unit of a state government department other than health/ state PSU with total 48 beds and 11 doctors (excluding private bodies). It had 31 family welfare subcentres. 7,651 patients were treated indoor and 206,158 patients were treated outdoor in the hospitals, health centres and subcentres of the CD Block.

Kandi CD block has Gokarna Rural Hospital at Gokarna (with 15 beds), Bahara Primary Health Centre (with 6 beds), Purandarpur PHC (with 10 beds), and Lakshmikantapur PHC (with 2 beds).

Kandi CD block is one of the areas of Murshidabad district where ground water is affected by high level of arsenic contamination. The WHO guideline for arsenic in drinking water is 10 mg/ litre, and the Indian Standard value is 50 mg/ litre. All but one of the 26 blocks of Murshidabad district have arsenic contamination above the WHO level, all but two of the blocks have arsenic concentration above the Indian Standard value and 17 blocks have arsenic concentration above 300 mg/litre. The maximum concentration in Kandi CD block is 140 mg/litre.
