= Karna Subarna railway station =

Railway station in West Bengal, India

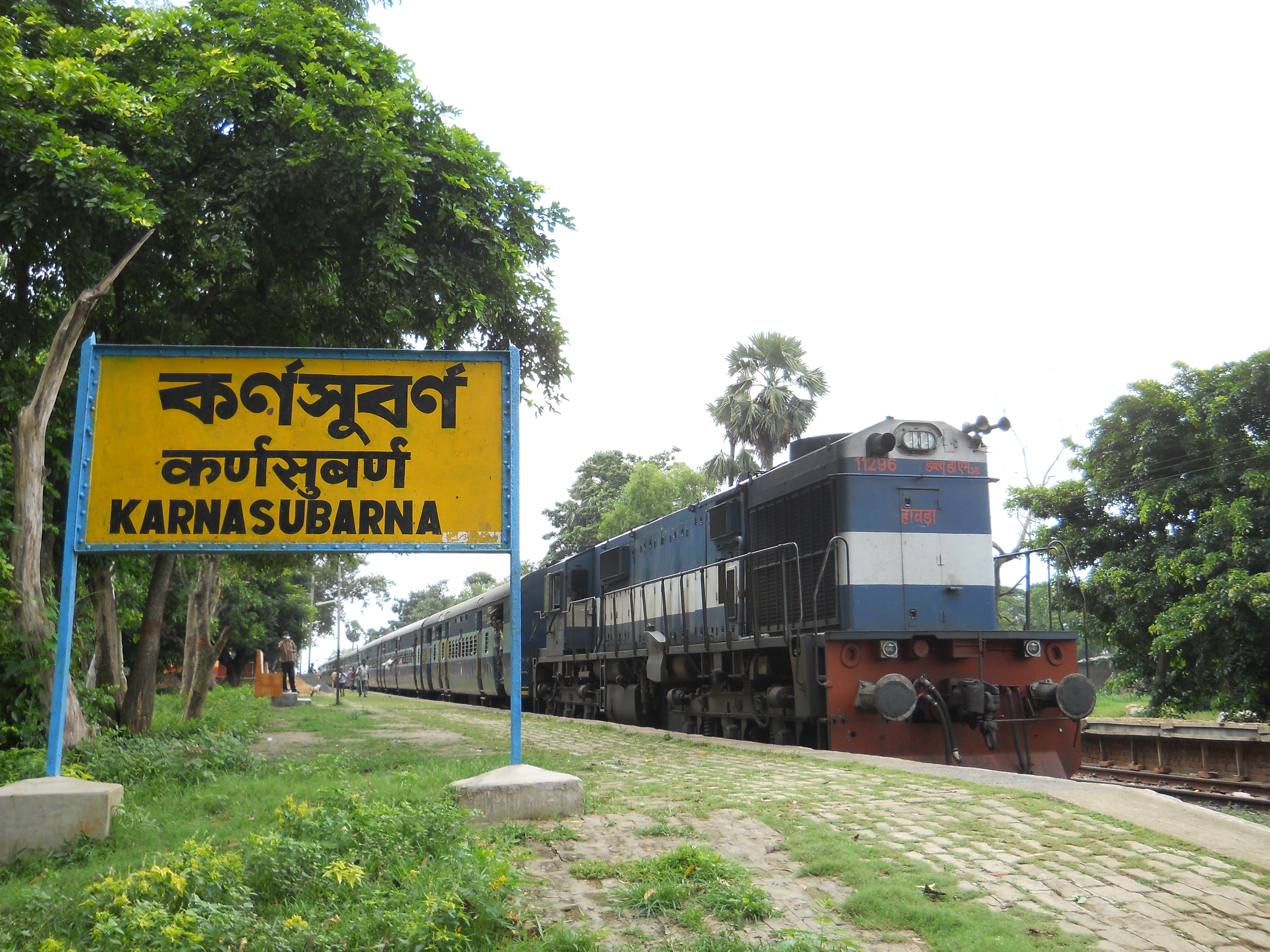
- Train in Karna Subarna railway station

General information
- Location: Karnasuvarna, Murshidabad district, West Bengal; India
- Coordinates: 24°16′45″N 88°06′13″E
- Elevation: 28 m (92 ft)
- System: Passenger train station
- Owner: Indian Railways
- Operator: Eastern Railway zone
- Line: Barharwa–Azimganj–Katwa loop
- Platforms: 4
- Tracks: 4

Construction
- Structure type: Standard (on ground station)
- Parking: yes

Other information
- Status: Active
- Station code: KNSN
- Zone(s): Eastern Railway zone
- Division(s): Howrah

History
- Rebuilt: Yes
- Former names: East Indian Railway Company

Services
Preceding station	Indian Railways	Following station
Jibanti towards ?	Eastern Railway zone Azimganj–Katwa line	Kanthaliya Road towards ?
Location

Karna Subarna railway station is a railway station on the Howrah–Azimganj line of Howrah railway division of Eastern Railway zone. It is located at Arazi Madhupur, Karnasuvarna of Murshidabad district in the Indian state of West Bengal. Earlier this station was known as Chhiruti.

== History ==
In 1913, the Hooghly–Katwa Railway constructed a 5 ft 6 in (1,676 mm) broad gauge line from Bandel to Katwa, and the Barharwa–Azimganj–Katwa Railway constructed the 5 ft 6 in (1,676 mm) broad gauge Barharwa–Azimganj–Katwa loop. With the construction of the Farakka Barrage and opening of the railway bridge in 1971, the railway communication picture of this line were completely changed. Total 26 passengers and local trains stop at Karna Subarna railway station. The rail distance between Karna Subarna and Howrah is approximately 192 km.
