= Berhampore subdivision =

- Subdivision
- Coordinates: 23.40°N 88.50°E
- Country: India
- State: West Bengal
- District: Murshidabad
- Headquarters: Baharampur

Area
  - Total: 1,195.57 km^{2} (461.61 sq mi)

Population (2011)
  - Total: 1,725,525
  - Density: 1,443.27/km^{2} (3,738.04/sq mi)

Languages
  - Official: Bengali, English
- Time zone: UTC+5:30 (IST)
- ISO 3166 code: ISO 3166-2:IN
- Website: wb.gov.in

Berhampore subdivision is an administrative subdivision of Murshidabad district in the state of West Bengal, India.

== Overview ==
The Bhagirathi River splits the district into two natural physiographic regions – Rarh on the west and Bagri on the east. Barhampur subdivision lies in the Ganges-Bhagirathi Basin, which is a long and narrow river valley in the Bagri region. It has fertile soil suitable for cultivation.

== History ==
The ruins of Karnasubarna, the capital of Shashanka, the first important king of ancient Bengal who ruled in the 7th century, is located 9.6 kilometres (6.0 mi) south-west of Baharampur. The famous Chinese scholar Xuanzang mentioned it in his travelogues.

== Geography ==
The headquarters of Murshidabad district are located at Baharampur.

=== Subdivisions ===
Murshidabad district is divided into the following administrative subdivisions:

Subdivision	Headquarters	Area km^{2}	Population (2011)	Rural population % (2011)	Urban population % (2011)
Barhampur	Baharampur	1,195.57	1,725,525	80.15	19.85
Kandi	Kandi	1,200.76	1,155,645	93.21	6.79
Jangipur	Jangipur	1,097.82	1,972,308	56.43	43.57
Lalbag	Murshidabad	1019.10	1,253,886	92.36	7.64
Domkol	Domkol	837.88	996,443	97.55	2.45
Murshidabad district		5,324.00	7,103,807	80.28	19.72

Cities, towns and locations in the Berhampore and Kandi subdivisions, Murshidabad district
M: municipal town, CT: census town, R: rural/ urban centre, H: historical centres
Owing to space constraints in the small map, the actual locations in a larger map may vary slightly

=== Administrative units ===
Barhampur subdivision has 7 police stations, 5 community development blocks, 5 panchayat samitis, 61 gram panchayats, 383 mouzas, 323 inhabited villages, 2 municipalities and 10 census towns. The municipalities are: Baharampur and Beldanga. The census towns are: Goaljan, Kasim Bazar, Banjetia, Shib Danga, Gopjan, Gora Bazar, Ajodhya Nagar, Chaltia, Haridasmati and Barua (P). The subdivision has its headquarters at Baharampur.

=== Police stations ===
Police stations in Barhampur subdivision have the following features and jurisdiction:

Police station	Area covered km^{2}	Municipal town	CD Block
Baharampur	n/a	Baharampur	Berhampore (partly)
Daulatabad	n/a	-	Berhampore (partly)
Beldanga	n/a	Beldanga	Beldanga I
Rejinagar	n/a	-	Beldanga II (partly)
Shaktipur	n/a	-	Beldanga II (partly)
Naoda	n/a	-	Naoda
Hariharpara	n/a	-	Hariharpara

=== Gram Panchayats ===
The subdivision contains 61 gram panchayats under 5 community development blocks:

- Berhampore CD Block - Bhakuri–I, Haridasmati, Niyallispara Goaljan, Rangamati Chandpara, Bhakuri–II, Hatinagar, Radharghat–II, Chhaighari, Madanpur, Radharghat–I, Satui Chaurigachha, Daulatabad, Manindranagar, Rajdharpara, Gurudaspur, Naodapanur and Sahajadpur.
- Beldanga I CD Block - Begunbari, Chaitannapur–II, Mahula–I, Sujapur–Kumarpur, Bhabta–I, Debkundu, Mahula–II, Bhabta–II, Kapasdanga, Mirjapur–I, Chaitannapur–I, Madda and Mirjapur–II
- Beldanga II CD Block - Andulberia–I, Kashipur, Rampara–II, Andulberia–II, Ramnagar Bachhra, Shaktipur, Dadpur, Somepara–I, Kamnagar, Rampara–I and Somepara–II.
- Hariharpara CD Block - Beharia, Hariharpara, Malopara, Swaruppur, Choa, Humaipur, Raipur, Dharampur, Khidirpur and Rukunpur.
- Naoda CD Block - Bali–I, Kedarchandpur–I, Naoda, Sarangpur, Bali–II, Kedarchandpur–II, Patikabari, Chandpur, Madhupur and Raipur.

=== Blocks ===
Community development blocks in Barhampur subdivision are:

CD Block	Headquarters	Area km^{2}	Population (2011)	SC %	ST %	Muslims %	Hindus %	Decadal Growth Rate 2001-2011 %	Literacy rate %	Census Towns
Berhampore	Baharampur	314.19	446,817	17.22	2.42	53.63	45.94	17.95	73.51	9
Beldanga I	Sarulia	168.75	319,322	3.95	0.08	78.25	21.40	23.18	70.06	1
Beldanga II	Shaktipur	207.93	250,458	8.33	0.22	61.82	38.05	19.16	67.86	-
Naoda	Surangapur	231.39	226,859	6.53	0.67	71.87	27.99	15.60	66.09	-
Hariharpara	Hariharpara	253.14	257,571	6.37	1.18	80.70	19.04	16.16	69.20	-

== Economy ==
=== Infrastructure ===
All inhabited villages in Murshidabad district are connected to the national electricity grid.

See the individual block pages for more information about the infrastructure.

=== Agriculture ===
Murshidabad is a predominantly agricultural district. A majority of the population depends on agriculture for a living. The land is fertile. The eastern portion of the Bhagirathi, an alluvial tract, is very fertile for growing Aus paddy, jute and rabi crops. The Kalantar area in the south-eastern portion of the district, is a low-lying area with stiff dark clay and supports mainly the cultivation of Aman paddy. The west flank of the Bhagirathi is a lateritic tract intersected by numerous bils and old river beds. It supports the cultivation of Aman paddy, sugar cane and mulberry.

Given below is an overview of the agricultural production (all data in tonnes) for Barhampur subdivision, other subdivisions and the Murshidabad district, with data for the year 2013–14.

CD Block/ Subdivision	Rice	Wheat	Jute	Pulses	Oil seeds	Potatoes	Sugarcane
Berhampore	81,199	22,533	227,638	1,072	8,887	4,405	79
Beldanga I	38,164	10,299	93,732	343	12,101	8,288	-
Beldanga II	107,951	17,434	126,538	157	6,396	4,095	160,074
Naoda	9,086	18,863	253,332	2,119	597	17,050	-
Hariharpara	32,187	39,962	213,551	2,067	7,334	6,076	78
Barhampur subdivision	268,587	109,091	914,791	5,758	35,315	39,914	160,221
Kandi subdivision	487,207	4,157	6,186	4,818	9,355	85,886	106,646
Jangipur subdivision	207,472	45,261	207,425	9,374	12,375	38,197	52,344
Lalbag subdivision	68,034	20,304	427,450	7,809	22,592	40,997	3,295
Domkol subdivision	80,899	109,518	730,393	16,755	33,410	117,082	25,023
Murshidabad district	1,112,199	288,331	2,286,245	44,514	113,047	322.076	347,529

== Education ==
Murshidabad district had a literacy rate of 66.59% (for population of 7 years and above) as per the census of India 2011. Barhampur subdivision had a literacy rate of 72.60%, Kandi subdivision 66.28%, Jangipur subdivision 60.95%, Lalbag subdivision 68.00% and Domkal subdivision 68.35%.

Given in the table below (data in numbers) is a comprehensive picture of the education scenario in Murshidabad district for the year 2013-14:

Subdivision	Primary School		Middle School		High School		Higher Secondary School		General College, Univ		Technical / Professional Instt		Non-formal Education	
Subdivision	Institution	Student	Institution	Student	Institution	Student	Institution	Student	Institution	Student	Institution	Student	Institution	Student
Barhampur	728	88,371	107	13,364	37	31,214	92	162,613	7	17,418	11	2,796	2,278	100,164
Kandi	672	66,030	105	11,248	46	32,752	61	87,482	5	7,830	3	400	1,717	74,370
Jangipur	747	144,416	72	14,159	25	30,004	76	194,025	5	15,335	5	500	2,793	160,236
Lalbag	601	72,429	74	8,997	24	22,174	66	120,454	5	13,088	7	759	2,082	93,891
Domkol	432	52,177	73	11,791	22	23,201	47	86,672	3	7,211	11	2,457	1,612	74,330
Murshidabad district	3,180	423,423	431	59,559	154	139,345	342	651,246	25	60,882	37	6,912	10,482	502,991

Note: Primary schools include junior basic schools; middle schools, high schools and higher secondary schools include madrasahs; technical schools include junior technical schools, junior government polytechnics, industrial technical institutes, industrial training centres, nursing training institutes etc.; technical and professional colleges include engineering colleges, medical colleges, para-medical institutes, management colleges, teachers training and nursing training colleges, law colleges, art colleges, music colleges etc. Special and non-formal education centres include sishu siksha kendras, madhyamik siksha kendras, centres of Rabindra mukta vidyalaya, recognised Sanskrit tols, institutions for the blind and other handicapped persons, Anganwadi centres, reformatory schools etc.

The following institutions are located in Barhampur subdivision:

- Murshidabad University was established at Berhampore in 2021.
- Krishnath College was established at Baharampur in 1853. In addition to undergraduate courses it offers post-graduate courses in physiology, sericulture and Sanskrit.
- Berhampore College, was initially founded in 1963 as Raja Krishnath College of Commerce, and was renamed in 1975. It is located in Baharampur.
- Berhampore Girls' College was established at Baharampur in 1946.
- Government College of Engineering & Textile Technology, Berhampore was established at Baharampur in 1928.
- Murshidabad College of Engineering & Technology was established at Baharampur in 1998.
- Central Sericultural Research and Training Institute is a research station conducted by the Central Silk Board, Ministry of Textiles, Government of India, established at Baharampur in 1943. It conducts a regular post-graduate course in sericulture and tailor-made courses.
- Murshidabad Medical College and Hospital was established at Baharampur in 2012.
- Hazi A.K. Khan College was established at Hariharpara in 2008.
- Sewnarayan Rameswar Fatepuria College was established at Beldanga in 1965.
- Jatindra Rajendra Mahavidyalaya was established in 1986 at Amtala.
- Union Christian Training College was established at Baharampur in 1938. Affiliated with the West Bengal University of Teachers' Training, Education Planning and Administration for its BEd course, and with the University of Kalyani for its BPEd course.
- Monarch College of Art and Technology, is a private college at Baharampur offering courses in animation film making and ceramic design.

== Healthcare ==
The table below (all data in numbers) presents an overview of the medical facilities available and patients treated in the hospitals, health centres and sub-centres in 2014 in Murshidabad district.

Subdivision	Health & Family Welfare Deptt, WB				Other State Govt Deptts	Local bodies	Central Govt Deptts / PSUs	NGO / Private Nursing Homes	Total	Total Number of Beds	Total Number of Doctors*	Indoor Patients	Outdoor Patients
Subdivision	Hospitals	Rural Hospitals	Block Primary Health Centres	Primary Health Centres	Other State Govt Deptts	Local bodies	Central Govt Deptts / PSUs	NGO / Private Nursing Homes	Total	Total Number of Beds	Total Number of Doctors*	Indoor Patients	Outdoor Patients
Berhampore	2	2	4	15	3	-	-	45	71	1,645	282	149,393	2,094,027
Kandi	1	2	3	17	1	-	-	6	30	567	68	85,624	1,005,056
Jangipur	1	1	6	15	-	-	2	12	37	590	62	141,427	1,043,548
Lalbag	1	2	3	14	-	1	1	23	45	483	65	105,562	1,154,275
Domkal	1	2	2	9	-	-	-	19	33	252	44	45,110	802,309
Murshidabad district	6	9	18	70	4	1	3	105	216	2,537	521	527,116	6,099,215

.* Excluding nursing homes

Medical facilities in Barhampur subdivision are as follows:

Hospitals: (Name, location, beds)

- Murshidabad District Hospital, Baharampur, 391 beds
- Baharampur General Hospital, Baharampur, 225 beds (running as part of Murshidabad District Hospital)
- Baharampur Central Jail Hospital, Baharampur, 87 beds
- Baharampur Police Hospital, Baharampur, 68 beds
- Borstal Jail Hospital, Baharampur, 10 beds
- Mental Hospital, Baharampur, 350 beds

Rural Hospitals: (Name, block, location, beds)

- Beldanga Rural Hospital, Beldanga Municipality, Beldanga, 30 beds
- Amtala Rural Hospital, Naoda CD Block, Amtala, 50 beds
- Saktipur Rural Hospital, Beldanga II, Shaktipur, 30 beds

Block Primary Health Centres: (Name, block, location, beds)

- Beldanga BPHC, Beldanga I CD Block, Beldanga, 25 beds
- Hariharpara BPHC, Hariharpara CD Block, Hariharpara, 20 beds
- Karnasuvarna BPHC, Berhampre CD Block, Karnasuvarna, 15 beds

Primary Health Centres: (CD Block-wise)(CD Block, PHC location, beds)

- Beldanga I CD Block: Chaitanyapur (10), Gopinathpur (6)
- Beldanga II CD Block: Ramnagar-Bachra, Bachra (10), Sompara (4), Andulberia, Nazirpur (10)
- Naoda CD Block: Gangadhari (10), Sabdarnagar (10), Tungi (6), Sarbangapur (2), Patkabari (10)
- Hariharpara CD Block: Baharan, Baruipara (10), Choan (6), Ghoramara-Mahismara, Mahismara (6)
- Berhampore CD Block: Chourigachha, Satui (10), Hatinagar (10)

== Electoral constituencies ==
Lok Sabha (parliamentary) and Vidhan Sabha (state assembly) constituencies in Barhampur subdivision were as follows:

Lok Sabha constituency	Reservation	Vidhan Sabha constituency	Reservation	CD Block and/or Gram panchayats and/or municipal areas
Baharampur	None	Bharatpur	None	Bharatpur II CD Block, and Alugram, Amlai, Bharatpur, Sijgram and Talgram GPs of Bharatpur I CD Block
		Rejinagar	None	Beldanga II CD Block, and Begunbari, Kapasdanga and Mirjapur I GPs of Beldanga I CD Block
		Beldanga	None	Beldanga municipality, Bhabta I, Bhabta II, Debkundu, Mirjapur II, Mahula I and Sujapur Kumarpur GPs of Beldanga I CD Block, and Bhakuri II, Haridasmati, Naoda Panur, Rajdharpara and Rangamati Chandpara GPs of Berhampore CD Block
		Baharampur	None	Baharampur municipality, and Bhakuri I, Daulatabad, Gurudaspur, Hatinagar and Manindranagar GPs of Berhampore CD Block
		Naoda	None	Naoda CD Block and Chaitannapur I, Chaitannapur II, Madda and Mahula II GPs of Beldanga I CD Block
		Burwan in Kandi subdivision	Reserved for SC	Biprasekhar, Burwan I, Burwan II, Kharjuna, Kuli, Kurunnorun, Panchthupi, Sabaldaha, Sabalpur, Sahora and Sundarpur gram panchayats of Burwan community development block and Gadda, Jajan and Gundiria GPs of Bharatpur I CD Block
		Kandi in Kandi subdivision	None	Kandi municipality, Kandi CD Block, and Satui Chaurigachha GPs of Berhampore CD Block
Murshdiabad	None	Hariharpara	None	Hariharpara CD Block and Chhaighari and Madanpur GPs of Berhampore CD Block
		1 assembly segment in Lalbag subdivision and 5 assembly segments in Domkal subdivision		
Jangipur	None	Nabagram in Lalbag subdivision	Reserved for SC	Nabagram CD Block, and Niyallishpara Goaljan, Radharghat I, Radharghat II and Sahajadpur GPs of Berhampore CD Block
		4 assembly segment in Jangipur subdivision, 2 assembly segments in Lalbag subdivision and 1 assembly segment in Kandi subdivision		
