= Karnasuvarna =

Ancient capital city in West Bengal, India

- Kānsonā
- Karnasubarna
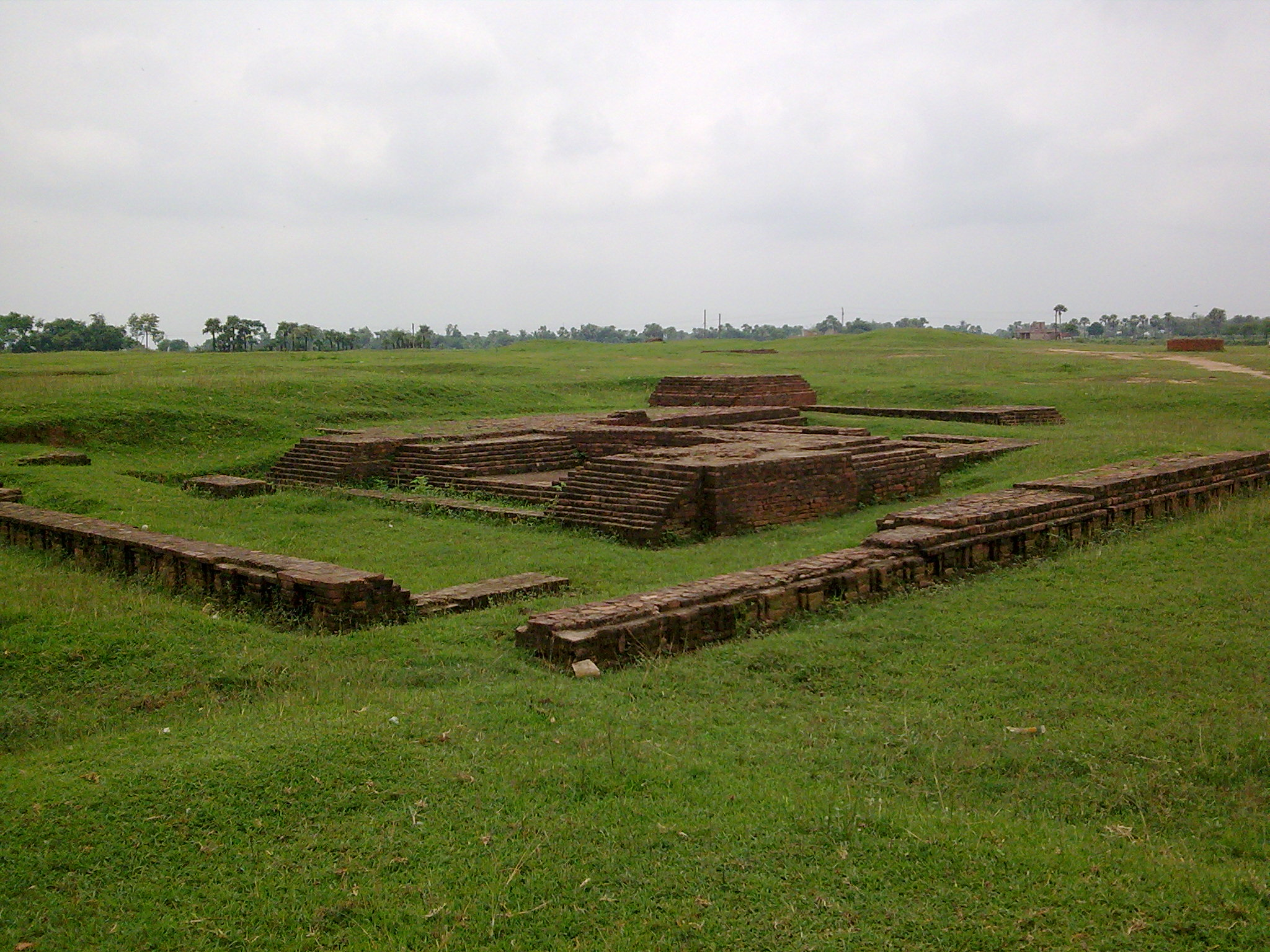
- Remains of Raktamrittika Vihara, c. 600 CE

- Location within West Bengal
- 24°01′49″N 88°11′27″E
- Type: Settlement
- Location: West Bengal, India

History
- Built: 7th century AD

Site notes
- Excavation dates: 1929–30, 1962
- Archaeologists: K. N. Dixit; S. R. Das
- Owner: Archaeological Survey of India, University of Calcutta

Karnasuvarna or Karnasubarna (Bengali : কর্ণসুবর্ণ or কানসোনা, lit. "Golden-Ear"/ "Gold-Ear") was an ancient city, located in the present day Berhampore CD block in the Berhampore subdivision of Murshidabad district, West Bengal, India. It was the capital of Gauda Kingdom.

== Geography ==
Cities, towns and locations in the Berhampore and Kandi subdivisions, Murshidabad district
M: municipal town, CT: census town, R: rural/ urban centre, H: historical centres
Owing to space constraints in the small map, the actual locations in a larger map may vary slightly

=== Area overview ===
The area shown in the map alongside, covering Berhampore and Kandi subdivisions, is spread across both the natural physiographic regions of the district, Rarh and Bagri. The headquarters of Murshidabad district, Berhampore, is in this area. The ruins of Karnasubarna, the capital of Shashanka, the first important king of ancient Bengal who ruled in the 7th century, is located 9.6 kilometres (6.0 mi) south-west of Berhampore. The entire area is overwhelmingly rural with over 80% of the population living in the rural areas.

Note: The map alongside presents some of the notable locations in the subdivisions. All places marked in the map are linked in the larger full screen map.

== History ==
Karnasuvarna (meaning 'made beautiful by Karna' or 'Gold of Ear', for 'karna' also means ear, and 'suvarna' means both beautiful and Gold, as evident from the Bangla name 'Kānsonā', where 'Kān' is ear and 'sonā' is Gold) was the capital of Gauda Kingdom during the reign of Raja Shashanka, the first important king of ancient Bengal who ruled in the 7th century. karnasuvarna was also known as KanaSona (কানাসুনা) by local people. According to folklore, it was the capital of Mahabharata king Karna. After Shashanka's death it was the Jayaskandhavara (camp of victory) of Bhaskaravarman, the king of Kamarupa probably for a short period. This is evident from his Nidhanpur copper-plate grant. In the mid-7th century, it was the capital of Jayanaga according to his Vappa Ghoshavata copper-plate grant. The ruins of Karnasuvarna have been located at Kansona in the present Murshidabad district in the Indian state of West Bengal. It is 9.6 kilometres (6.0 mi) south-west of Berhampore, headquarters of Murshidabad district.

In the List of Monuments of National Importance in West Bengal the following are shown as ASI listed monuments:

- Mounds known as Devil’s Mound and Raja Karna’s Palace at Rangamati (Item No. 118).
- Nil Kuthi Mound at Mouza Chowk, Chandpara (Item No. 128).

== Excavations at Rajbaridanga ==
The famous Chinese traveler Xuanzang mentioned in his travelogues about Lo-to-mo-chi (Raktamrittika) Mahavihara, an important centre of learning of Vajrayana Buddhists near Karnasuvarna. It has been identified with Rajbaridanga. The archaeological site of Rajbaridanga is about 2.4 km from Karnasuvarna railway station in the bank of the Bhagirathi River. Local transport like cycle vans, e-rickshaws (Toto) are available. This site was first excavated by a team from the Department of Archaeology, University of Calcutta in 1962 under the direction of S.R. Das. Amongst the findings, the most significant one was a monastic sealing bearing the legend Shri Rakta(m)rttika (Ma)havaiharik arya bhikshu (samgha)s(y)a (of the community of venerable monks residing in the Shri Raktamrittika Mahavihara). The other significant findings are terracotta figurines and ornamental stucco mouldings including human heads. Two other sites close by have been excavated at Rakshashidanga (in 1929–30 by K.N. Dixit of the Archaeological Survey of India) and Nil Kuthi.

=== Rakshasi Danga and Rajbari Danga ===
Mounds locally known as Rakshasi Danga (Demoness’ Ground) and Rajbari Danga (Raja’s Palace Ground) have been excavated by the Archaeological Survey of India and the Archaeological Department of the University of Calcutta. The discovery of terracotta seals “bearing the legend Raktamrittika Mahavihara has identified the location of the monastery bearing the same name described in the accounts of Hiuen Tsang”, Chinese Buddhist monk and scholar who visited the place in the 7th century AD. The entire area contains “vestiges of ancient remains” from 2nd century AD to 15-16th century AD.

=== Nilkuthi Mound ===
Nilkuthi Mound, adjacent to Rajbari Danga, is at a higher level, has yielded antiquities sporadically.

== Transport ==
Karna Subarna railway station (earlier known as Chiruti) is on the Barharwa-Azimganj-Katwa loop of Eastern Railway.

Bus services are available to district headquarters Baharampur from Karnasubarna.

== Healthcare ==
Karnasuvarna Block Primary Health Centre, with 15 beds, is a government medical facility in Berhampore CD block.

== Gallery ==
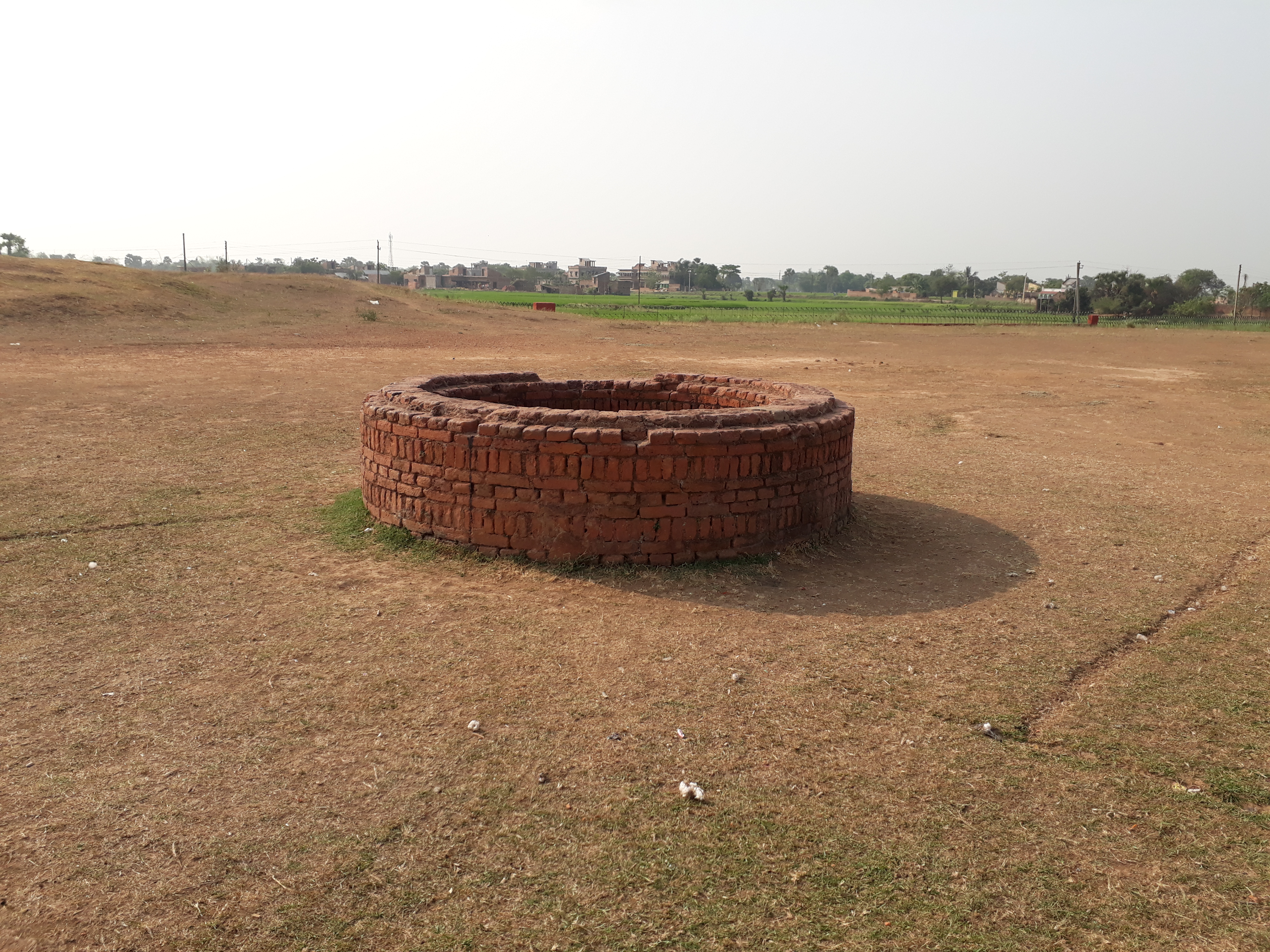
Well, Archaeological site of Karnasuvarna

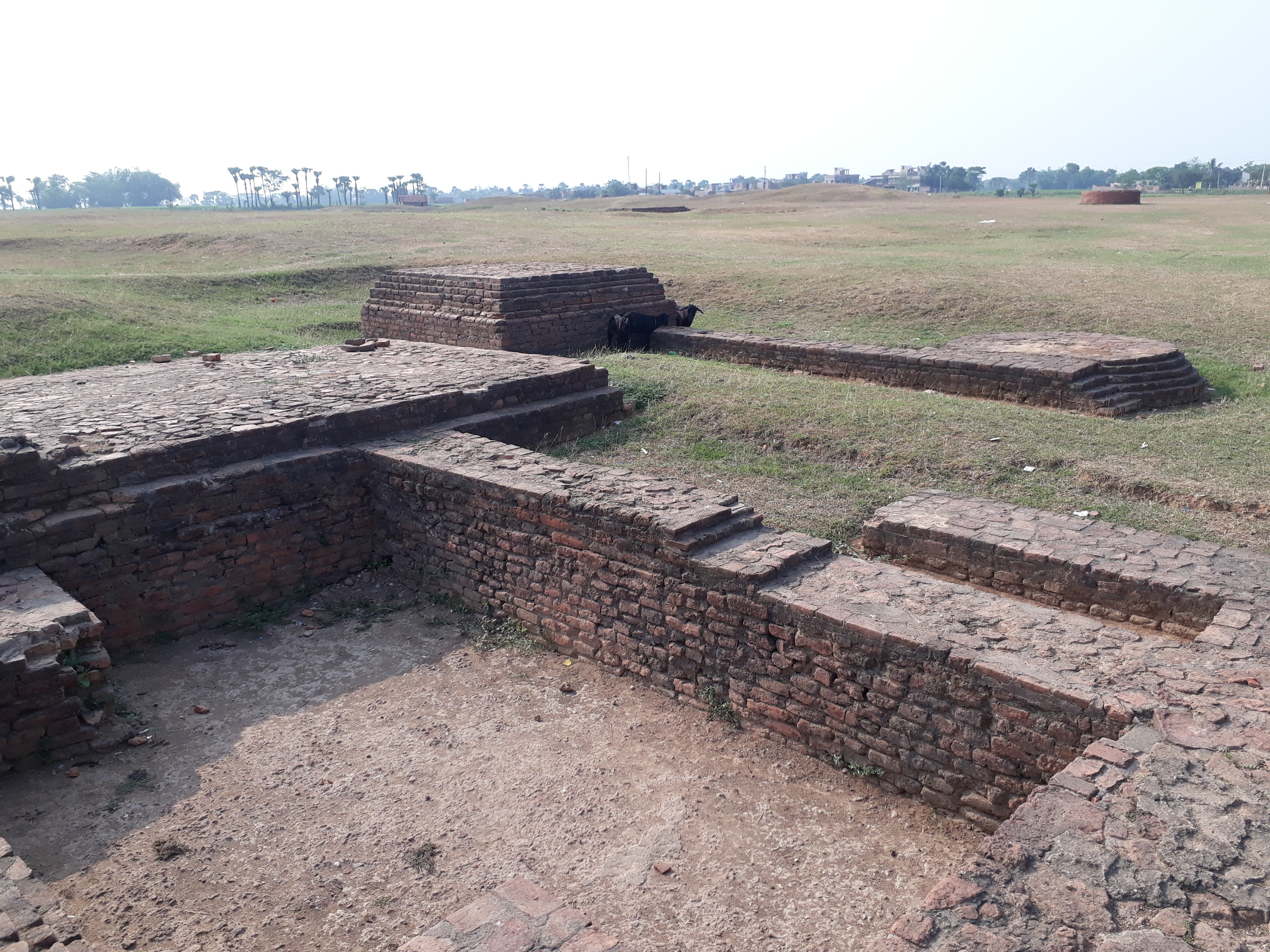
Karnasuvarna, Rajbari Danga

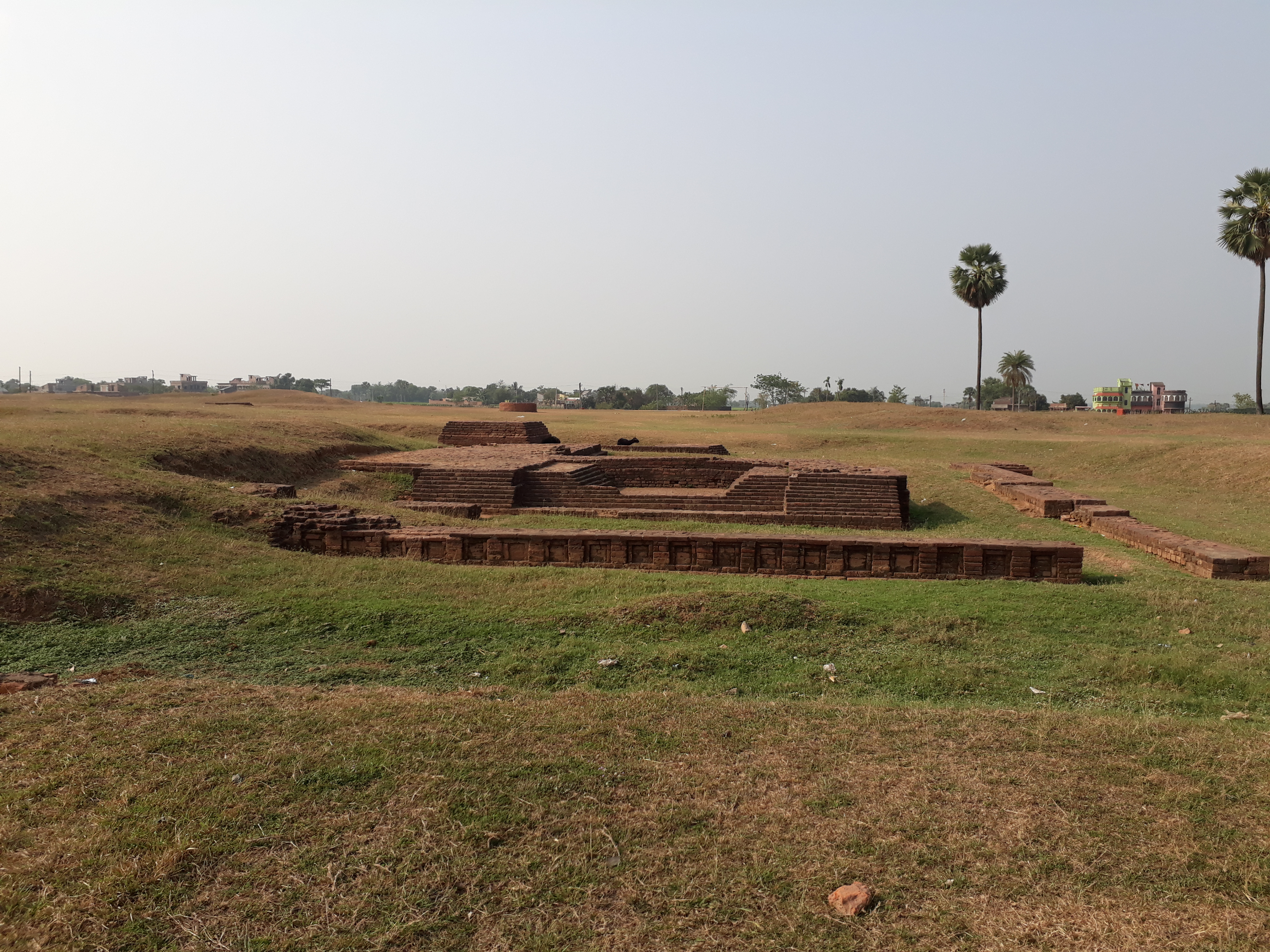
Karnasuvarna ground

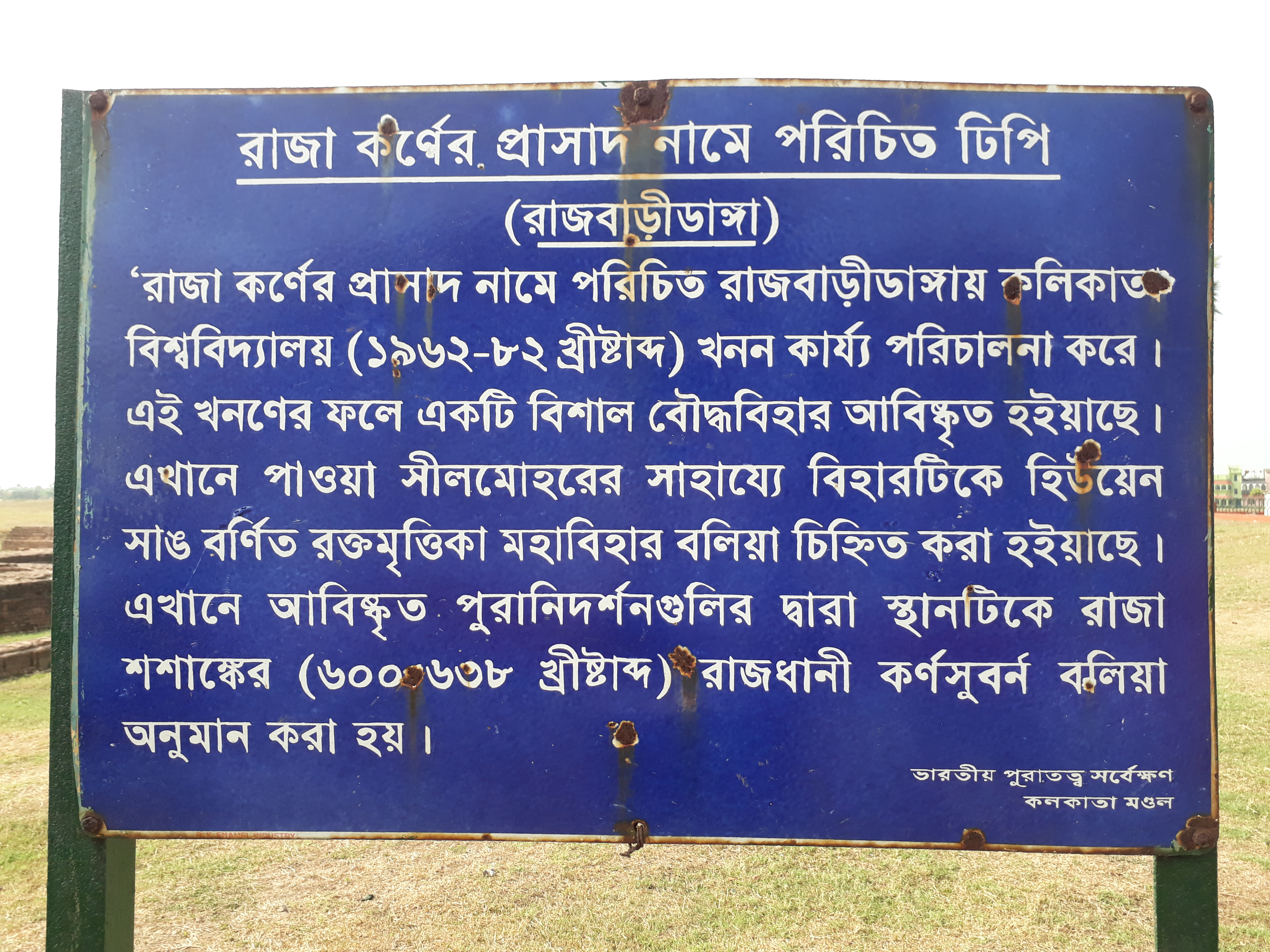
ASI Board at karnasuvarna
