= Ranaghat–Krishnanagar City–Lalgola line =

Railway Route in West Bengal, India

Ranaghat–Krishnanagar City–Lalgola line (including Shantipur loop line)
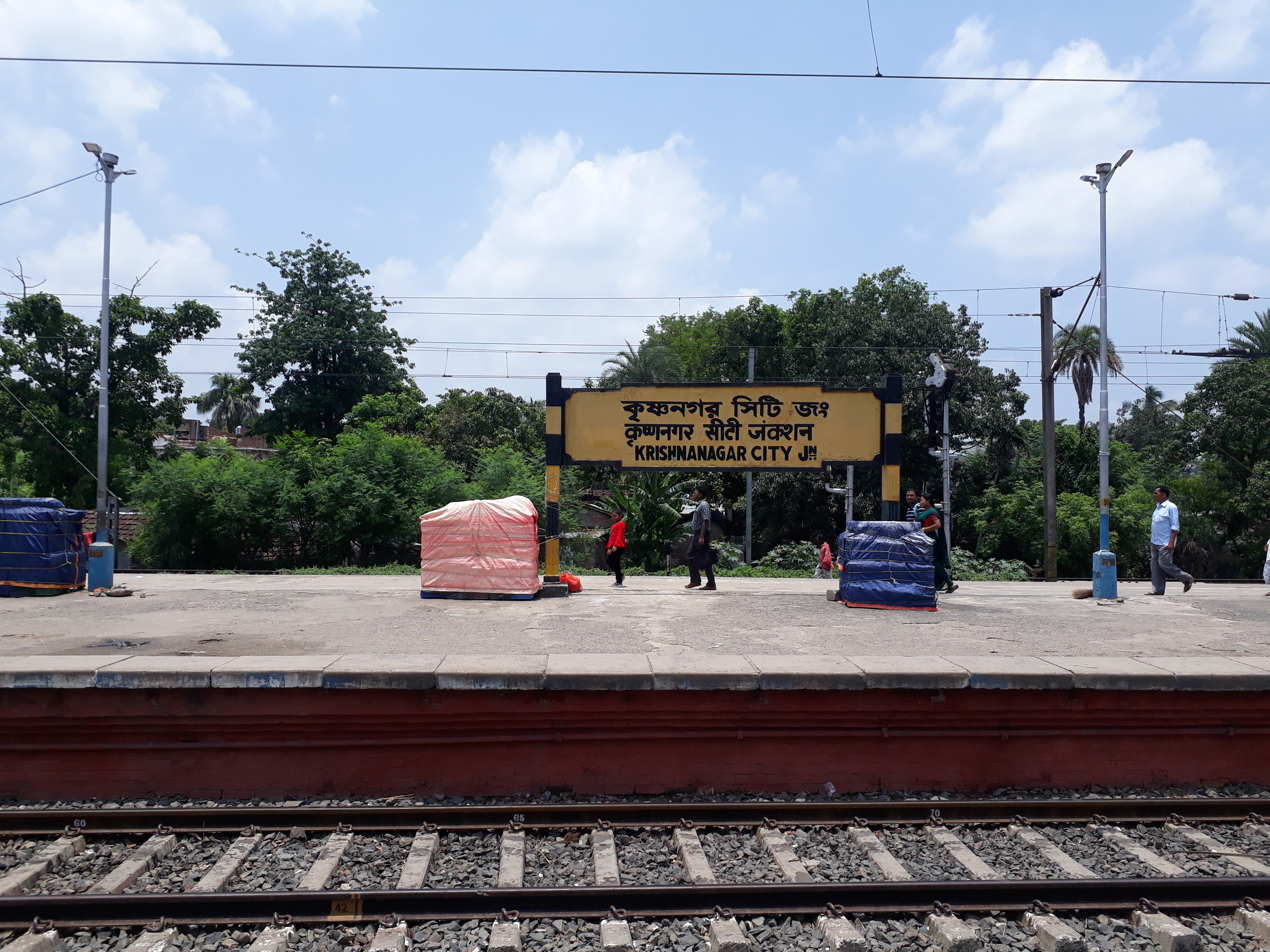
- Krishnanagar City Junction railway station

Overview
- Status: Operational
- Owner: Indian Railway
- Locale: West Bengal
- Termini: Ranaghat; Lalgola
- Stations: 35

Service
- System: Electrified
- Operator: Eastern Railway
- Depot: Ranaghat EMU Carshed

History
- Opened: 1899; 127 years ago (Aistala Ghat–Shantipur–Krishnanagar City NG line); 1905; 121 years ago (Ranaghat–Krishnanagar City–Krishnapur BG line)

Technical
- Line length: 155 km (96 mi) - Ranaghat–Krishnanagar City–Lalgola; 36 km (22 mi) - Ranaghat–Shantipur–Krishnanagar City
- Number of tracks: 2
- Track gauge: 5 ft 6 in (1,676 mm) broad gauge
- Old gauge: 2 ft 6 in (762 mm) - Aistala Ghat–Nabadwip Ghat section
- Electrification: Yes
- Operating speed: up to 110 km/h (68 mph)

The Ranaghat–Krishnanagar City–Lalgola line is a 155 km (96 mi) long broad gauge railway line which connects Ranaghat Junction in the Nadia district with Lalgola in the Murshidabad district of the Indian state of West Bengal. The line runs up to the Bangladesh border near the Ganga river and is a part of the Sealdah railway division of the Eastern Railway zone.

== Services ==
There are three express services, which connect Lalgola with Kolkata (Hazarduari Express and Dhano Dhanye Express) and Sealdah (Bhagirathi Express), that traverse the entire length of the line connecting major towns like Krishnanagar, Beldanga, Berhampore and Murshidabad in between. These services are further augmented by locomotive hauled passenger trains that stop at every station on the line. In 2012, daily MEMU services were started between Sealdah and Lalgola.

With the opening of the Nashipur Rail Bridge, the section was directly connected to the B.B loop line and the Howrah–New Jalpaiguri line allowing a shorter alternative connection between Kolkata and Siliguri. As such a new Humsafar Express between Sealdah and Jalpaiguri Road was launched on 20 June 2025 along this route. The Kolkata–Sairang Express, the first train between Kolkata and Aizawl was also launched on 13 September 2025 along this route and quickly became popular within weeks of its launch.

The Ranaghat–Krishnanagar City section along with the Kalinarayanpur–Shantipur–Krishnanagar City loop line is a part of the suburban section of the Kolkata Suburban Railway linking with the system at Ranaghat Junction. The Sealdah–Ranaghat–Krishnanagar City section is served with total pairs of 231 Daily and 187 Sunday EMU services. There are also 3 pairs of EMU services between Ranaghat and Krishnanagar via the Shantipur Loop line. Shantipur is further connected to Bangaon via the Ranaghat–Bangaon branch line with 2 pairs of daily EMU services.

A majority of the Sealdah–Ranaghat–Krishnanagar City section is served by 9-car EMU rakes from the Narkeldanga EMU Carshed. The Ranaghat EMU Carshed, commissioned in 2007, mainly serves the Bangaon–Ranaghat–Shantipur–Krishnanagar City section and the Ranaghat–Lalgola section, where EMU services were introduced from 2017, with 12-car EMU and MEMU rakes.

== History ==
=== Pre–Partition ===
==== Ranaghat–Krishnanagar Light Railway ====
While the main line of the eastern section of the Eastern Bengal Railway (reporting mark :EBR) was opened from Calcutta to Kushtia via Ranaghat in 1862, it bypassed Krishnanagar and Shantipur, two very prominent heritage centers of art, culture and learning of the 18th and 19th century Bengal. To resolve this issue, Martin's Light Railways (reporting mark :MLR) constructed a 20.25 mi (32.59 km) long, 2 ft 6 in narrow gauge line from Aistala Ghat, on the west bank of the Churni river, near Ranaghat to Krishnanagar via Shantipur in 1899 which was known as the Ranaghat–Krishnanagar Light Railway. EBR further constructed a 1.6 mi (2.6 km) long broad gauge line from Ranaghat station to Churni Ghat, known as the Churni Extension railway, from where a direct ferry connection to Aistala Ghat was established. The administration of the Ranaghat–Krishnanagar Light Railway passed onto EBR in 1904.

==== Murshidabad Branch Railway ====
EBR opened the Ranaghat–Murshidabad–Bhagwangola–Krishnapur branch line in 1905. This was known as the Murshidabad Branch Railway. This was further extended to Lalgola Ghat on the south bank of the Ganges in 1907 and the line came to be known as the Lalgola Ghat Branch Railway. In 1909, a metre gauge line from Katihar to Godagari Ghat (on the north bank of the Ganges), known as the Godagari Ghat Branch Railway was built, from where a ferry connection was established to Lalgola Ghat, thus providing a direct link from Katihar to Calcutta.

==== Further extensions ====
in 1925. a broad gauge extension was built from Churni Bridge (present day Kalinarayanpur Junction railway station) to Shantipur thus establishing direct connectivity from Sealdah to Shantipur. This made the Aistala Ghat–Shantipur section and the Churni Extension Railway redundant following which they were dismantled and the line was known as Shantipur–Krishnanagar Light Railway.

The Shantipur–Krishnanagar Light Railway was extended up to Nabadwip Ghat on the east bank of the Bhagirathi river, in 1926 and a direct ferry connection was established to Nabadwip Dham, an important pilgrimage centre of Bengal.

In 1928, a 2.01 mi (3.23 km) long branch line was constructed from Azimganj on the B.B. loop line to the Nashipur Road station on the Ranaghat–Lalgola line via a bridge across the Bhagirathi river for carrying stone freight traffic. This bridge was destroyed in the Second World War, leading to connectivity problems between the twin cities of Azimganj and Jiaganj located on the opposite sides of the Bhagirathi river.

=== Post-partition ===
Following the partition of India in 1947, the link between Sealdah and Katihar via this line was snapped affecting the connection of South Bengal with North Bengal, North Bihar and Assam due to which the ferry connection was moved to between Sakrigali Ghat railway station in the Sahibganj Loop to Manihari Ghat railway station in the Katihar–Teznarayanpur branch line. The Katihar–Singhabad section was converted to broad gauge in 1962 with the construction of the new Howrah–New Jalpaiguri line.

The line along with other EBR lines came under the jurisdiction of the Sealdah railway division of the Eastern Railway post zonal re-organisation in 1952.

==== Gauge conversion & Nabadwip Dham Connection ====
The Shantipur–Krishnanagar City narrow gauge line was sanctioned for gauge conversion to broad gauge in 2001. The line closed for gauge conversion in 2010 which was completed and the new line was commissioned on 7 February 2012.

The Krishnanagar–Nabadwip Ghat section was sanctioned for gauge conversion in 2007 along with a planned extension of the line to Nabadwip Dham on the B.B. loop line with a bridge over the Bhagirathi. While the gauge conversion of the section was completed from Krishnanagar City to Amghata railway station it was not commissioned because of unauthorized crossings, while the stretch between Amghata and Nabadwip Ghat has been blocked due to a temple and a mosque being on the alignment. Similarly, while the superstructure of the bridge between the Nabadwip Ghat and Nabadwip Dham railway stations over the Bhagirathi is ready, tracks leading to the bridge haven't been built because of land acquisition problems and protests by the locals.

On 15 October 2023, a trial run of a goods train was conducted between the Krishnanagar City Junction and Amghata railway stations in order to check the heath of the unutilized section of the new gauge converted line. It was planned to short terminate trains at Amghata till the land acquisition problems between the Amghata–Nabadwip Ghat section are sorted out. The Krishnanagar City–Amghata section was finally commissioned for operations on 17 November 2025.

==== Nashipur rail bridge ====
A new railway bridge between Azimganj and Murshidabad, across the Bhagirathi river was sanctioned in 2001 owing to the long time demand of the people of the area. While the superstructure of the bridge was completed by 2013, since the approach roads couldn't be built due to land acquisition problems and local protests related to employment, the tracks leading to the bridge couldn't be constructed.

The hurdles related to land acquisition & employment were finally cleared & work for laying the tracks was started in December 2022. Track renewal work by replacing the old railway panels was underway as of September 2023 and the entire work was expected to be completed by March 2024. Meanwhile, the area near the bridge had become a popular picnic spot.

The bridge was finally inaugurated on 2 March 2024 by Prime Minister Narendra Modi and multiple passenger services were launched via the bridge, finally connecting the twin cities of Jiaganj Azimganj by rail, in October 2024.

Once commissioned, the Indian Railways planned to use the bridge for North Bengal bound trains from Sealdah like Darjeeling Mail as it provided a shorter route between Sealdah and New Jalpaiguri leading to significant savings in cost and time. This plan finally came into fruition on 20 June 2025 when a new Humsafar Express between Sealdah and Jalpaiguri Road was launched along this route. The Kolkata–Sairang Express, the first train between Kolkata and Aizawl was also launched on 13 September 2025 along this route as well and quickly became popular within weeks of its launch.

== Track ==
The Ranaghat–Krishnanagar City–Lalgola section along with the Ranaghat–Shantipur section is a double line section while the Shantipur–Krishnanagar City section is a single line section.

== Electrification ==
The Ranaghat–Krishnanagar City and the Ranaghat–Shantipur section were electrified in 1963–64. The 128 km (80 mi) long Krishnanagar City–Lalgola stretch was electrified in 2007. The single electrified line of the Shantipur–Krishnanagar City section was commissioned after gauge conversion in 2012.

== EMU Carsheds ==
The Ranaghat–Krishnanagar City section of the line is primarily served by 9-car EMU rakes from the Narkeldanga EMU Carshed with a few 12-car EMU rakes from Ranaghat EMU Carshed as well. Further to this most 12-car EMU rakes from Ranaghat EMU Carshed serve in the Ranaghat–Lalgola section and the Krishnanagar City–Shantipur–Ranaghat–Bangaon section. The Ranaghat EMU Carshed also maintains 12-car MEMU rakes which started serving from Sealdah to Lalgola in 2012.

While the section was initially served by the Narkeldanga EMU carshed which opened on 1963, due to the increasing traffic requirements in the Ranaghat–Gede, Ranaghat–Bangaon, Ranaghat–Shantipur–Krishnanagar City and Ranaghat–Lalgola sections owing to the electrification and gauge conversions of various lines, the Ranaghat EMU carshed was commissioned in 2007. EMU services were introduced between Ranaghat and Lalgola in 2017.

As of January 2024, the Narkeldanga carshed had 28 9-car EMU rakes, a few of which served the Sealdah South section mostly via the Circular line, while rest served the Sealdah North section lines. The Ranaghat EMU carshed contains 1 9-car EMU rake, 16 12-car EMU rakes (of which 1 is a 3 phase EMU) and 8 12-car MEMU rakes. 4 of the 12-car MEMU rakes are three phase MEMU.

== Routes and stations ==
=== Stations ===
Names in bold indicate that the station is a major stop or an important interchange/terminal station.
Names in italics indicate that the station is now defunct

==== Ranaghat–Krishnanagar City–Lalgola main line ====
Ranaghat–Krishnanagar City–Lalgola main line
#	Distance from Ranaghat Junction (km)	Station Name	Station Code	Existing Connections	Station Category
1	0	**Ranaghat Junction**	RHA	Ranaghat–Bangaon line / Sealdah–Ranaghat–Gede line	**SG-2**
2	4	Kalinarayanpur Junction	KLNP	Shantipur loop line	SG-3
3	8	Birnagar	BIJ	–	SG-3
4	11	Taherpur	THP	–	SG-3
5	16	Badkulla	BDZ	–	SG-3
6	21	Jalal Khali Halt	JKL	–	HG-2
7	26	**Krishnanagar City Junction †**	KNJ	Shantipur loop line	**SG-2**
8	33	Bahadurpur	BPD	–	NSG-6
9	39	Dhubulia	DHU	–	NSG-6
10	44	Muragachha	MGM	–	NSG-6
11	54	Bethuadahari	BTY	–	NSG-5
12	58	Sonadanga	SVH	–	NSG-6
13	66	Debagram	DEB	–	NSG-5
14	71	Paglachandi	PCX	–	NSG-6
15	77	Plassey	PLY	–	NSG-5
16	82	Sirajnagar	SRJN	–	HG-2
17	86	Rejinagar	REJ	–	NSG-5
18	95	**Beldanga**	BEB	–	**NSG-4**
19	101	Bhabta	BFT	–	NSG-6
20	104	Sargachhi	SGV	–	NSG-6
21	108	New Balarampur Halt	NBPH	–	HG-3
22	113	**Berhampore Court**	BPC	–	**NSG-3**
23	116	Cossimbazar	CSZ	–	NSG-5
24	124	**Murshidabad Junction**	MBB	Azimganj Jn. Link Line	**NSG-4**
25	129	Nashipur Road	NSO	–	–
26	132	Jiaganj	JJG	–	NSG-5
27	137	Subarnamrigi	SBNM	–	HG-2
28	144	Bhagwangola	BQG	–	NSG-5
29	147	Pirtala	PRTL	–	HG-1
30	153	Krishnapur	KRP	–	NSG-5
31	155	**Lalgola**	LGL	–	NSG-5
32	160	Lalgola Ghat	LGG	–	–
† End of suburban section of Kolkata Suburban Railway

==== Shantipur loop line ====
Shantipur loop line
#	Distance from Ranaghat Junction (km)	Station Name	Station Code	Existing Connections	Station Category
1	0	**Ranaghat Junction**	RHA	Ranaghat–Bangaon line / Sealdah–Ranaghat–Gede line	**SG-2**
2	4	Kalinarayanpur Junction	KLNP	Ranaghat–Lalgola line	SG-3
3	8	Habibpur	HBE	–	SG-3
4	12	Phulia	FLU	–	SG-3
5	16	Bathna Krittibas	BTKB	–	HG-3
6	21	**Shantipur Junction**	STB	–	SG-3
8	27	Dignagar	DTG	–	HG-3
7	33	**Krishnanagar City Junction †**	KNJ	Ranaghat–Lalgola line	**SG-2**
† End of suburban section of Kolkata Suburban Railway

== Planned extensions ==
=== Krishnanagar–Karimpur–Berhampore line ===
There have been multiple demands for a new railway line from Krishnanagar to Berhampore via Karimpur and Domkal, two major towns in the Nadia and Murshidabad districts of West Bengal. While multiple surveys have been conducted for the proposed railway line since 1905, it was not sanctioned for construction. In January 2023, the Indian Ministry of Railways has given an approval to start survey work on the Krishnanagar–Karimpur railway line again, at a cost of Rs.2 crore. As per the plans, the survey work started in August 2023.

Two new railway line projects, Dhubulia–Charatala and Krishnanagar City–Chapra have been sanctioned in the railway budget in 2001 and 2002 respectively. While the final line survey for both the newly planned lines have been completed, there has been no further progress made in the project.

== Gallery ==
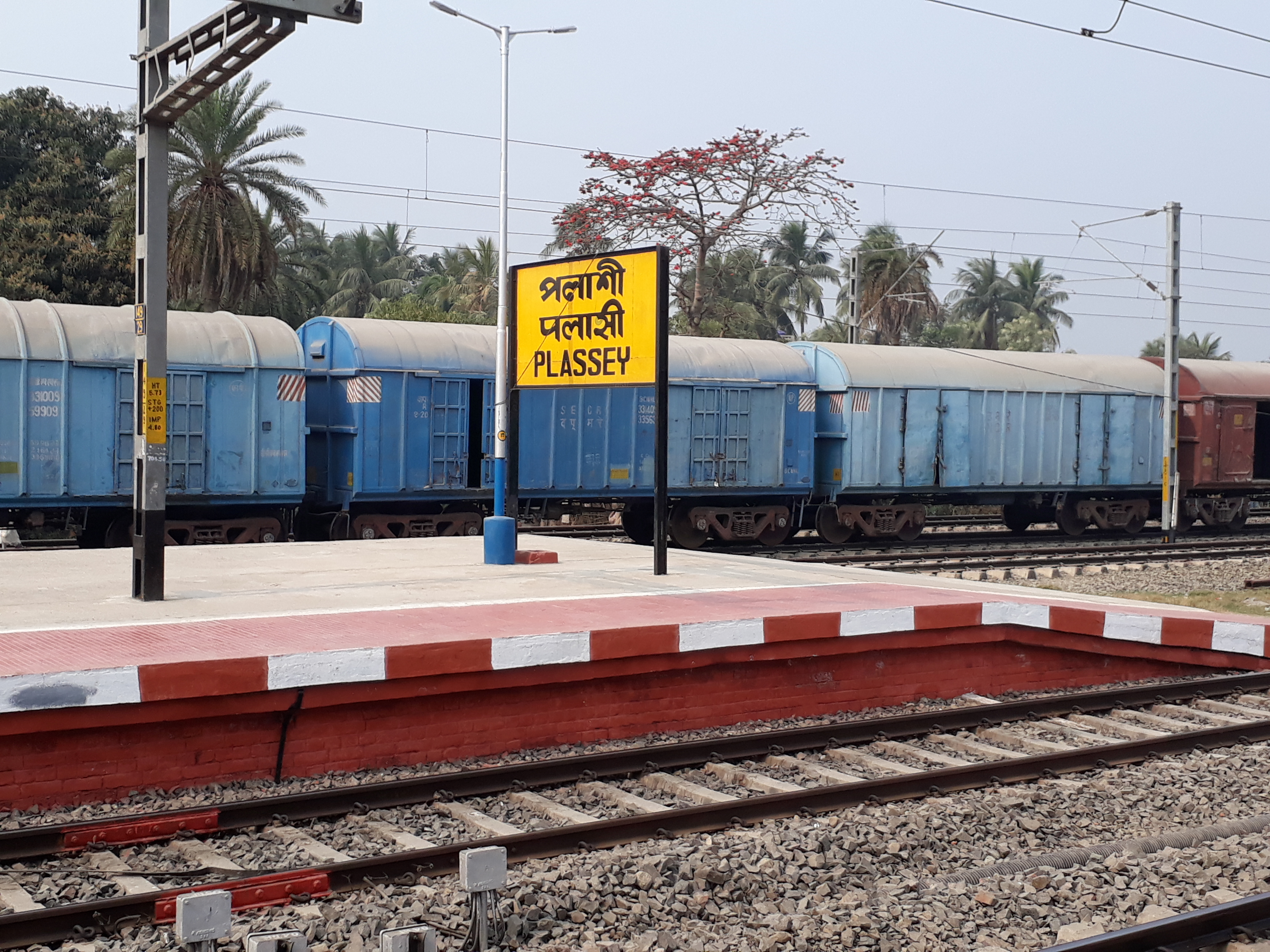
Plassey railway station

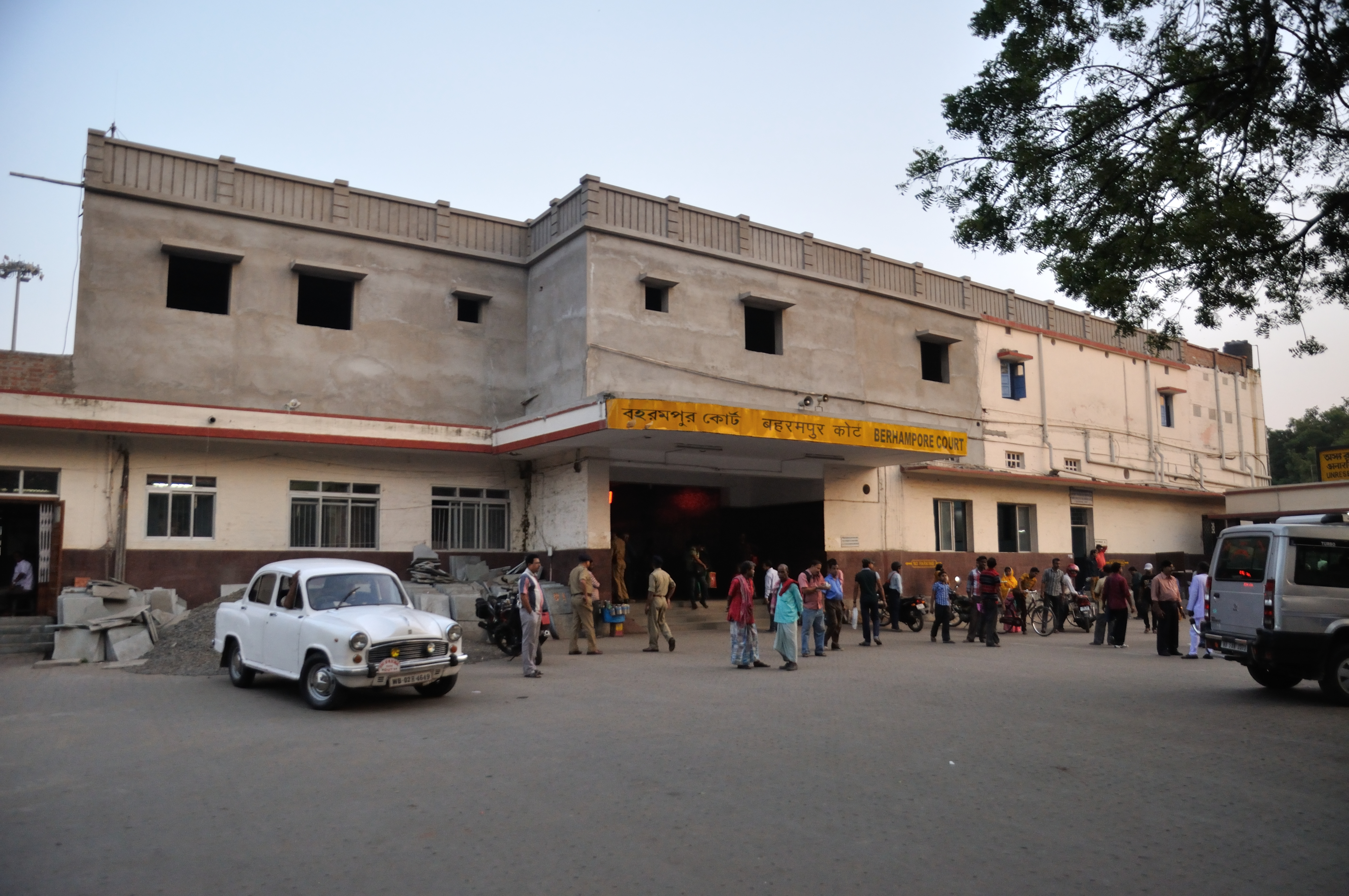
Berhampore Court railway station

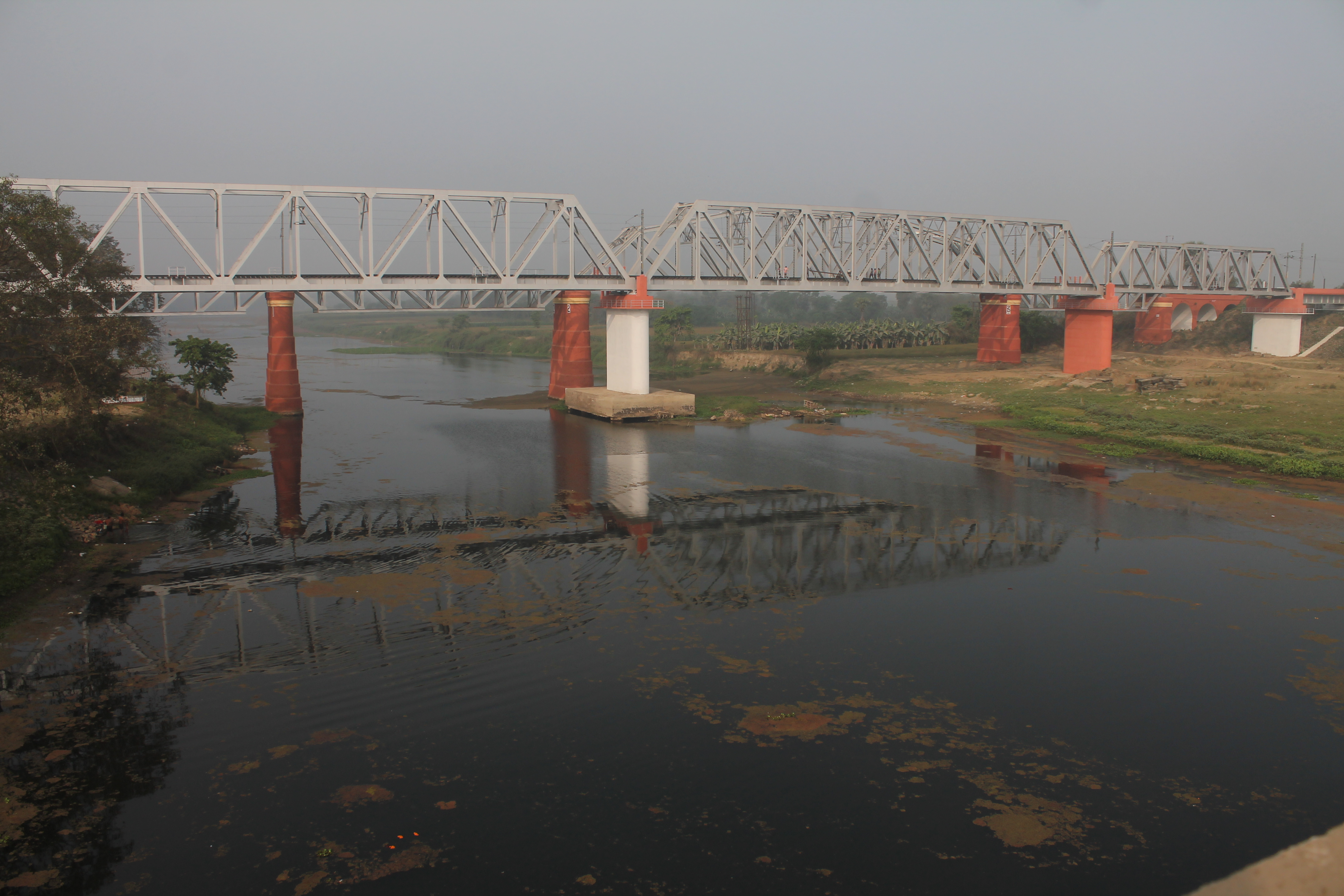
Rail Bridge over Jalangi river at Krishnanagar
