= Murshidabad Junction railway station =

Railway station in West Bengal, India

MURSHIDABAD JUNCTION.
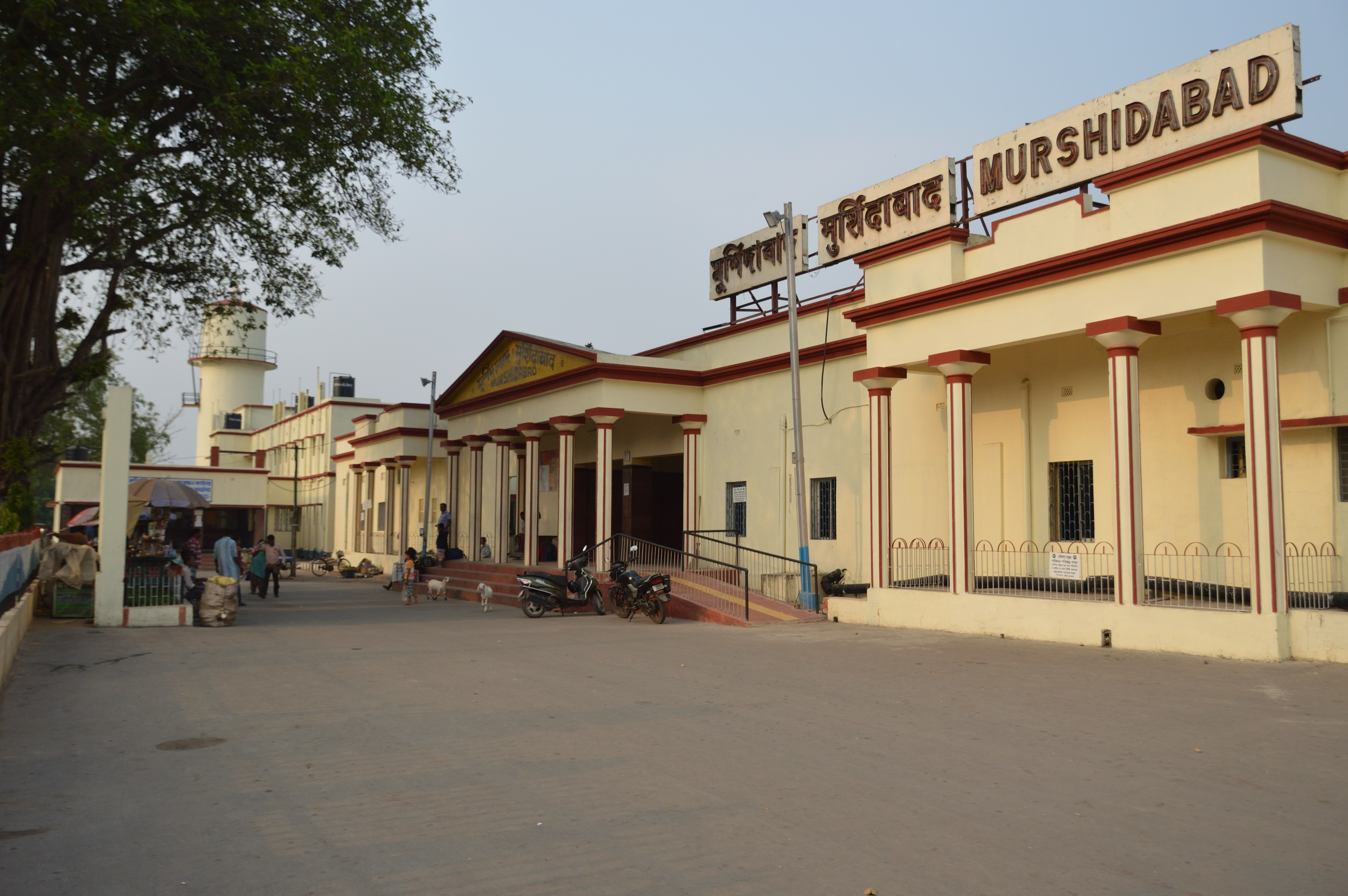
- Entrance

General information
- Location: Lalbagh, Murshidabad district, West Bengal; India
- Coordinates: 24°10′37″N 88°16′54″E
- Elevation: 24 m (79 ft)
- System: Express train and Passenger train station
- Owner: Indian Railways
- Operator: Eastern Railway zone
- Line: Sealdah-Lalgola line Murshidabad- Azimganj link line
- Platforms: 3
- Tracks: 4

Construction
- Structure type: At grade
- Parking: Available
- Accessible: Disabled access

Other information
- Status: Active
- Station code: MBB
- Zone(s): Eastern Railway
- Division(s): Sealdah
- Classification: NSG-4

History
- Former names: East Indian Railway Company

Services
Preceding station	Indian Railways	Following station
Cossimbazar towards Sealdah	Eastern Railway zone Sealdah-Lalgola line	Nashipur Road towards Lalgola
Terminus	Eastern Railway zone Murshidabad- Azimganj link line	Azimganj Junction towards ?
Location
- Interactive map

Murshidabad Junction is a railway station on the Sealdah-Lalgola line and is located at Lalbagh, Murshidabad in Murshidabad district in the Indian state of West Bengal.

== History ==
Ranaghat–Lalgola branch line was opened in 1905 during British reign.

== Electrification ==
The 128 km long Krishnanagar–Lalgola stretch was electrified in 2004 for EMU services.

== Infrastructure ==
The railway station has three platforms after the installation of a double railway track. The No. 1 platform is connected to Azimganj Junction.

== Extension ==
For the shortest route between Siliguri and Kolkata, Railway Ministry of India had attempted to connect Murshidabad with Azimganj Junction. The bridge named as Nashipur Rail Bridge over the Bhagirathi River was built decade ago. But due to land acquisition problems, the work of connecting these two stations couldn't be completed. The work has resumed again in November, 2022. After work completed in February 2024, the Nashipur bridge is now commissioned from March 2024. Rail Ministry reports say that this bridge will minimise the travel distance between Sealdah and Siliguri by 20 kilometres (12 mi) as well as saving 20–25 minutes of travel time. Murshidabad is now officially a Junction Railway Station.

== Current Mail/Express/EMU/MEMU trains ==
- SDAH-LGL Bhagirathi Express Daily Service
- KOAA-LGL Hazarduari Express Daily Service
- SDAH-JPG Sealdah - Jalpaiguri Road Humsafar Express Weekly service
- KOAA-SANG Kolkata–Sairang Express Three days a week
- KOAA-LGL Dhano Dhanye Express Four days a week
- SDAH-LGL Fast Passenger Daily Service
- SDAH-LGL MEMU Passenger Daily Service
- KOAA-LGL MEMU Passenger Daily Service
