= Azimganj Junction railway station =

Railway Station in West Bengal, India

AZIMGANJ JUNCTION

General information
- Location: Azimganj Station Rd, Jiaganj Azimganj, Murshidabad, West Bengal; India
- Coordinates: 24°12′51″N 88°15′10″E
- Elevation: 18 m (59 ft)
- System: Indian Railways junction station
- Owner: Indian Railways
- Operator: Eastern Railway
- Lines: Nalhati–Azimganj branch line, Barharwa–Azimganj–Katwa loop, Howrah-New Jalpaiguri Loop line(via BAK loop), Murshidabad- Azimganj link line
- Platforms: 6
- Tracks: 6
- Connections: Auto stand

Construction
- Structure type: At grade
- Parking: Yes
- Accessible: Disabled access

Other information
- Status: Active
- Station code: AZ
- Zone(s): Eastern Railway
- Division(s): Howrah
- Classification: NSG-5

History
- Opened: 1863
- Former names: East Indian Railway

Services
Preceding station	Indian Railways	Following station
Dahapara Dham towards Katwa Junction	Eastern Railway zone Barharwa–Azimganj–Katwa loop	Azimganj City towards Barharwa Junction
Terminus	Eastern Railway zone Nalhati-Azimganj branch line	Gosaingram towards Nalhati
Dahapara Dham towards Howrah	Eastern Railway zone Howrah-New Jalpaiguri line(via BAK loop)	Azimganj City towards New Jalpaiguri
Murshidabad Junction towards ?	Eastern Railway zone Murshidabad- Azimganj link line	Terminus
Location
- Interactive map

Azimganj Junction is a railway station on the Barharwa–Azimganj–Katwa loop and is located in Azimganj of Murshidabad district lying west of Bhagirathi, a part of the Hooghly river in the Indian state of West Bengal. It is classified as an NSG-5 category station under the jurisdiction of the Howrah Division in Eastern Railway. It serves a small portion of the Jiaganj-Azimganj municipal town, which falls under the administrative jurisdiction of the Lalbag subdivision in Murshidabad district.The nearest railway station is Jiaganj, located on the Sealdah–Lalgola line, situated across the Bhagirathi river within the same municipal town.

== Revenue ==
Revenue Details of Azimganj
Financial Year	Category	Revenue (INR)	Approximate Value
2024–25	Reservation Tickets – PRS	₹27,876,421	Nearly ₹2.79 crore
2024–25	Unreserved Tickets – UTS	₹46,380,730	Nearly ₹4.64 crore
2024–25	Total (PRS + UTS)	₹74,257,151	Nearly ₹7.43 crore
2023–24	Total (PRS + UTS)	₹72,938,810	Nearly ₹7.29 crore

== History ==
In 1863, the Indian Branch Railway Company, a private company opened the Nalhati–Azimganj branch line. The 27 kilometres (17 mi) track was initially a 4 ft (1,219 mm) gauge line. The track was subsequently converted to 5 ft 6 in (1,676 mm) broad gauge. The Indian Branch Railway Company was purchased by the Government of India in 1872 and the line was renamed Nalhati State Railway. It became a part of the East Indian Railway Company in 1892.

In 1913, the Hooghly–Katwa Railway constructed a line from Bandel to Katwa, and the Barharwa–Azimganj–Katwa Railway constructed the Barharwa–Azimganj–Katwa loop line.

With the construction of the Farakka Barrage and opening of the railway bridge in 1971, the railway communication picture of the area completely changed. Azimganj junction emerged as an important station in the links to New Jalpaiguri.

== Major trains ==
Some of the important trains that runs from Azimganj junction are :

- Kamakhya–Howrah Vande Bharat Sleeper Express
- Howrah–Malda Town InterCity Express (via Azimganj)
- Kamakhya–Puri Weekly Express
- Howrah–Azimganj Kavi Guru Express
- Teesta Torsha Express
- Ganadevata Express
- Hate Bazare Express
- Kolkata–Radhikapur Express
- Paharia Express
- Katihar–Howrah Weekly Express
- Teesta–Torsa Link Express
- Nabadwip Dham–Malda Town Express
- Kamrup Express
- Howrah–Balurghat Express
- Kolkata–Guwahati Garib Rath Express
- Sealdah - Jalpaiguri Road Humsafar Express
- Kolkata–Sairang Express

== See also ==
- Khagraghat Road railway station
- Berhampore Court railway station
- Jangipur Road railway station
- Nalhati Junction railway station
