= Nashipur Road railway station =

Railway station in West Bengal, India

NASHIPUR ROAD

General information
- Location: Nashipur, Murshidabad district, West Bengal; India
- Coordinates: 24.215567°N 88.274508°E
- Elevation: 20 m (66 ft)
- Owner: Indian Railways
- Operator: Eastern Railway zone
- Line: Sealdah-Lalgola line
- Platforms: 0
- Tracks: 0

Construction
- Structure type: Standard (on ground station)
- Parking: No

Other information
- Status: Inoperative
- Station code: NSO
- Zone(s): Eastern Railway zone
- Division(s): Sealdah

History
- Electrified: N/A
- Former names: East Indian Railway Company

Services
Preceding station	Kolkata Suburban Railway	Following station
Murshidabad towards Krishnanagar City Junction	Eastern Line Krishnanagar–Lalgola line	Jiaganj towards Lalgola
Route map
Location
- Location within West Bengal Location within India

Nashipur Road was a railway station of the Sealdah-Lalgola line in the Eastern Railway zone of Indian Railways. The station was situated at Nashipur in Murshidabad district in the Indian state of West Bengal. It served Nashipur and surroundings areas. Lalgola Passengers and few EMU trains used to pass through the station. Presently the station is non functional, after Nashipur bridge completion, this station may be functional again.

== Electrification ==
The Krishnanagar–Lalgola section, including Nashipur Road railway station was electrified in 2007. In 2010 the line became double tracked.
