= Siraj Nagar Halt railway station =

Railway station in West Bengal, India

Siraj Nagar Halt
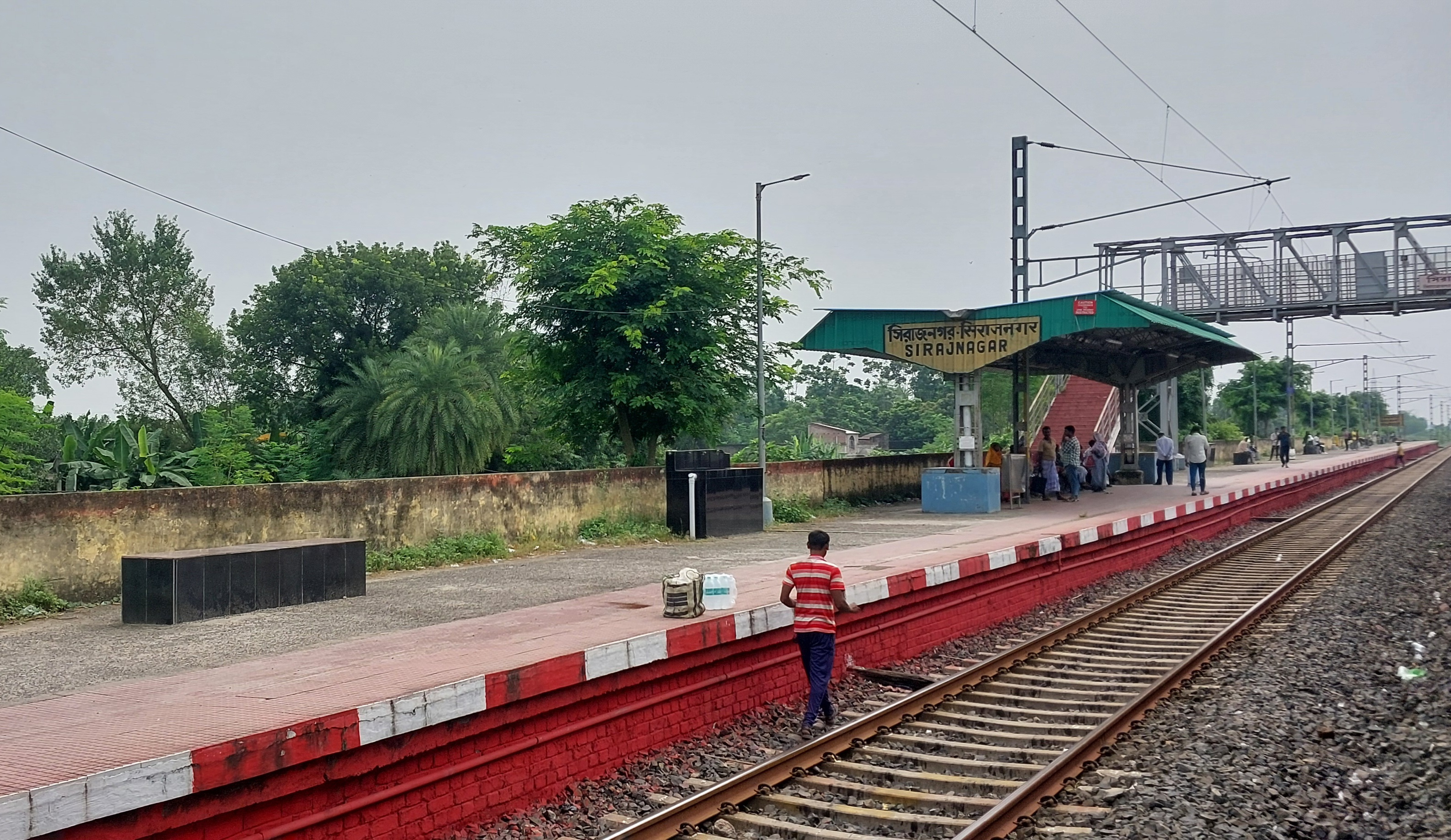
- Sirajnagar Halt railway station

General information
- Location: Sirajnagar, Andulberia, Murshidabad district, West Bengal; India
- Coordinates: 23.821732°N 88.269628°E
- Elevation: 19 m (62 ft)
- System: Passenger train and Suburban train station
- Owner: Indian Railways
- Operator: Eastern Railway zone
- Line: Sealdah-Lalgola line
- Platforms: 2
- Tracks: 2

Construction
- Structure type: Standard (on ground station)
- Parking: No

Other information
- Status: Active
- Station code: SRJN
- Zone(s): Eastern Railway zone
- Division(s): Sealdah

History
- Former names: East Indian Railway Company

Services
Preceding station	Kolkata Suburban Railway	Following station
Plassey towards Krishnanagar City Junction	Eastern Line Krishnanagar–Lalgola line	Rejinagar towards Lalgola
Route map
Location
- Location within West Bengal Location within India

Sirajnagar Halt railway station is a halt railway station of the Sealdah-Lalgola line in the Eastern Railway zone of Indian Railways. The station is situated at Sirajnagar, under Rejinagar police station in Murshidabad district in the Indian state of West Bengal. It serves Sirajnagar, Andulberia and nearby villages. Lalgola Passengers and EMU pass through the station.

== Electrification ==
The Krishnanagar–Lalgola section, including Rejinagar railway station was electrified in 2004. In 2010 the line became double tracked.
