= Jiaganj railway station =

Railway station in West Bengal, India

JIAGANJ
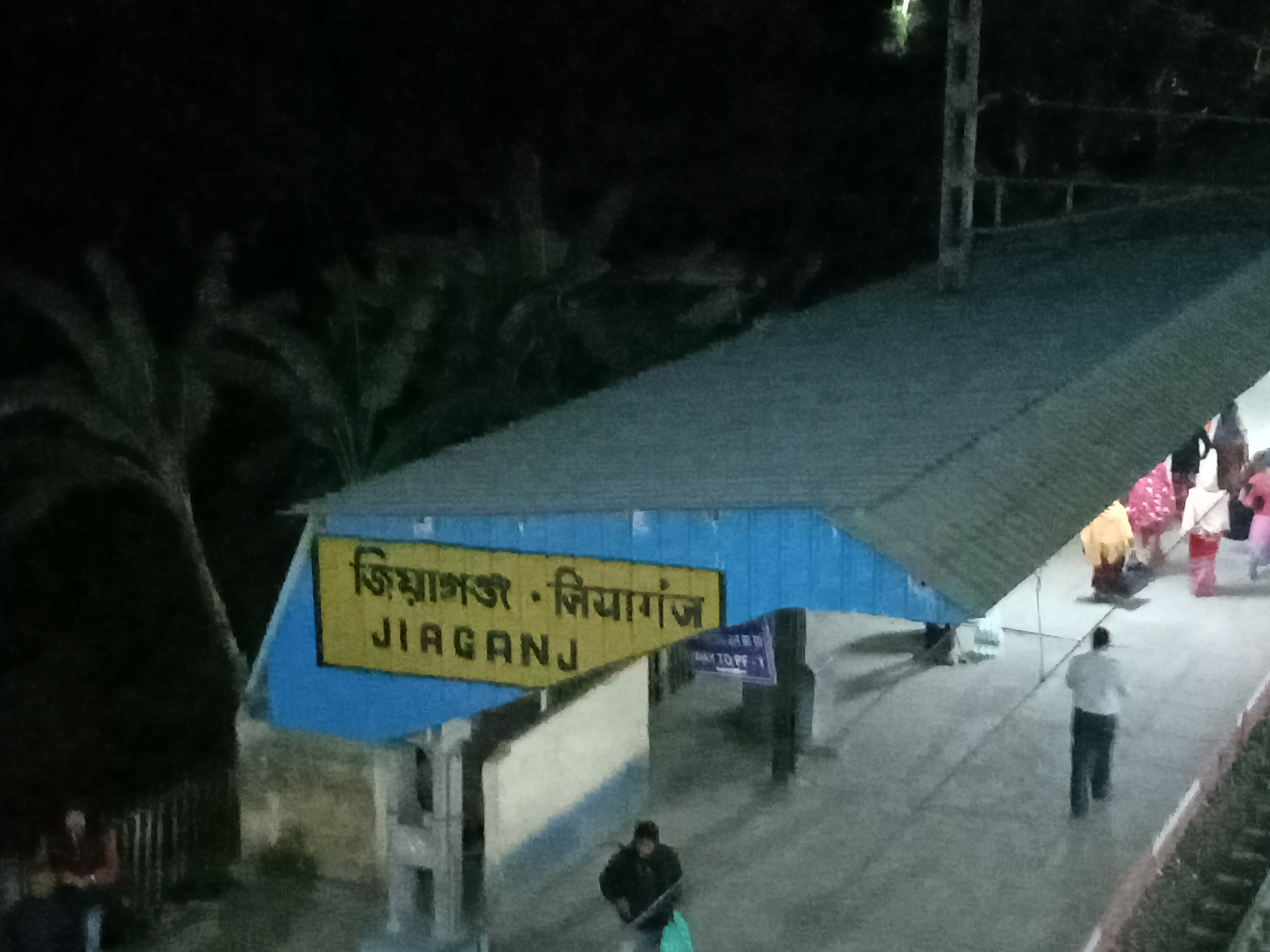

General information
- Location: Station Road, Jiaganj, Murshidabad district, West Bengal; India
- Coordinates: 24.244039°N 88.276875°E
- Elevation: 23 m (75 ft)
- System: Express train, Passenger train and Suburban train station
- Owner: Indian Railways
- Operator: Eastern Railway zone
- Line: Sealdah-Lalgola line
- Platforms: 2
- Tracks: 2

Construction
- Structure type: Standard (on ground station)
- Parking: No

Other information
- Status: Active
- Station code: JJG
- Zone(s): Eastern Railway zone
- Division(s): Sealdah

History
- Former names: East Indian Railway Company

Services
Preceding station	Kolkata Suburban Railway	Following station
Nashipur Road towards Krishnanagar City Junction	Eastern Line Krishnanagar–Lalgola line	Subarnamrigi towards Lalgola
Route map
Location
- Location within West Bengal Location within India

Jiaganj is a railway station of the Sealdah-Lalgola line in the Eastern Railway zone of Indian Railways. The station is situated at Jiaganj in Murshidabad district in the Indian state of West Bengal. It serves Jiaganj town and surroundings areas. Distance between Sealdah and Jiaganj is 204 km. Bhagirathi Express, Hazarduari Express, Dhano Dhanye Express, Lalgola Passengers and few EMU trains pass through the station.

== Electrification ==
The Krishnanagar–Lalgola Section, including Jiaganj railway station was electrified in 2004. In 2010 the line became double tracked.
