= Pagla Chandi railway station =

Railway station in West Bengal, India

Pagla Chandi
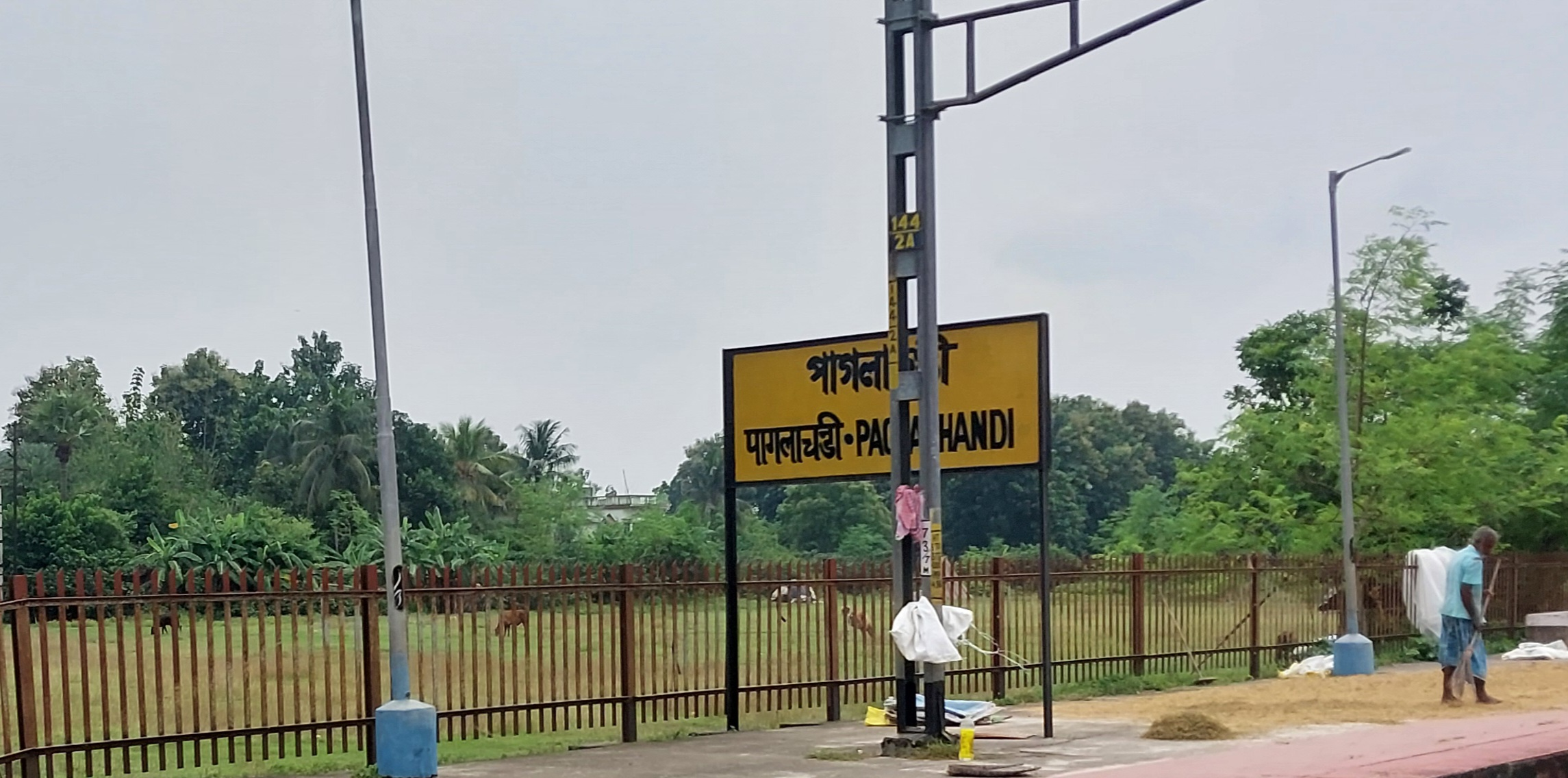

General information
- Location: Gobindapur, Nadia, West Bengal; India
- Coordinates: 23.733025°N 88.305256°E
- Elevation: 18 m (59 ft)
- System: Kolkata Suburban Railway station
- Owner: Indian Railways
- Operator: Eastern Railway
- Line: Krishnanagar–Lalgola line
- Platforms: 2
- Tracks: 2

Construction
- Structure type: At grade
- Parking: Not available
- Cycle facilities: Not available
- Accessible: Not available

Other information
- Status: Functional
- Station code: PCX
- Zone(s): Eastern Railway
- Division(s): Sealdah

History
- Opened: 1890
- Electrified: 2010

Services
Preceding station	Kolkata Suburban Railway	Following station
Debagram towards Krishnanagar City Junction	Eastern Line Krishnanagar–Lalgola line	Plassey towards Lalgola
Route map
Location
- Location within West Bengal Location within India

Pagla Chandi railway station is a railway station under the Sealdah railway division of the Eastern Railway zone of India. It serves Gobindapur and nearby villages and is situated besides the National Highway 34 at Gobindapur on the Lalgola to Krishnanagar line in Nadia in the Indian state of West Bengal. The station was named after Pagla Chandi, a flow less river of West Bengal. The distance between Sealdah and Pagla Chandi is 144 km. Few EMU and Lalgola passenger trains are passing through Pagla Chandi railway station.
