= New Balarampur Halt railway station =

Railway station in West Bengal, India

NEW BALARAMPUR HALT
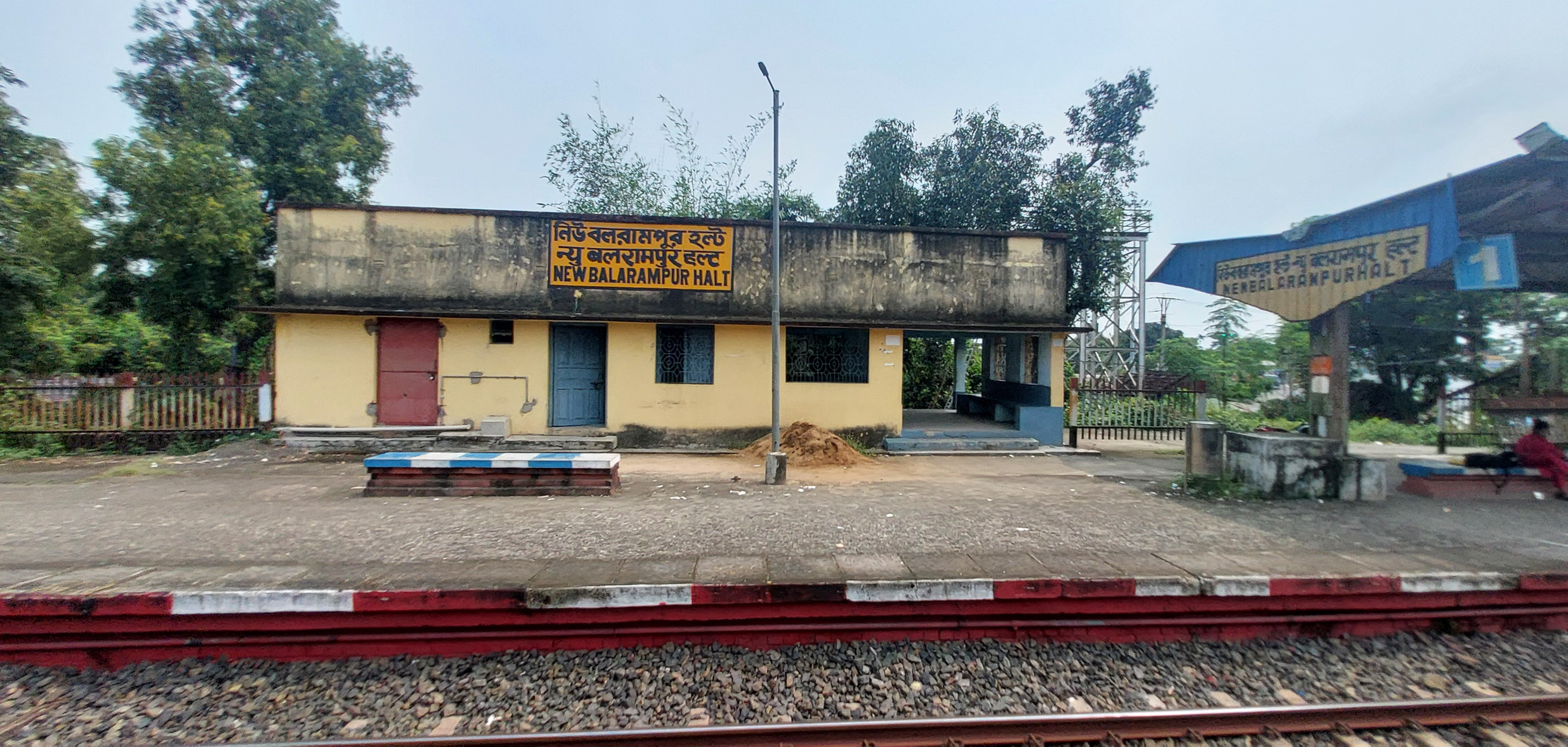
- New Balarampur Halt railway station

General information
- Location: Balarampur, Murshidabad district, West Bengal; India
- Coordinates: 24.049098°N 88.246969°E
- Elevation: 22 m (72 ft)
- System: Passenger train and Suburban train station
- Owner: Indian Railways
- Operator: Eastern Railway zone
- Line: Sealdah-Lalgola line
- Platforms: 2
- Tracks: 2

Construction
- Structure type: Standard (on ground station)
- Parking: No

Other information
- Status: Active
- Station code: NBPH
- Zone(s): Eastern Railway zone
- Division(s): Sealdah

History
- Former names: East Indian Railway Company

Services
Preceding station	Kolkata Suburban Railway	Following station
Sargachi towards Krishnanagar City Junction	Eastern Line Krishnanagar–Lalgola line	Berhampore Court towards Lalgola
Route map
Location
- Location within West Bengal Location within India

New Balarampur Halt railway station is a railway station of the Sealdah-Lalgola line in the Eastern Railway zone of Indian Railways. The station is situated beside National Highway 12 at Balarampur village in Murshidabad district in the Indian state of West Bengal. It serves Balarampur and surroundings village areas. Total six trains including Lalgola Passengers and few EMU trains stop there.

== Electrification ==
The Krishnanagar–Lalgola section, including New Balarampur Halt railway station was electrified in 2004. In 2010 the line became double tracked.
