= Subarnamrigi railway station =

Railway station in West Bengal, India

Subarnamrigi

General information
- Location: Station Road, Digha, Subarnamrigi, Murshidabad district, West Bengal; India
- Coordinates: 24.283798°N 88.293816°E
- Elevation: 22 m (72 ft)
- System: Passenger train and Suburban train station
- Owner: Indian Railways
- Operator: Eastern Railway zone
- Line: Sealdah–Lalgola main line
- Platforms: 2
- Tracks: 2

Construction
- Structure type: Standard (on ground station)
- Parking: No

Other information
- Status: Active
- Station code: SBNM
- Zone(s): Eastern Railway zone
- Division(s): Sealdah

History
- Former names: East Indian Railway Company

Services
Preceding station	Kolkata Suburban Railway	Following station
Jiaganj towards Krishnanagar City Junction	Eastern Line Krishnanagar–Lalgola line	Bhagwangola towards Lalgola
Route map
Location
- Location within West Bengal Location within India

Subarnamrigi is a railway station of the Lalgola Ranaghat Sealdah branch lines in the Eastern Railway zone of Indian Railways. The station is situated at Digha, Subarnamrigi in Murshidabad district in the Indian state of West Bengal. It serves Subarnamrigi village, Bhagawangola I block and surroundings areas. Lalgola Passengers and few EMU trains pass through the station.

== Electrification ==
The Krishnanagar–Lalgola section, including Subarnamrigi railway station was electrified in 2004. In 2010 the line became double tracked.
