= Sargachi railway station =

Railway station in West Bengal, India

SARAGACHHI
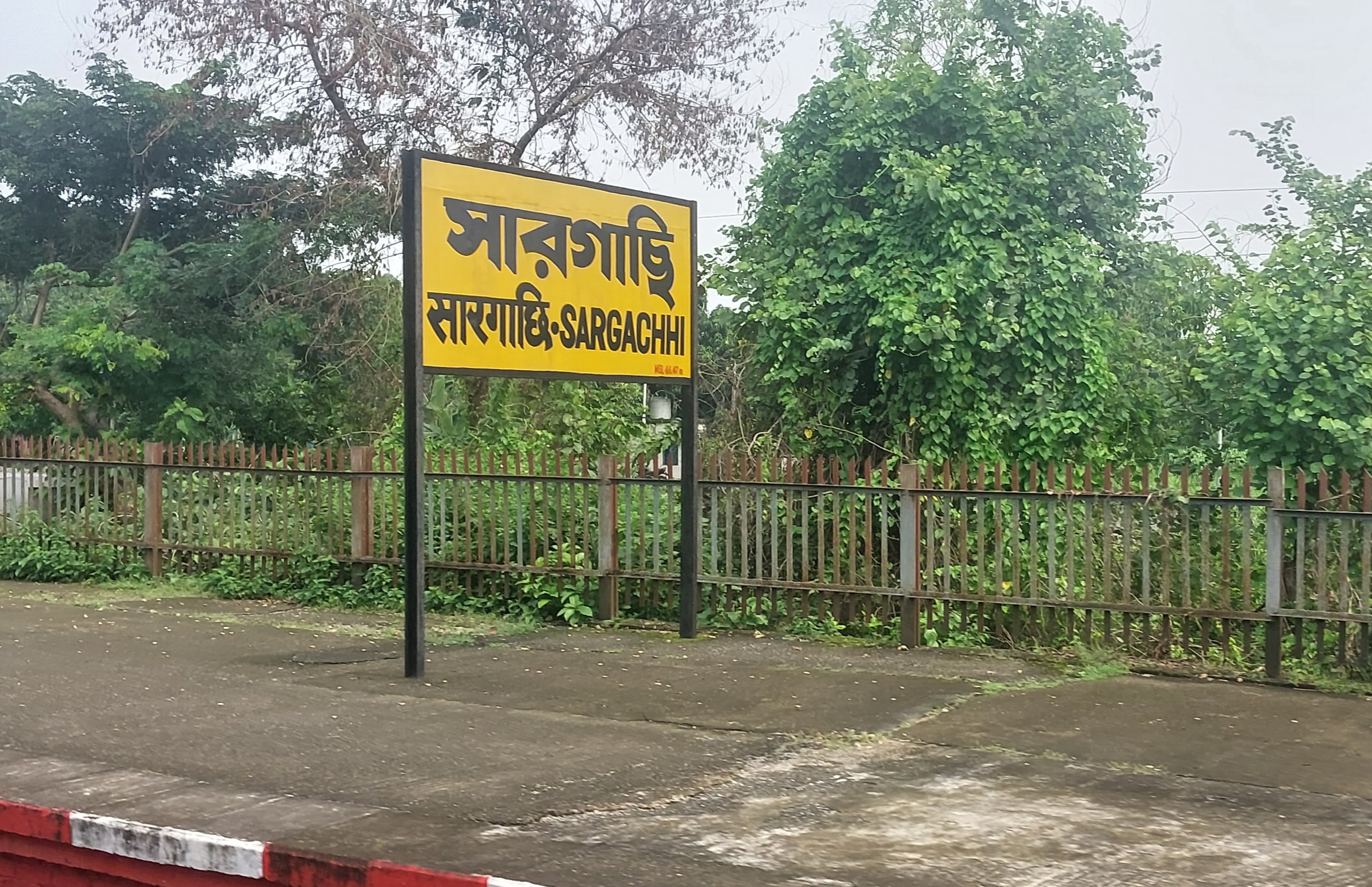

General information
- Location: Sargachi, Murshidabad district, West Bengal; India
- Coordinates: 24.017921°N 88.244325°E
- Elevation: 23 m (75 ft)
- System: Passenger train and Suburban train station
- Owner: Indian Railways
- Operator: Eastern Railway zone
- Line: Sealdah-Lalgola line
- Platforms: 3
- Tracks: 3

Construction
- Structure type: Standard (on ground station)
- Parking: No

Other information
- Status: Active
- Station code: SGV
- Zone(s): Eastern Railway zone
- Division(s): Sealdah

History
- Former names: East Indian Railway Company

Services
Preceding station	Kolkata Suburban Railway	Following station
Bhabta towards Krishnanagar City Junction	Eastern Line Krishnanagar–Lalgola line	New Balarampur Halt towards Lalgola
Route map
Location
- Location within West Bengal Location within India

Saragachhi railway station is a railway station of the Sealdah-Lalgola line in the Eastern Railway zone of Indian Railways. The station is situated beside National Highway 34 at Sargachi village in Murshidabad district in the Indian state of West Bengal. It serves Sargachi and surroundings village areas. Total 12 trains including Lalogola Passengers and few EMUs stop in this station. The distance between Sargachi and Sealdah is 206 km (128 mi).

== Electrification ==
The Krishnanagar–Lalgola Section, including Sargachi railway station was electrified in 2004. In 2010 the line became double tracked.
