= Berhampore Court railway station =

Railway Station in West Bengal, India

Berhampore Court
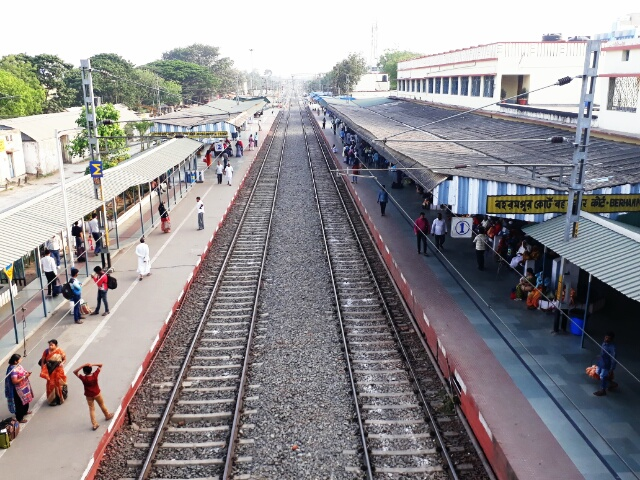

General information
- Location: India
- Coordinates: 24°05′21″N 88°15′50″E
- Elevation: 22 m (72 ft)
- System: Indian Railways and Kolkata Suburban Railway
- Owner: Indian Railways
- Operator: Eastern Railway
- Line: Sealdah-Lalgola line
- Platforms: 5
- Tracks: 5

Construction
- Structure type: At grade
- Parking: Available
- Accessible: Yes

Other information
- Status: Active
- Station code: BPC
- Zone(s): Eastern Railway
- Division(s): Sealdah
- Classification: NSG-3

History
- Electrified: Yes (December, 2007)
- Former names: East Indian Railway Company

Passengers
- 15k/day (▲ medium)

Services
Preceding station	Kolkata Suburban Railway	Following station
New Balarampur Halt towards Krishnanagar City Junction	Eastern Line Krishnanagar–Lalgola line	Cossimbazar towards Lalgola

Other services
Location
- Interactive map

Berhampore Court is a railway station on the Sealdah-Lalgola line and is located in Murshidabad district in the Indian state of West Bengal. It serves Berhampore city and its surrounding census areas.

== History ==
The Calcutta (Sealdah)–Kusthia line of Eastern Bengal Railway was opened to traffic in 1862. The Ranaghat–Lalgola branch line was established in 1905 as an extension of Sealdah–Ranaghat line. This railway station was named Berhampore Court in accordance with the British pronunciation of Baharampore as "Berhampore". The rail distance between Berhampore and Sealdah is approximately 186 km (116 mi).

== Expansion and electrification ==
Krishnanagar to Lalgola electrification and line doubling were completed in March 2017.

== Important trains ==
- Bhagirathi Express
- Hazarduari Express
- Dhano Dhanye Express
- Sealdah - Jalpaiguri Road Humsafar Express
- Kolkata–Sairang Express
