= Pirtala railway station =

Indian railway station

Pirtala

General information
- Location: Pirtala, Murshidabad district, West Bengal; India
- Coordinates: 24.3596°N 88.2811°E
- Elevation: 24 m (79 ft)
- System: Passenger train and Suburban train station
- Owner: Indian Railways
- Operator: Eastern Railway zone
- Line: Sealdah–Lalgola main line
- Platforms: 2
- Tracks: 2

Construction
- Structure type: Standard (on ground station)
- Parking: No

Other information
- Status: Active
- Station code: PRTL
- Zone(s): Eastern Railway zone
- Division(s): Sealdah

History
- Former names: East Indian Railway Company

Services
Preceding station	Kolkata Suburban Railway	Following station
Bhagwangola towards Krishnanagar City Junction	Eastern Line Krishnanagar–Lalgola line	Krishnapur towards Lalgola
Route map
Location
- Location within West Bengal Location within India

Pirtala is a railway station of the Lalgola-Sealdah branch lines in the Eastern Railway zone of Indian Railways. The station is situated at Pirtala in Murshidabad district in the Indian state of West Bengal. The railway station serves Pirtala village and the surrounding area. A total of 11 trains including Lalgola Passengers and few EMU trains stop at this station.

== Electrification ==
The Krishnanagar–Lalgola Section, including the Pirtala railway station, was electrified in 2004. The section was turned into a double-tracked line when a new track was added alongside the previous one in 2010.
