= Bahadurpur railway station =

Railway station in West Bengal, India

Bahadurpur
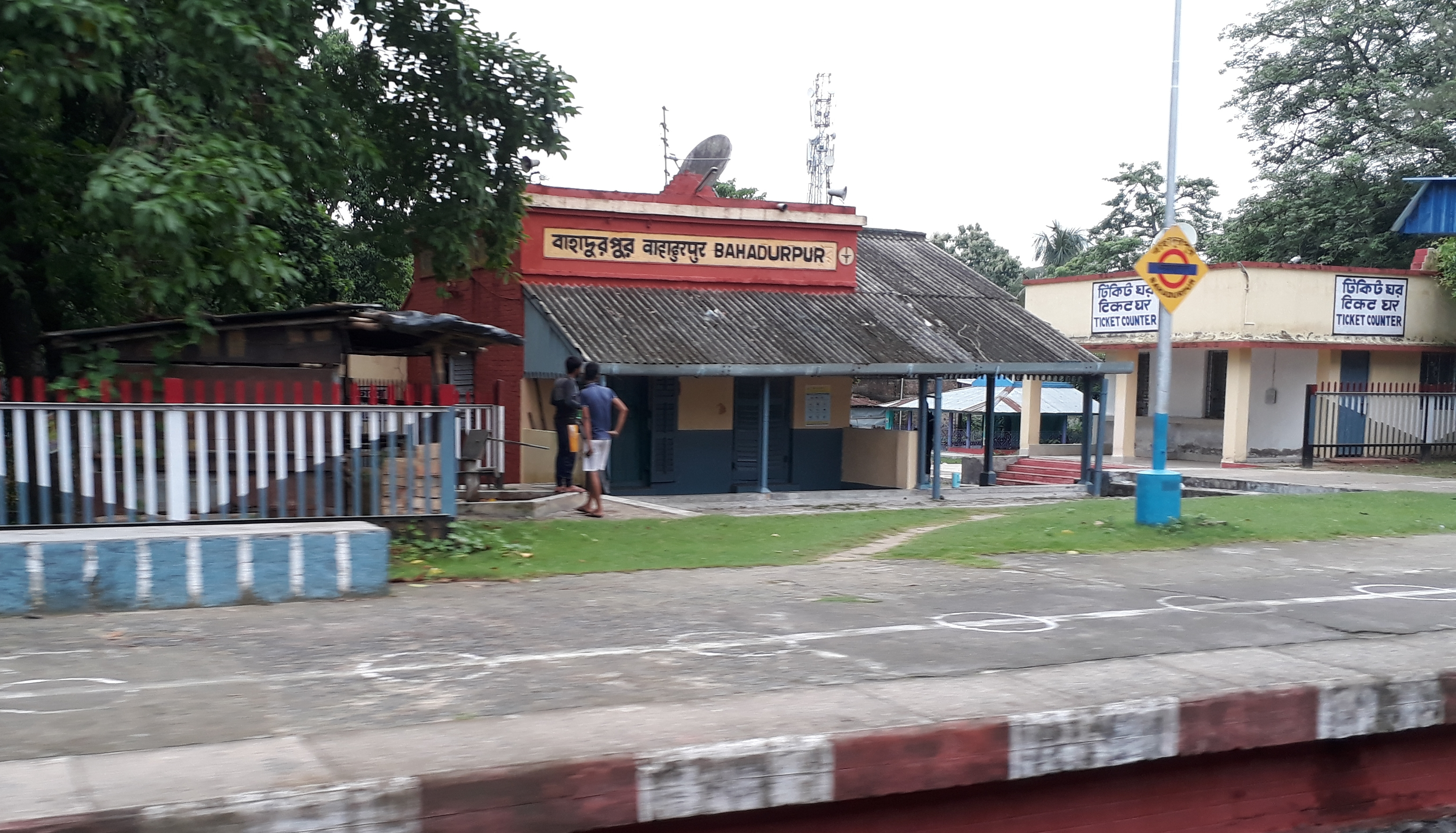

General information
- Location: N.H 34, Bahadurpur, Nadia district, West Bengal; India
- Coordinates: 23.439056°N 88.463997°E
- System: Kolkata Suburban Railway
- Owner: Indian Railways
- Operator: Eastern Railway
- Line: Krishnanagar–Lalgola line
- Platforms: 2
- Tracks: 2

Construction
- Structure type: At grade
- Parking: Not available
- Cycle facilities: Not available
- Accessible: Not available

Other information
- Status: Functional
- Station code: BPD
- Zone(s): Eastern Railway
- Division(s): Sealdah

History
- Opened: 1905
- Electrified: 2007

Services
Preceding station	Kolkata Suburban Railway	Following station
Krishnanagar City Junction towards Sealdah	Eastern Line Krishnanagar–Lalgola line	Dhubulia towards Lalgola
Route map
Location
- Location within West Bengal Location within India

Bahadurpur railway station is a railway station under Sealdah railway division of Eastern Railway system. It is situated beside National Highway 34 in Bahadurpur on the Krishnanagar–Lalgola line in Nadia in the Indian state of West Bengal. Few EMU and Lalgola passengers trains stop in Bahadurpur railway station.

== Electrification ==
The 128 km-long Krishnanagar–Lalgola stretch including Bahadurpur railway station was electrified in 2007 for EMU service.
