= Nashipur Rail Bridge =

- Coordinates: 24.2144°N 88.2640°E
- Crosses: Bhagirathi River
- Locale: Murshidabad, West Bengal, India
- Official name: Bridge No. 8

Characteristics
- Total length: 313 metres (1,027 ft)

Rail characteristics
- Electrified: 19 February 2024

History
- Construction start: 2006
- Construction end: 2024
- Inaugurated: 2 March 2024

Location
- Interactive map of Nashipur Rail Bridge

Nashipur Rail Bridge or Nashipur – Azimganj Rail Bridge (officially Bridge No.8) connects Murshidabad Junction railway station and Azimganj Junction across the river Bhagirathi of district Murshidabad in the Indian state of West Bengal. This 313 metres (1,027 ft) long rail bridge is operational from March 2024.

== History ==
The bridge used to exist during British regime and was later disbanded during World War II. Azimganj - Nalhati Railway line started in the year 1872. The bridge used to act as a NG branch line from Azimganj to Behrampore connecting Lalgola-Krishnnagar BG line with Azimganj Nalhati BG line.

This rail bridge on the Bhagirathi river reduces travel time between South Bengal and North Bengal. As per railway officials the bridge shortens the distance between Sealdah and New Jalpaiguri by about 21 km. The new bridge is 313 metres (1,027 ft) long. Due to difficulties of land acquisition, this project was halted for 13 years since 2010. After 13 years, the dispute of the land of 476 metre has been escalated. The construction began again on 30 November 2022. Railway board promised to complete the leftover work by August 2023. On 29 July, the GM of Eastern Railway affirmed that this line would be commissioned by the end of 2023. This new line was electrified on 19 February 2024. Officials of Commissioner of Railway Safety visited the site on 29 February 2024 and trial runs were conducted. CRS gave satisfactory remarks afterwards. Azimganj Murshidabad new line was inaugurated on 2 March 2024 by Prime Minister Narendra Modi.

== Land acquisition problem ==
More the 90% of the work has been completed but due to land acquisition problem the work is stopped.

Due to the ongoing land acquisition problem for this track the Rs. 70 crore for this project of Indian Railways stands abandoned. The plots that need to be acquired are located between Azimganj railway junction and the right bank of the Bhagirathi in Mahinagar area of Murshidabad - Jiaganj block.

Rail Roko agitations has been organised since 1994 by Murshidabad District Railway Passengers Association over this long standing demand.

As per "Anandabazar patrika" dated 9 October 2015, land Acquisition problem has been resolved & land has been submitted to the railway division to start work for approach line

As per 24 Ghanta news dated 16 March 2017 the work is going on with schedule speed & lying of track & electrification will be completed by year end.

According to "Ei Samay" and "Anandabazar Patrika", work has begun on the west approach to the bridge on 30 November 2022.

Eastern Railways planned to introduce some trains in this route. A proposal was sent to railway board for the diversion of Darjeeling mail to this route, which was rejected. Eventually four pairs of passenger trains were introduced on this route, three pairs between Azimganj and Cossimbazar and one pair between Azimganj and Krishnanagar City Junction. A weekly long distance train, the Sealdah - Jalpaiguri Road Humsafar Express was also introduced.

== See also ==
Jiaganj Azimganj
