= Kolkata–Sairang Express =

Train in India

Kolkata - Sairang Express

Overview
- Service type: Express
- Locale: West Bengal, Bihar, Assam and Mizoram
- First service: 13 September 2025; 14 months ago (Inaugural) 16 September 2025; 13 months ago (Commercial)
- Current operator: Eastern Railway (ER)

Route
- Termini: Kolkata (KOAA); Sairang (SANG)
- Stops: 26
- Distance travelled: 1,485 km (923 mi)
- Average journey time: 31 hrs 20 mins
- Service frequency: Tri- Weekly
- Train number: 13125 / 13126

On-board services
- Class: General Unreserved (GS) Sleeper Class (SL) AC 3 Tier Class AC 2 Tier Class
- Seating arrangements: Yes
- Sleeping arrangements: Yes
- Catering facilities: No
- Observation facilities: Large windows
- Baggage facilities: No
- Other facilities: Below the seats

Technical
- Rolling stock: LHB coach
- Track gauge: 1,676 mm (5 ft 6 in)
- Electrification: No electric line from Tufanganj to Sairang 25 kV 50 Hz AC overhead line
- Operating speed: 120 km/h (75 mph) maximum, 47 km/h (29 mph) average including halts.
- Track owner: Indian Railways

The 13125 / 13126 Kolkata–Sairang Express is an express train belonging to Eastern Railway zone that runs between the capital city Kolkata of West Bengal and Sairang, the city in Aizawl District of Mizoram in India.

It inaugurated on 13 September 2025 via conference by Prime Minister Narendra Modi via video conference.

== Service ==
● 13125 Kolkata–Sairang Express has an average speed of 47.40 km/h and covers 1,485 km (923 mi) in 31 hrs 20 mins.

● 13126 Sairang–Kolkata Express has an average speed of 47.52 km/h and covers 1,485 km (923 mi) in 31 hrs 15 mins.

== Routes and halts ==
The important halts of the train are:

Kolkata – Sairang Express (13125/13126)
Kolkata → Sairang (13125)					Sairang → Kolkata (13126)				
Sr.	Station	Day	Arrival	Departure	Sr.	Station	Day	Arrival	Departure
1	Kolkata	1	–	12:25	1	Sairang	1	–	07:15
2	Naihati Junction	1	13:00	13:02	2	Bairabi	1	08:03	08:05
3	Krishnanagar City Junction	1	14:28	14:30	3	Hailakandi	1	09:13	09:15
4	Berhampore Court	1	15:28	15:30	4	Badarpur Junction (Loco Reversal)	1	10:25	10:35
5	Murshidabad	1	15:40	15:42	5	New Haflong	1	13:10	13:15
6	Azimganj Junction	1	15:55	16:00	6	Hojai	1	16:35	16:37
7	Jangipur Road	1	16:41	16:43	7	Guwahati	1	19:10	19:20
8	New Farakka Junction	1	17:40	17:42	8	Kamakhya	1	19:35	19:40
9	Malda Town	1	18:25	18:35	9	Goalpara	1	21:25	21:27
10	Kishanganj	1	20:28	20:30	10	Abhayapuri	1	22:05	22:07
11	New Jalpaiguri	1	21:40	21:50	11	Bilasipara	1	22:45	22:47
12	New Cooch Behar	2	00:10	00:20	12	Gauripur	1	23:45	23:47
13	Tufanganj	2	00:43	00:45	13	Golokganj	2	00:08	00:10
14	Golokganj	2	01:15	01:17	14	Tufanganj	2	00:35	00:37
15	Gauripur	2	01:50	01:52	15	New Cooch Behar	2	01:30	01:40
16	Bilasipara	2	02:25	02:27	16	New Jalpaiguri	2	03:50	04:00
17	Abhayapuri	2	03:20	03:22	17	Kishanganj	2	05:06	05:08
18	Goalpara	2	03:55	03:57	18	Malda Town	2	08:05	08:15
19	Kamakhya	2	05:50	05:55	19	New Farakka Junction	2	08:47	08:49
20	Guwahati	2	06:30	06:40	20	Jangipur Road	2	09:25	09:27
21	Hojai	2	08:35	08:37	21	Azimganj Junction	2	10:18	10:23
22	New Haflong	2	12:30	12:35	22	Murshidabad	2	10:33	10:35
23	Badarpur Junction (Loco Reversal)	2	15:35	15:45	23	Berhampore Court	2	10:53	10:55
24	Hailakandi	2	16:50	16:52	24	Krishnanagar City Junction	2	12:08	12:10
25	Bairabi	2	18:18	18:20	25	Naihati Junction	2	13:25	13:27
26	Sairang	2	19:45	–	26	Kolkata	2	14:30	–

== Schedule ==
Train schedule: Kolkata ↔ Sairang Express
Train no.	Station code	Departure station	Departure time	Departure day	Arrival station	Arrival time
13125	KOAA	Kolkata	12:25 PM	Sairang	19:45 PM	31h 20m
13126	SANG	Sairang	7:15 AM	Kolkata	2:30 PM	31h 15m

== Coach composition ==
Train Coach: Kolkata ↔ Sairang Express
Sl. No	General Unreserved	Sleeper Class	AC 3rd Class Economy	AC 3rd Class	AC 2nd Class	Engine
1.	4	7	2	5	2	1

== Traction ==
it runs end to end by WAP 7 electric locomotives OF Sealdah/Howrah shed from Kolkata to Sairang.

== Rake reversal ==
The train will reverse 1 time :

1. Badarpur Junction

== Accidents ==
The incident occurred at around 6:54 am on Wednesday, November 11, when the Kolkata-Sairang Express (Train No. 13125), travelling from Kolkata towards Sairang in Mizoram, derailed near Digaru railway station in Assam's Kamrup Metropolitan district. The locomotive and five coaches of the train went off the tracks while it was being received at Digaru station to give precedence to another train.

== See also ==
Some important trains from Kolkata :

1. Kolkata–Haldibari Intercity Express
2. Kolkata - Dibrugarh Superfast Express
3. Kolkata–Silghat Town Kaziranga Express
4. Kolkata–Agra Cantonment Superfast Express
5. Kolkata–Patna Garib Rath Express
6. Kolkata–Guwahati Garib Rath Express
7. Kolkata–Agartala Garib Rath Express
8. Kolkata–Ghazipur City Weekly Express

Trains from Sairang :

1. Kolkata–Sairang Express
2. Sairang–Anand Vihar Terminal Rajdhani Express
3. Guwahati–Sairang Express

Trains using same route:

1. Sealdah - Jalpaiguri Road Humsafar Express

== Notes ==
a. Runs 3 times in a week for every direction.
