= Azimganj City railway station =

Railway station in West Bengal, India

General information
- Location: Police Station Road, Azimganj, Murshidabad district, West Bengal; India
- Coordinates: 24°08′32″N 88°09′21″E
- Elevation: 25 m (82 ft)
- System: Express train, Passenger train station
- Owner: Indian Railways
- Operator: Eastern Railway zone
- Line: Barharwa–Azimganj–Katwa loop Line
- Platforms: 2
- Tracks: 2

Construction
- Structure type: At grade

Other information
- Status: Active
- Station code: ACLE
- Zone(s): Eastern Railway
- Division(s): Howrah

History
- Former names: East Indian Railway Company

Services
Preceding station	Indian Railways	Following station
Azimganj Junction towards Katwa Junction	Eastern Railway zone Barharwa–Azimganj–Katwa loop	Poradanga Halt towards Barharwa Junction
Location

Azimganj City railway station is a railway station on the Howrah–Azimganj line of Howrah railway division of Eastern Railway zone. It is situated beside Police Station Road, Azimganj town of Murshidabad district in the Indian state of West Bengal. It serves the Jiaganj–Azimganj area.

== History ==
In 1913, the Hooghly–Katwa Railway constructed a 1,676 mm (5 ft 6 in)-wide 5 ft 6 in (1,676 mm) broad gauge line from Bandel to Katwa, and the Barharwa–Azimganj–Katwa Railway constructed the 1,676 mm (5 ft 6 in)-wide 5 ft 6 in (1,676 mm) broad gauge Barharwa–Azimganj–Katwa loop. With the construction of the Farakka Barrage and opening of the railway bridge in 1971, the railway communication picture of this line were completely changed. Total 32 trains including few express and passengers stop at Azimganj City railway station.
