= Krishnapur railway station =

Railway station in West Bengal, India

KRISHNAPUR
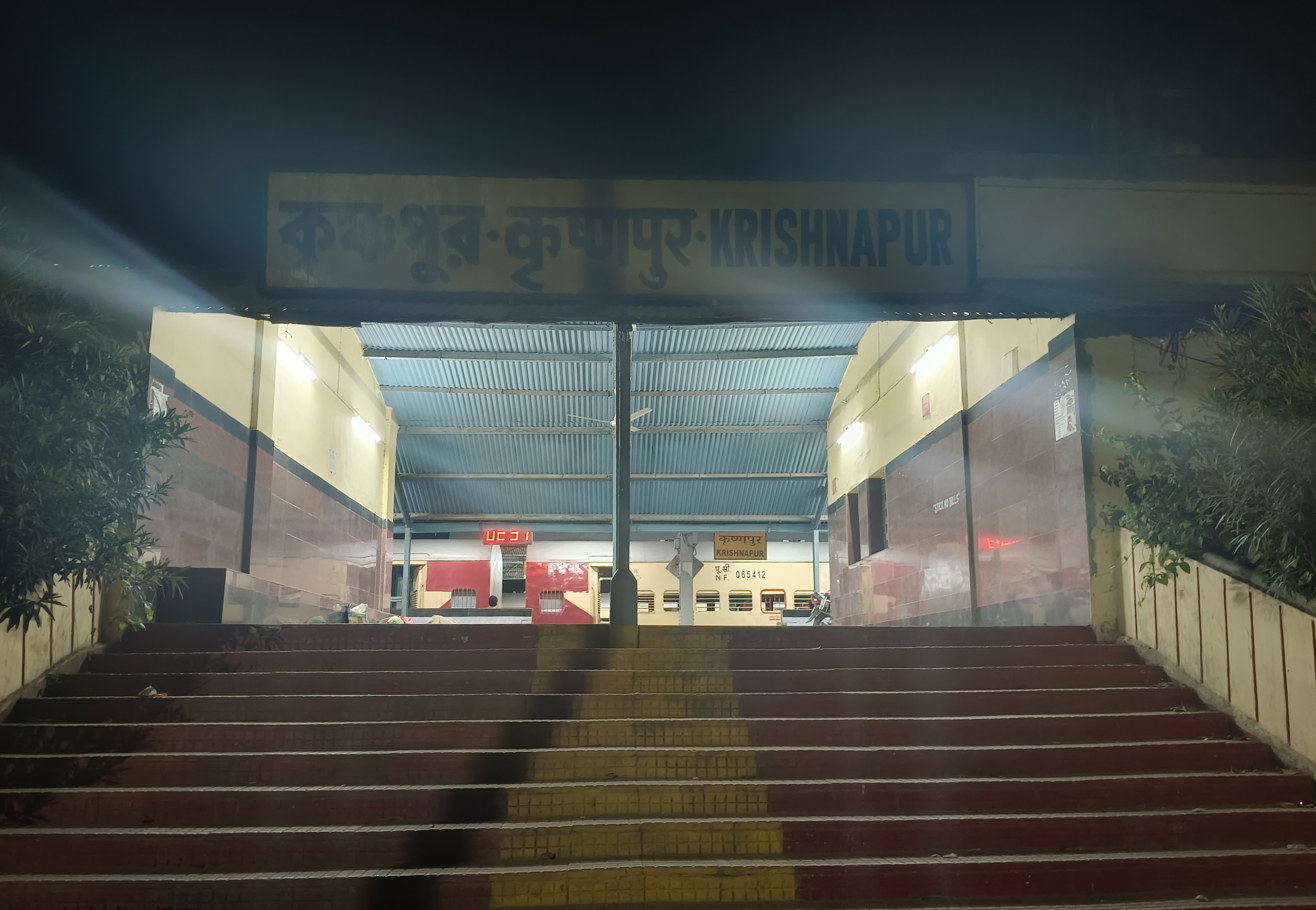

General information
- Location: Raghunathganj Road, Krishnapur, Lalgola, Murshidabad district, West Bengal; India
- Coordinates: 24.406469°N 88.256551°E
- Elevation: 26 m (85 ft)
- System: Passenger train and Suburban train station
- Owner: Indian Railways
- Operator: Eastern Railway zone
- Line: Sealdah-Lalgola line
- Platforms: 4
- Tracks: 5

Construction
- Structure type: Standard (on ground station)
- Parking: No

Other information
- Status: Active
- Station code: KRP
- Zone(s): Eastern Railway zone
- Division(s): Sealdah

History
- Former names: East Indian Railway Company

Services
Preceding station	Kolkata Suburban Railway	Following station
Pirtala towards Krishnanagar City Junction	Eastern Line Krishnanagar–Lalgola line	Lalgola Terminus
Route map
Location
- Location within West Bengal Location within India

Krishnapur is a railway station of the Sealdah-Lalgola line in the Eastern Railway of Indian Railways. The station is situated at Krishnapur or Kestopur near Lalgola in Murshidabad district in the Indian state of West Bengal. Total 12 trains including Lalgola Passengers and few EMU trains halt in the station.

== Electrification ==
The Krishnanagar–Lalgola section, including Krishnapur railway station was electrified in 2004. In 2010 the line became double tracked.

== Incident ==
On 15 December 2019, a protest was going on nearby area against Citizenship (Amendment) Act, 2019. Protesters vandalized Krishnapur railway station and at this station set several trains on fire.
