= Jalal Khali Halt railway station =

Railway station in West Bengal, India

JalalKhali Halt
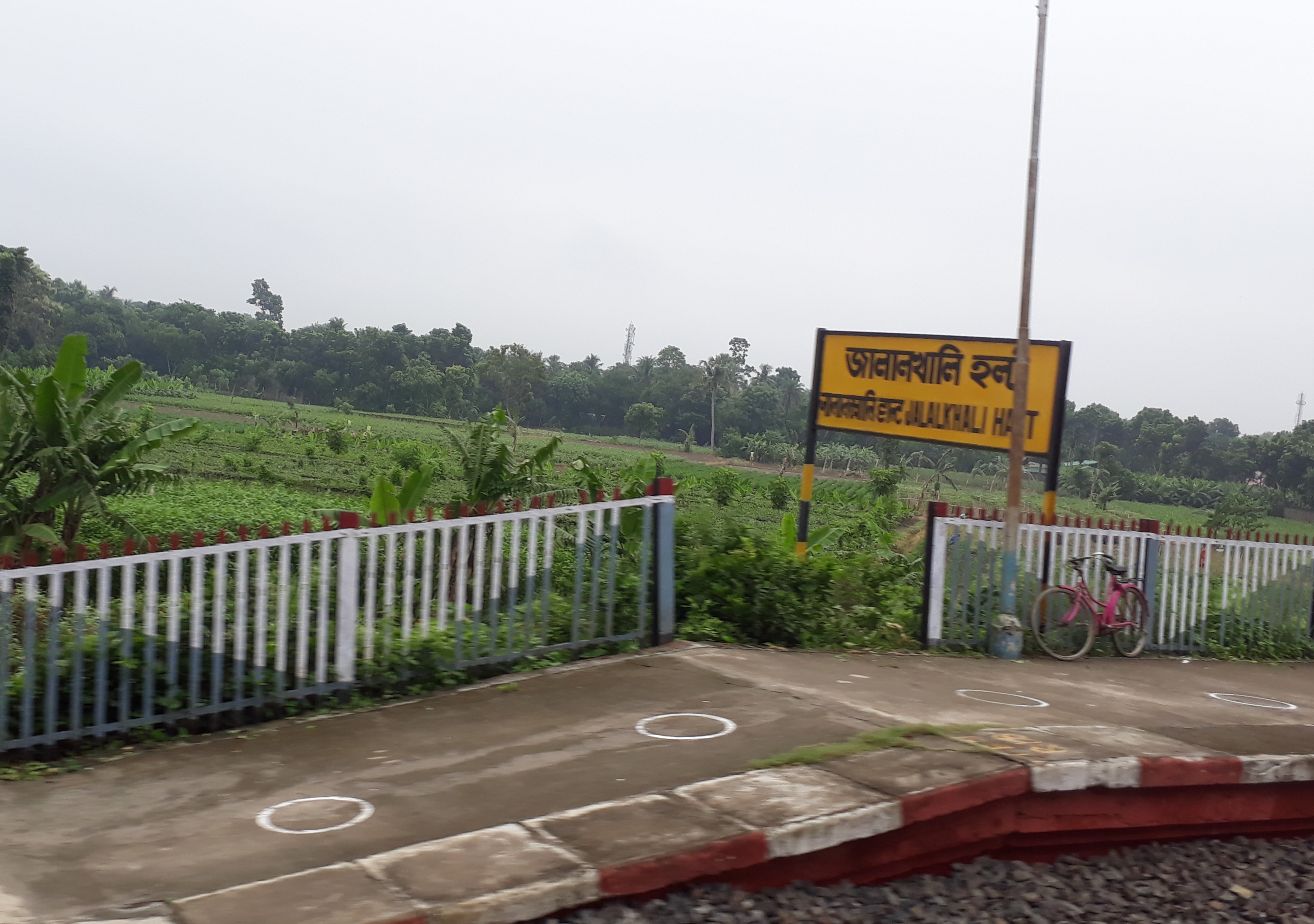

General information
- Location: JalalKhali, Nadia, West Bengal Pin code- 741102; India
- Coordinates: 23°20′50″N 88°30′50″E
- System: Halt Kolkata Suburban Railway station
- Owner: Indian Railways
- Operator: Eastern Railway
- Line: Ranaghat–Krishnanagar line of Kolkata Suburban Railway
- Platforms: 2
- Tracks: 2

Construction
- Structure type: At grade
- Parking: available
- Cycle facilities: available
- Accessible: Not available

Other information
- Status: Functional
- Station code: JKL
- Zone(s): Eastern Railway
- Division(s): Sealdah

History
- Opened: 1905
- Electrified: 1965

Services
Preceding station	Kolkata Suburban Railway	Following station
Badkulla towards Sealdah	Eastern Line Ranaghat–Krishnanagar line	Krishnanagar City Junction Terminus
Route map
Location
- Location within West Bengal Location within India

Jalal Khali Halt railway station is part of the Kolkata Suburban Railway system and operated by Eastern Railway. It is located on the Ranaghat–Krishnanagar line in Nadia in the Indian state of West Bengal.
