= Jiaganj Azimganj =

- City
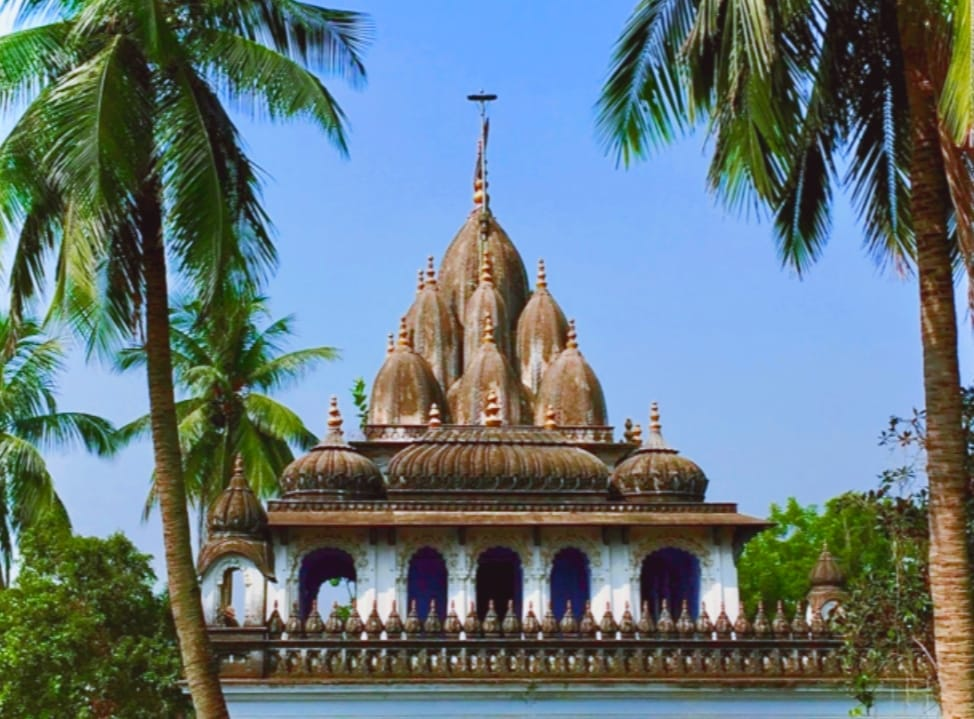
- Chintamani Parshvanath Jain temple in Azimganj

- Location in West Bengal, India Jiaganj Azimganj (India)
- Coordinates: 24.23°N 88.27°E
- Country: India
- State: West Bengal
- District: Murshidabad

Government
  - Type: Municipality
  - Body: Jiaganj Azimganj Municipality

Area
  - Total: 11.50 km^{2} (4.44 sq mi)
- Elevation: 30 m (98 ft)

Population (2001)
  - Total: 47,228
  - Density: 4,107/km^{2} (10,640/sq mi)

Languages
  - Official: Bengali, English
- Time zone: UTC+5:30 (IST)
- PIN: 742123 (Jiaganj); 742122 (Azimganj)
- Vehicle registration: WB57, WB58
- Lok Sabha constituency: Murshidabad

Jiaganj Azimganj is a city and a municipality in Murshidabad district in the Indian state of West Bengal.

== Geography ==
Cities, towns and locations in the Lalbag and Domkal subdivisions, Murshidabad district
M: municipal town, CT: census town, R: rural/ urban centre, H: historical place
Owing to space constraints in the small map, the actual locations in a larger map may vary slightly

=== Location ===
The two towns of Jiaganj and Azimganj are located on either side of the Baghirathi River, Jiaganj (Ziaganj) on the east bank and Azimganj on the west bank. Jiaganj is located at 24.2452°N 88.2685°E. Azimganj is located at 24.2362°N 88.2585°E.

Baluchar is the old name of Jiaganj, which was changed to Jiaganj after the Mughal Empire conquered Bengal, and gained control of Murshidabad.

=== Area overview ===
While the Lalbag subdivision is spread across both the natural physiographic regions of the district, Rarh and Bagri, the Domkal subdivision occupies the north-eastern corner of Bagri. In the map alongside, the Ganges/ Padma River flows along the northern portion. The border with Bangladesh can be seen in the north and the east. Murshidabad district shares with Bangladesh a porous international border which is notoriously crime prone (partly shown in this map). The Ganges has a tendency to change course frequently, causing severe erosion, mostly along the southern bank. The historic city of Murshidabad, a centre of major tourist attraction, is located in this area. In 1717, when Murshid Quli Khan became Subahdar, he made Murshidabad the capital of Subah Bangla (then Bengal, Bihar and Odisha). The entire area is overwhelmingly rural with over 90% of the population living in the rural areas.

Note: The map alongside presents some of the notable locations in the subdivisions. All places marked in the map are linked in the larger full screen map.

== Demographics ==
As of 2001 India census, Jiaganj Azimganj had a population of 47,228. Males constitute 51% of the population and females 49%. Jiaganj and Azimganj has an average literacy rate of 68% : male literacy is 73%, and female literacy is 62%. In Jiaganj Azimganj, 11% of the population is under 6 years of age. Hindus form 88.7% of the population while Jains form 1.3% of the city population. Muslims make up about 9% of the population; the remaining 1% are Sikhs, Buddhists and Christians.

== Neighbourhoods ==
=== Transport ===
The town's rail station is Jiaganj railway station.

=== Begamganj ===
Begamganj is an older locality in Jiaganj. The main marketplace in Jiaganj is within Begamjanj. The Boro Govinda Bari is a place of religious interest.

=== Azimganj ===
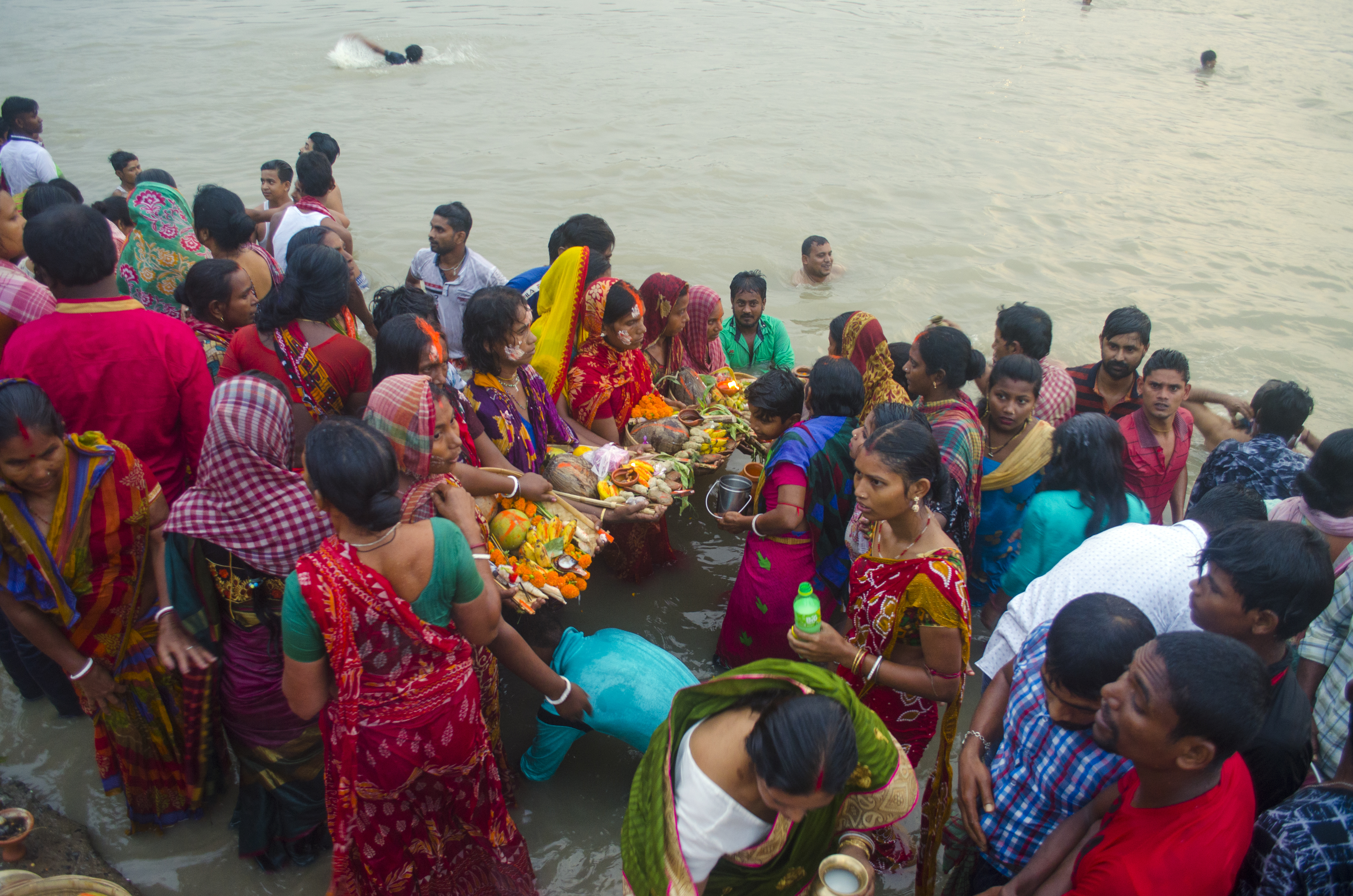
Chhath Puja celebration at Azimganj

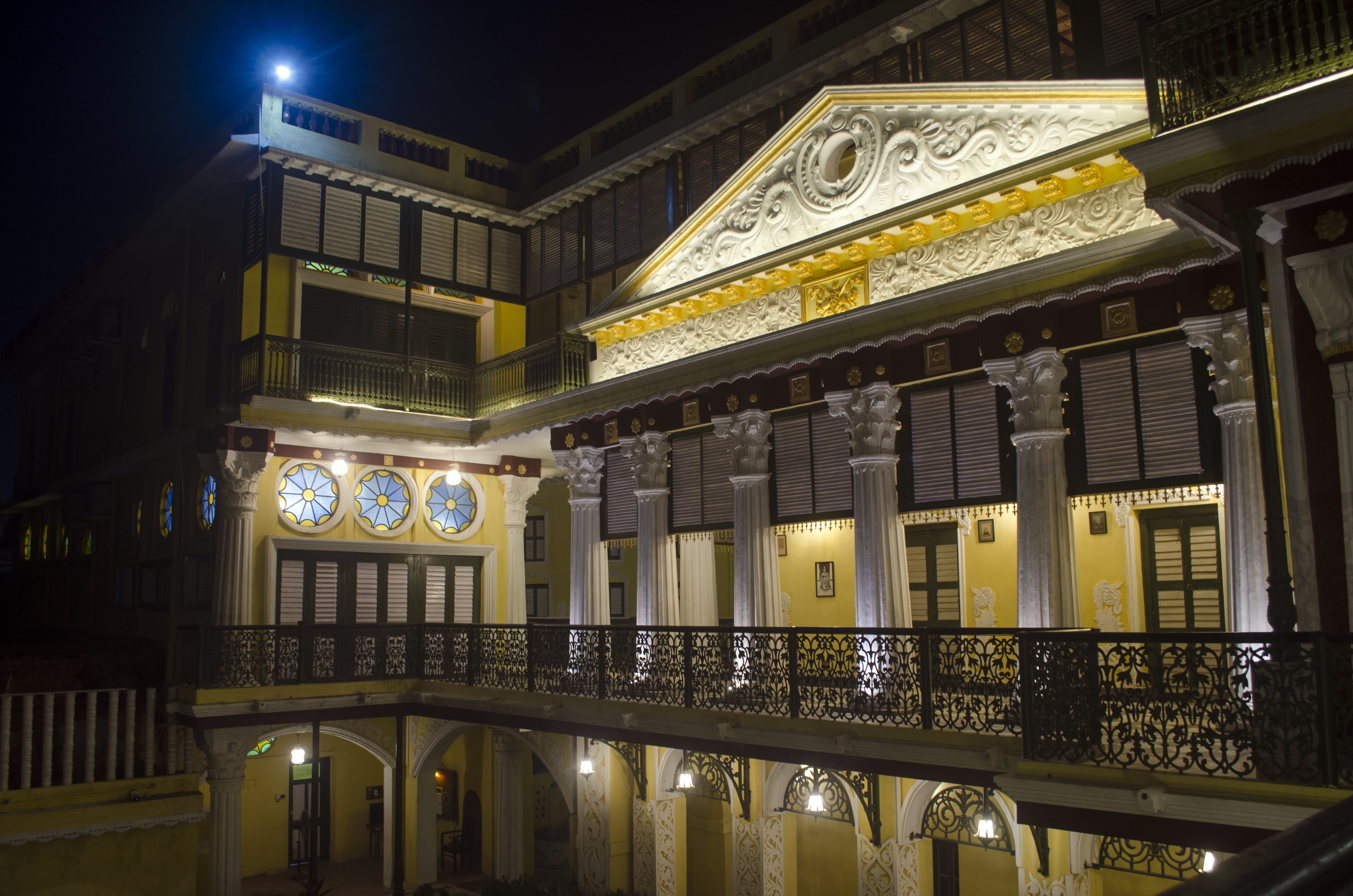
Bari Kothi, heritage hotel at Azimganj

Azimganj is situated at the west bank of river Bhagirathi. There are two railway stations Azimganj city and Azimganj junction. The old and historic city of Nawab period is situated near Azimganj city railway station.

==== Azimganj Rajbari ====
In the 18th century, the Sheherwalis community of Shwetambar Jain businessman from Rajasthan migrated to Murshidabad. They worked tirelessly to create their empires in textile and banking and went on to become Zamindars. The Sheherwalis adapted to the then prevalent cultural influences in the region namely, Mughal, British, Bengali and European and as such created their own unique culture over generations. They settled in the twin cities of Azimganj-Jiaganj. The most notable Sheherwali was Jagat Seth (literally, ‘universal banker’, title accorded by the Mughal empire).Jagat Seth family

== Education ==
Sripat Singh College was established in 1949 at Jiaganj. The Śvetāmbara Jain zemindar of Jiaganj, Sripat Singh Dugar, gifted the palatial out-house of his palace and a handsome sum in cash for the college. Affiliated with the University of Kalyani, it offers honours courses in Bengali, history, philosophy, political science, economics, physics, chemistry, mathematics and botany, and post graduation in Bengali.

Rani Dhanya Kumari College was initially started as an evening college in the premises of Sripat Singh College in 1962 at Jiaganj. It shifted to its present premises in 1972. Affiliated with the University of Kalyani, it offers honours courses in Bengali, English, sociology, political science, history, geography and BCom.

Rajmati Parichand Bothra Memorial Jiaganj College of Engineering and Technology at Jiaganj offers diploma courses in engineering.

Jiaganj Institute of Education & Training, Baluchar PTTI, Vivekanada Teachers' Training Institute, Jiaganj School of Nursing Training

== Connectivity ==
There are two parallel railway links on both the sides of river Bhagirathi. One is connecting Sealdah to Jiaganj through Lalgola branch line and another Howrah to Azimganj through Barharwa–Azimganj–Katwa loop. A new rail bridge is coming up over river Bhagirathi connecting Nashipur to Azimganj. Azimganj-Nalhati Railway line started in 1872.

Important train that originates from Azimganj Junction railway station :

1. Ganadevata Express (Daily)
2. Howrah–Malda Town Intercity Express (Daily)
3. Nabadwip Dham–Malda Town Express (Daily)

Apart from this through road links, Jiaganj is connected to adjacent townships like Lalbagh (Murshidabad), Berhampore, Lalgola, Bhagabangola.

Important train that goes through Jiaganj railway station :

1. Bhagirathi Express (Daily)
2. Hazarduari Express (Daily)
3. Dhano Dhanye Express

Jiaganj and Azimganj are connected by boat service managed by local municipality on river Bhagirathi.

== Jain temples ==
There are several historic Jain temples in the city including Sri Neminath Swami, Chintamani Parasnath, Shantinath, Gaudi Parshwanath, Padmaprabha, and Sanwalia Parasnath (Rambagh) temples and a dadabadi at Rambagh.

Jiaganj 1. Shree Shambhabnath Ji, 2. Shree Adinath Ji, 3. Shree Bimalnath Ji, 4. Shree Adinath Ji, Kathgola temple, 5. Dadabari at Kiratbagh, 6. Basupujya Parswanath Swami Jinalaya at Kiratbagh, Mahavir Swami Digambar Jain Mandir.

== Healthcare ==
Jiaganj Rural Hospital functions with 30 beds at Jiaganj and Azimganj Primary Health Centre at Azimganj functions with 15 beds.

== Notable people ==
- Arijit Singh, Playback singer
- Mir Afsar Ali, News presenter, actor and Radio jockey of Radio Mirchi
- Indra Dugar, Painter
- Bidhayak Bhattacharya Scriptwriter, actor, author
- Hari Makhan Das and his disciple Radharani Devi, who was also a noted film-actress of 1930s-40s, a contemporary co-actress of Kanan Bala.
- Anwara Bahar Chowdhury, Social activist and writer

== Sources ==
- Indian trains
- Official site of Jiaganj Azimganj Municipality
- Personal website of Jiaganj Azimganj Murshidabad Town
- DEBIPUR M. G. D. HIGH SCHOOL JIAGANJ-AZIMGANJ (M)
