= Hazarduari Express =

Train in India

Overview
- Service type: Express
- Locale: West Bengal
- First service: 7 February 2009; 17 years ago
- Current operator: Eastern Railway

Route
- Termini: Kolkata (KOAA); Lalgola (LGL)
- Stops: 12
- Distance travelled: 225 km (140 mi)
- Average journey time: 4 hrs 50 mins
- Service frequency: Daily
- Train number: 13113 / 13114

On-board services
- Classes: Second Class Seating, AC Chair Car, General Unreserved
- Seating arrangements: Yes
- Sleeping arrangements: No
- Auto-rack arrangements: Overhead racks
- Catering facilities: On-board catering, E-catering
- Baggage facilities: No
- Other facilities: Below the seats

Technical
- Rolling stock: ICF coach
- Track gauge: 1,676 mm (5 ft 6 in)
- Operating speed: 50 km/h (31 mph) average including halts.
Route map
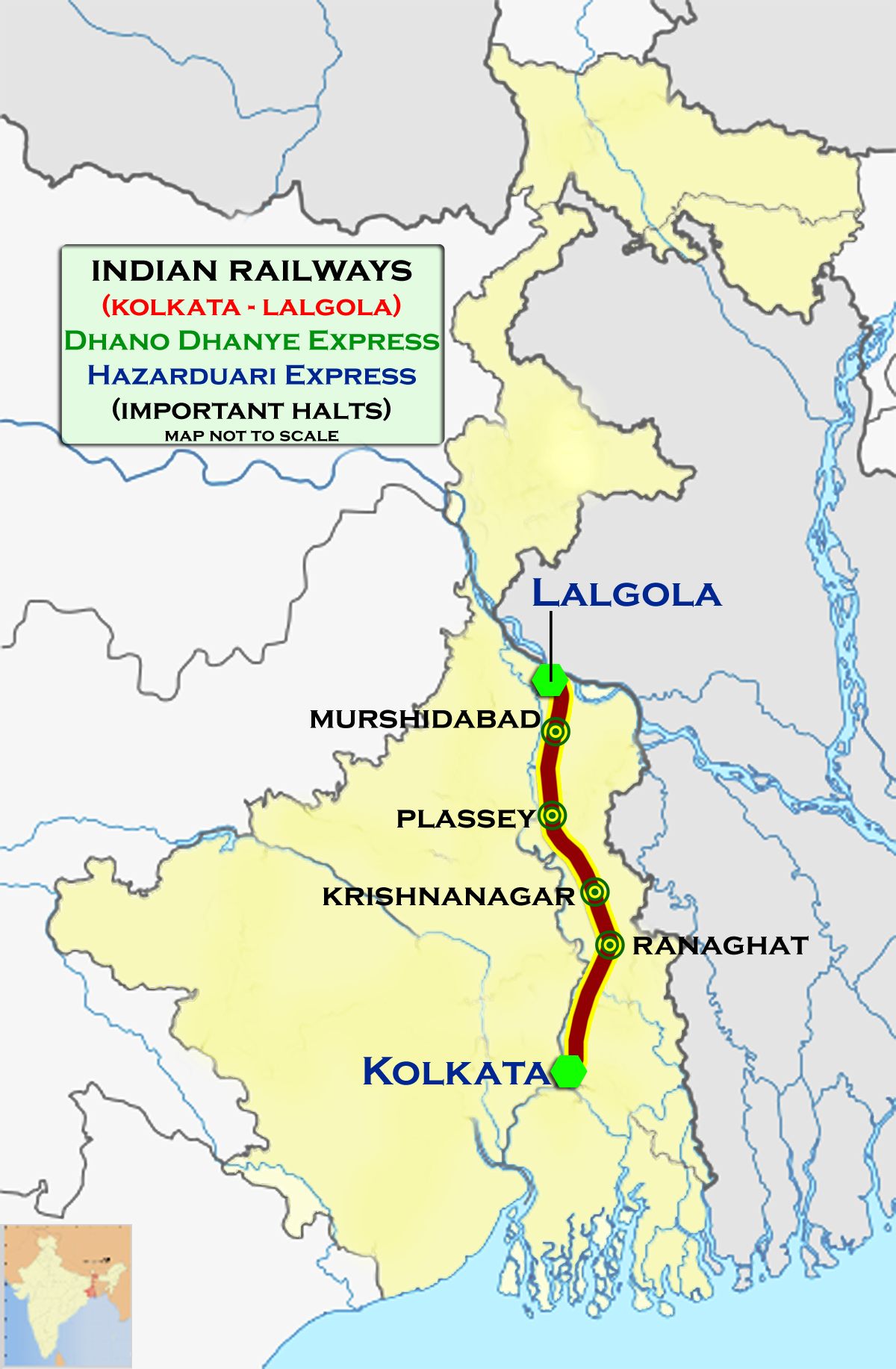

The 13113 / 13114 Hazarduari Express is an express-type train of Indian Railways connecting Kolkata with Lalgola in Murshidabad district of West Bengal. It is named after the famous Hazarduari Palace. It is a daytime train covering 225 kilometers at an average speed of 50 km/h.

== Facilities ==
An advance reservation period of 60 days is available for this train. 3 AC chair cars, 2 Second class sitting coach, 5 general sitting coach including guard coach cum luggage break van are available in it. Pantry car service is not available in it.

== Traction ==
Both trains are hauled by a Howrah Loco Shed-based WAP-5 / WAP-7 electric locomotive on its entire journey.

== Route and halts ==
- Kolkata
- Barrackpore
- Ranaghat Junction
- Krishnanagar City Junction
- Bethuadahari
- Debagram
- Plassey
- Beldanga
- Berhampore Court
- Cossimbazar
- Murshidabad
- Jiaganj
- Bhagwangola
- Lalgola

== Timings ==
- 13113 Hazarduari Express leaves Kolkata Railway station at 6:50 am in morning everyday and reaches Lalgola same day at 11:20 am. Reaches Bhagwangola at 10:47 am, Jiaganj at 10:36 am, Murshidabad station at 10:27 am, Berhampore Court Station at 10:14 am, Plassey at 9:32 am, Debagram at 9:13 am, Bethuadahari at 9:03 am, Krishnanagar at 8:50 am, Ranaghat at 8:20 am, Barrackpore at 7:20 am,
- 13114 Hazarduari Express departs Lalgola at 4:30 pm in afternoon via Bhagwangola (at 4:41 pm), Jiaganj (4:53 pm), Murshidabad(at 5:01 pm), Berhampore Court (at 5:14 pm), Beldanga (at 5:34 pm), Plassey (at 5:50 pm), Debagram (at 6:03 pm), Bethuadahari (at 6:13 pm), Krishnanagar (at 6:56 pm), Ranaghat (at 7:36 pm), Barrackpore (at 8:41 pm) and reaches Kolkata Railway station at 9:40 pm same day.
