= Fast Passenger =

Fast Passenger may refer to

- Slow and fast passenger trains in India, passenger train services of Indian Railways
- Fast Passenger (KSRTC), inter-city/inter-state bus service operated by the Kerala State Road Transport Corporation
- Super Fast Passenger, inter-city/inter-state bus service operated by the Kerala State Road Transport Corporation
