= Barharwa–Azimganj–Katwa loop =

Railway line connecting Barharwa and Katwa, West Bengal

Barharwa–Azimganj–Katwa loop (incl. Nalhati–Azimganj branch line)
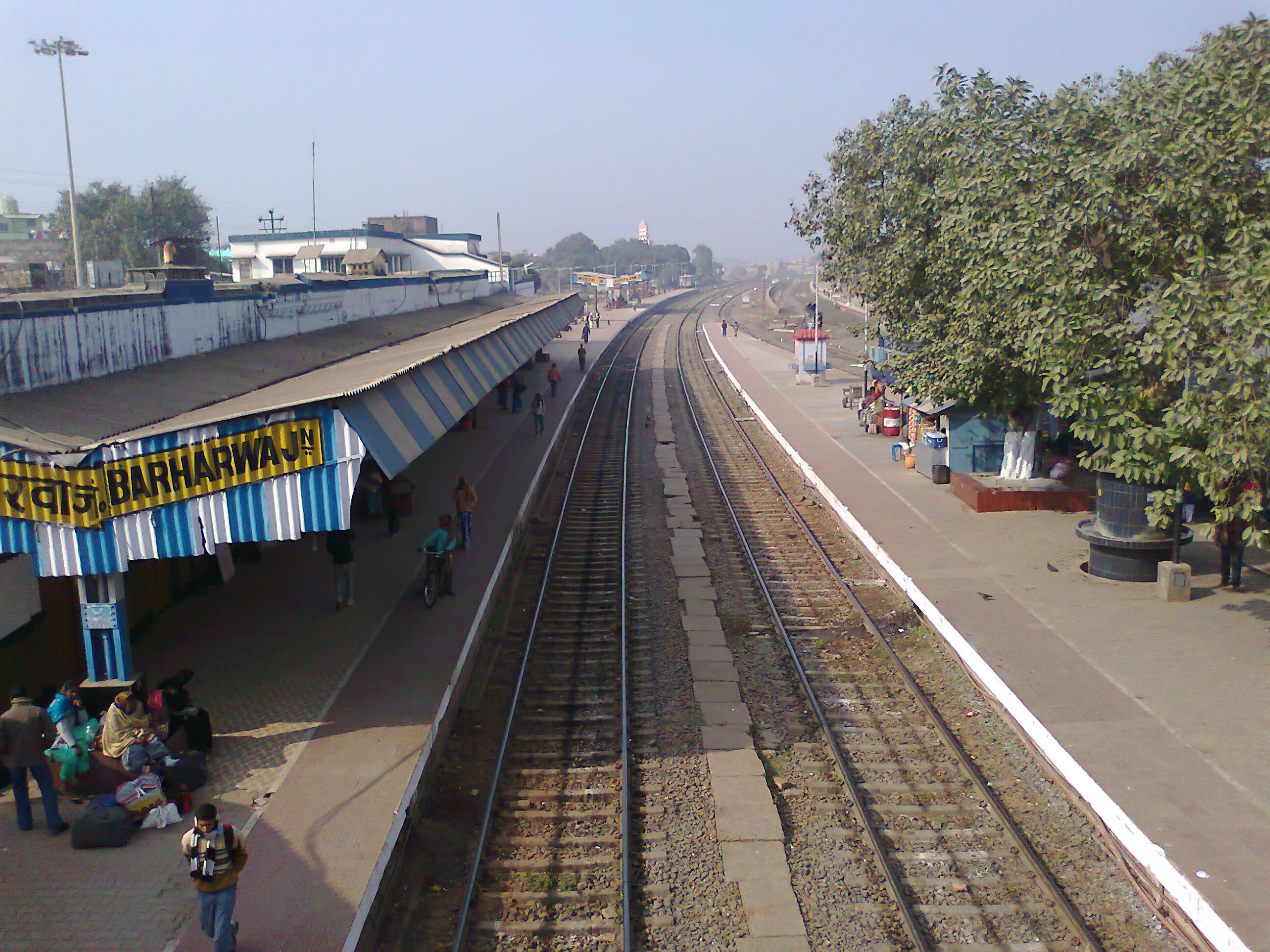
- Barharwa Junction is an important railway station of Barharwa–Azimganj–Katwa loop

Overview
- Status: Operational
- Owner: Indian Railways
- Locale: Jharkhand, West Bengal
- Termini: Barharwa; Katwa
- Stations: 39

Service
- Operator(s): Eastern Railway

History
- Opened: 1913

Technical
- Line length: 170 km (106 mi)
- Number of tracks: 2
- Track gauge: 5 ft 6 in (1,676 mm) broad gauge
- Electrification: Yes
- Operating speed: Up to 100 km/h (62 mph)

The Barharwa–Azimganj–Katwa loop is a railway line connecting Barharwa on the Sahibganj loop and Katwa. Together with the Bandel–Katwa line, which connects this line to Bandel Junction on the Howrah–Bardhaman main line, it is also known as the B.B Loop Line. This 170 kilometres (110 mi) line is under the jurisdiction of Eastern Railway. The majority of this line passes through the Purba Bardhaman and Murshidabad districts, in the Indian state of West Bengal, and lies on the west bank of the Bhagirathi river.

== History ==
In 1913, the Barharwa–Azimganj–Katwa Railway constructed the Barharwa–Azimganj–Katwa loop line. This line connected Barharwa Junction one the Sahibganj loop with the Katwa Junction in what was then the Hooghly–Katwa Railway.

=== Nalhati–Azimganj branch line ===
In 1863, the Indian Branch Railway Company, a private company constructed the Nalhati-Azimganj branch line. The line was 27 miles (43 km) long and was constructed with a unique rail gauge of 4 ft (1,219 mm). The Indian Branch Railway Company was purchased by the Government of India in 1872 and the line was renamed as the Nalhati State Railway and was converted into 5 ft 6 in (1,676 mm) broad gauge. It became a part of the East Indian Railway Company in 1892.

=== Connection with North Bengal ===
With the partition of India in 1947, the connection to North Bengal was lost since a major portion of the Calcutta-Siliguri line ran through East Pakistan, now Bangladesh. To establish connectivity with North Bengal, a 10 km (6 mi) new line was built from Tildanga station in the B.B loop line to Farakka Ghat on the south bank of Ganges by 1958. A 37 km (23 mi) long 1,676 mm (5 ft 6 in) wide 5 ft 6 in (1,676 mm) broad gauge new line was constructed from Khejuria Ghat (near present-day Chamagram station), on the north bank of the Ganga to Malda Town by 1959 and was further extended to meet Barsoi junction by 1962. Steamer services connected the north and south banks of the river thereby linking North & South Bengal.

The 2,240 m (7,350 ft) long Farakka Barrage, which carries a rail-cum-road bridge across the Ganges was opened in 1971 thereby directly linking the B.B loop line to Malda Town, New Jalpaiguri and other railway stations in North Bengal.

=== Connection with Murshidabad ===
While most of the line runs along the West bank of the Bhagirathi River, the district headquarters of Murshidabad and the major towns of Berhampore and Jiaganj are located on the East bank of the Bhagirathi river on the Seladah-Lalgola line. A railway bridge was constructed as a part of a line from Nashipur Road to Azimganj for stone traffic in 1928 which connected both the banks. This bridge however was destroyed in the Second World War. This has led to connectivity problems and as a result the Nashipur Rail Bridge was constructed. However since approach roads couldn't be built due to land acquisition problems and local protests, the tracks leading to the bridge couldn't be constructed because of which the connection to Murshidabad still lies incomplete. Once completed Indian Railways plans to use it for the North bound trains from Sealdah like Darjeeling Mail as it provides a shorter route leading to significant savings in cost and time.

== Electrification ==
The electrification of the stretch from Katwa to Nimtita and from Nalhati to Azimganj was completed on 04 February 2021. Its completion marked the 100% electrification of the entire Eastern Railway zone of the Indian Railways.
