= Sealdah–Jalpaiguri Road Humsafar Express =

Train in India

Sealdah - Jalpaiguri Road Humsafar Express

Overview
- Service type: Humsafar Express
- First service: 14 June 2025; 9 months ago
- Current operator: Eastern Railways

Route
- Termini: Sealdah (SDAH); Jalpaiguri Road (JPE)
- Stops: 15
- Distance travelled: 587 km (365 mi)
- Average journey time: 12 hrs 20 mins
- Service frequency: Weekly
- Train number: 13115 / 13116

On-board services
- Class: AC 3 tier
- Seating arrangements: Yes
- Sleeping arrangements: Yes
- Catering facilities: Available
- Observation facilities: Large windows
- Baggage facilities: Yes

Technical
- Rolling stock: LHB Humsafar
- Track gauge: 1,676 mm (5 ft 6 in)
- Operating speed: 51 km/h (32 mph)

The Sealdah - Jalpaiguri Road Humsafar Express is a superfast Humsafar Express train of the Indian Railways connecting Sealdah in Kolkata, West Bengal and Jalpaiguri Road in Jalpaiguri,West Bengal. It is currently being operated with the train numbers 13115/13116 on a weekly basis.

== Coach composition ==
The train is completely 3-tier AC sleeper designed by Indian Railways with features of LED screen display to show information about stations, train speed etc. and will have announcement system as well, Vending machines for tea, coffee and milk, Bio toilets in compartments as well as CCTV cameras.

== Route and halts ==
The important halts of the train are as follows:

- Sealdah (starts)
- Naihati Junction
- Ranaghat Junction
- Krishnanagar City Junction
- Berhampore Court
- Azimganj Junction
- Jangipur Road
- New Farakka Junction
- Malda Town
- Samsi
- Barsoi Junction
- Kishanganj
- Aluabari Road Junction
- New Jalpaiguri (Siliguri)
- Jalpaiguri Road (Ends)

== Coaches ==
Sealdah Jalpaiguri Road Humsafar Express contains 15 third AC Humsafar Coaches, One Pantry Car and one Generator car.

== Traction ==
The train is hauled by an Sealdah Loco Shed-based WAP-7 locomotive from Sealdah to Jalpaiguri Road and vice-versa .

== Operation ==
- 13115 Sealdah - Jalpaiguri Road Humsafar Express runs from Sealdah every Friday at 11:40 PM reaching Jalpaiguri Road on next day (Saturday) at 12 pm .
- 13116 Jalpaiguri Road – Sealdah Humsafar Express runs from Jalpaiguri Road every Saturday at 8:30 PM reaching Sealdah on next day (Sunday) at 8:10 am.

== See also ==
- Sealdah–Jammu Tawi Humsafar Express
- Sealdah - New Jalpaiguri Darjeeling Mail
- Sealdah - New Alipurduar Padatik Express
- Sealdah - Alipurduar Kanchan Kanya Express
- Sealdah - New Alipurduar Teesta Torsa Express
- Sealdah - Bamanhat Uttar Banga Express
