= Bhagirathi Express =

Train in India

Overview
- Service type: Express
- Locale: West Bengal
- First service: 31 March 1983; 43 years ago
- Current operator: Eastern Railway

Route
- Termini: Sealdah (SDAH); Lalgola (LGL)
- Stops: 12
- Distance travelled: 228 km (142 mi)
- Average journey time: 4 hours 20 minutes
- Service frequency: Daily
- Train number: 13103 / 13104

On-board services
- Classes: General Unreserved, Second Class Seating, AC Chair Car
- Seating arrangements: Yes
- Sleeping arrangements: No
- Auto-rack arrangements: Overhead racks
- Catering facilities: E-catering
- Observation facilities: Large windows
- Baggage facilities: Available
- Other facilities: Below the seats

Technical
- Rolling stock: ICF coach
- Track gauge: 1,676 mm (5 ft 6 in)
- Operating speed: 53 km/h (33 mph) average including halts.
Route map
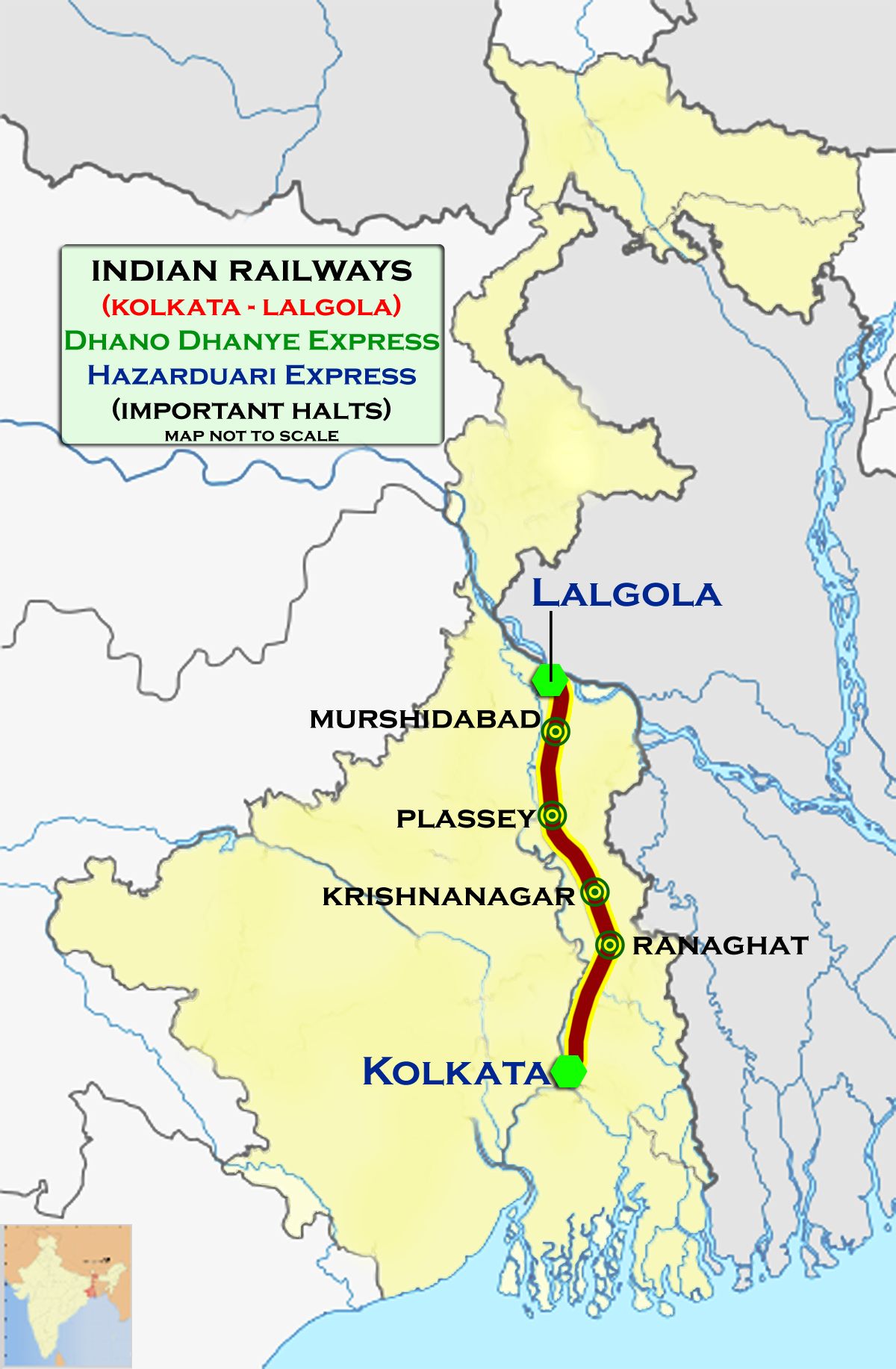

The 13103 / 13104 Bhagirathi Express is an express train running between Sealdah and Lalgola, thereby linking Kolkata with the Murshidabad district, in the state of West Bengal. This train covers 228 km (142 mi) of distance at an average speed of 52 km/h (32 mph), and through its journey, it passes through important stations like Ranaghat, Krishnanagar, Bethuadahari, Debagram, Plassey, Beldanga, Berhampore, Murshidabad, Jiaganj, Bhagawangola, Lalgola.

== Facilities ==
Coaches available in this train are: AC Chair Car (3), Second Sitting (4) and General (6). All the classes except general class requires prior reservation. Tatkal booking is available in this train. Pantry car facility is not available. Throughout its journey it is hauled by WAP-5 or WAP-7 or WAG-5 class of locomotive.

== Train detail ==
Detail of Bhagirathi Express
Train No.	Sector
13103	Sealdah – Lalgola
13104	Lalgola – Sealdah

Up Bhagirathi Express (13103) leaves Sealdah at 6:20 pm via Ranaghat (7:53 pm), Krishnanagar (8:22 pm), Bethuadahari (8:45 pm), Plassey (9:08 pm), Beldanga (9:28 pm), Berhampore court (9:49 pm), Murshidabad (10:04 pm), Jiaganj (10:12 pm), Bhagwangola (10:23 pm) and reaches Lalgola at 10:50 pm.

Down Bhagirathi Express (13104) leaves Lalgola at 5:40 am in morning, reaches Bhagwangola at 5:51 am, Jiaganj at 6:03 am, Murshidabad at 6:11 am, Berhampore court at 6:30 am, Beldanga at 6:48 am, Plassey at 7:10 am, Bethuadahari at 7:34 am, Krishnanagar at 8:12, Ranaghat at 8:50 am and reaches Sealdah at 10:10 am on the same day.

Eastern Railway is planning to increase speed of all Non-Suburban trains between Krishnanagar & Lalgola to reduce travel time by 15-30 mins. Speeding up of Non suburban trains in Sealdah-Krishnanagar stretch is not possible due to high frequency Suburban train services.
