= Krishnanagar City Junction railway station =

Railway station in West Bengal, India

Krishnanagar City Junction
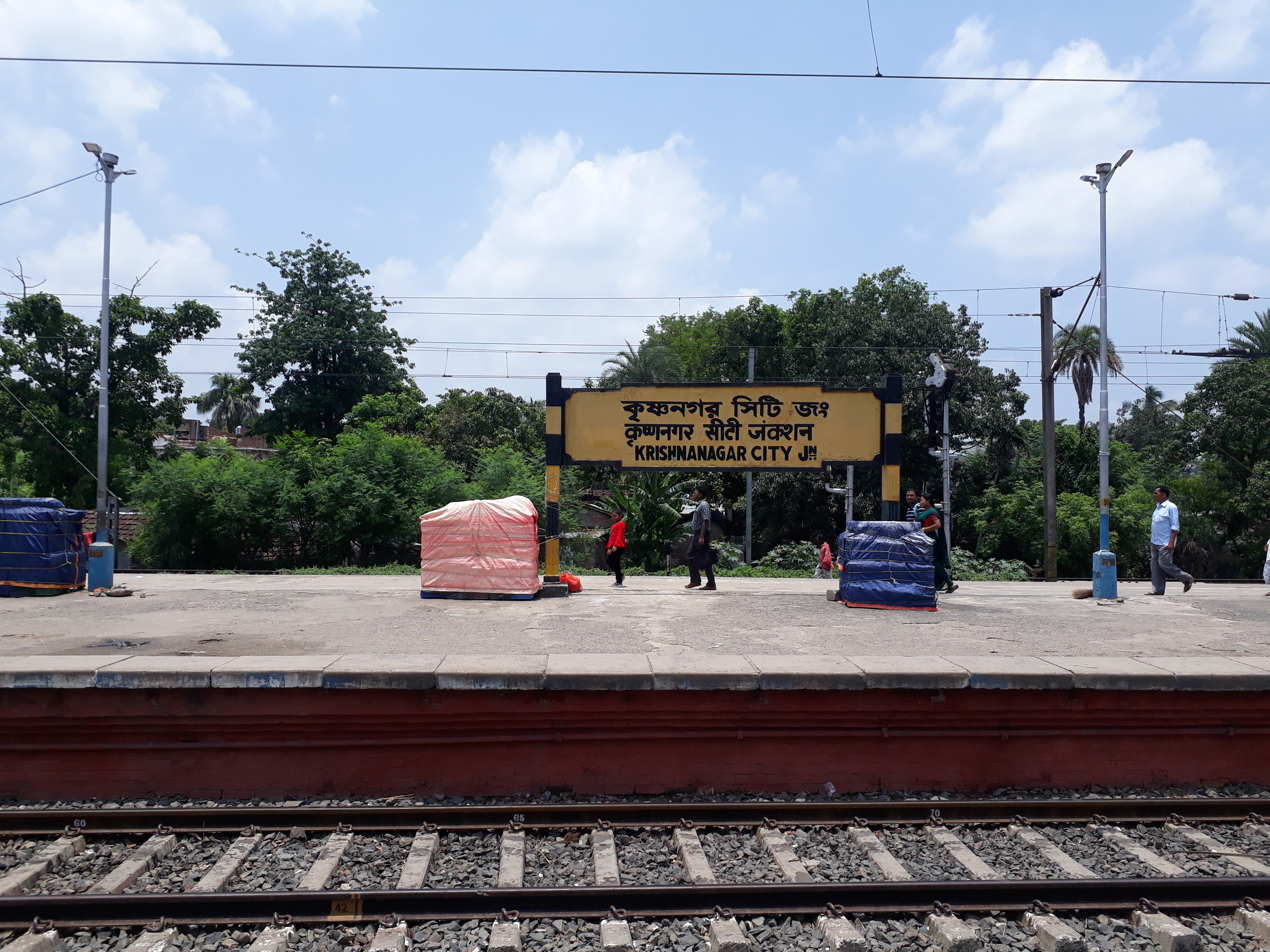
- Krishnanagar City Junction railway station

General information
- Location: Krishnanagar, Nadia, West Bengal; India
- Coordinates: 23°23′18″N 88°29′37″E
- System: Kolkata Suburban Railway station
- Owner: Indian Railways
- Operator: Eastern Railway
- Lines: Ranaghat–Krishnanagar line of Kolkata Suburban Railway, Shantipur-Krishnanagar line of Kolkata Suburban Railway & incomplete Krishnanagar-Nabadwip Dham line of Kolkata Suburban Railway
- Platforms: 5
- Tracks: 6

Construction
- Structure type: At grade
- Parking: Available
- Cycle facilities: Not available
- Accessible: Not available

Other information
- Status: Functional
- Station code: KNJ
- Zone(s): Eastern Railway
- Division(s): Sealdah

History
- Opened: 1905
- Electrified: 1965

Services
Preceding station	Kolkata Suburban Railway	Following station
Dignagar towards Sealdah	Eastern Line Kalinarayanpur–Shantipur–Krishnanagar line	Amghata Terminus
Jalal Khali Halt towards Sealdah	Eastern Line Ranaghat–Krishnanagar City–Lalgola line	Bahadurpur towards Lalgola
Route map
Location
- Location within West Bengal Location within India

Krishnanagar City Junction railway station is part of the Kolkata Suburban Railway system and operated by Eastern Railway. It is situated in Krishnanagar, Nadia on the Ranaghat–Krishnanagar line in Nadia in the Indian state of West Bengal. It is 100.2 kilometres (62.3 mi) from Sealdah & Junction point of Ranaghat, Shantipur & Nabadwip Ghat station railway lines. Shantipur is 15.3 kilometres (9.5 mi) from Krishnanagar & Nabadwip Ghat is 12.3 kilometres (7.6 mi) from Krishnanagar. Due to land problems Krishnanagar-Nabadwip Dham Line project is stuck from 2015 despite the 652 metres (2,139 ft) long bridge completed on Hooghly river & Broad Gauge Line reaching till Amghata.
