= Lalgola railway station =

Railway station in West Bengal, India

LALGOLA
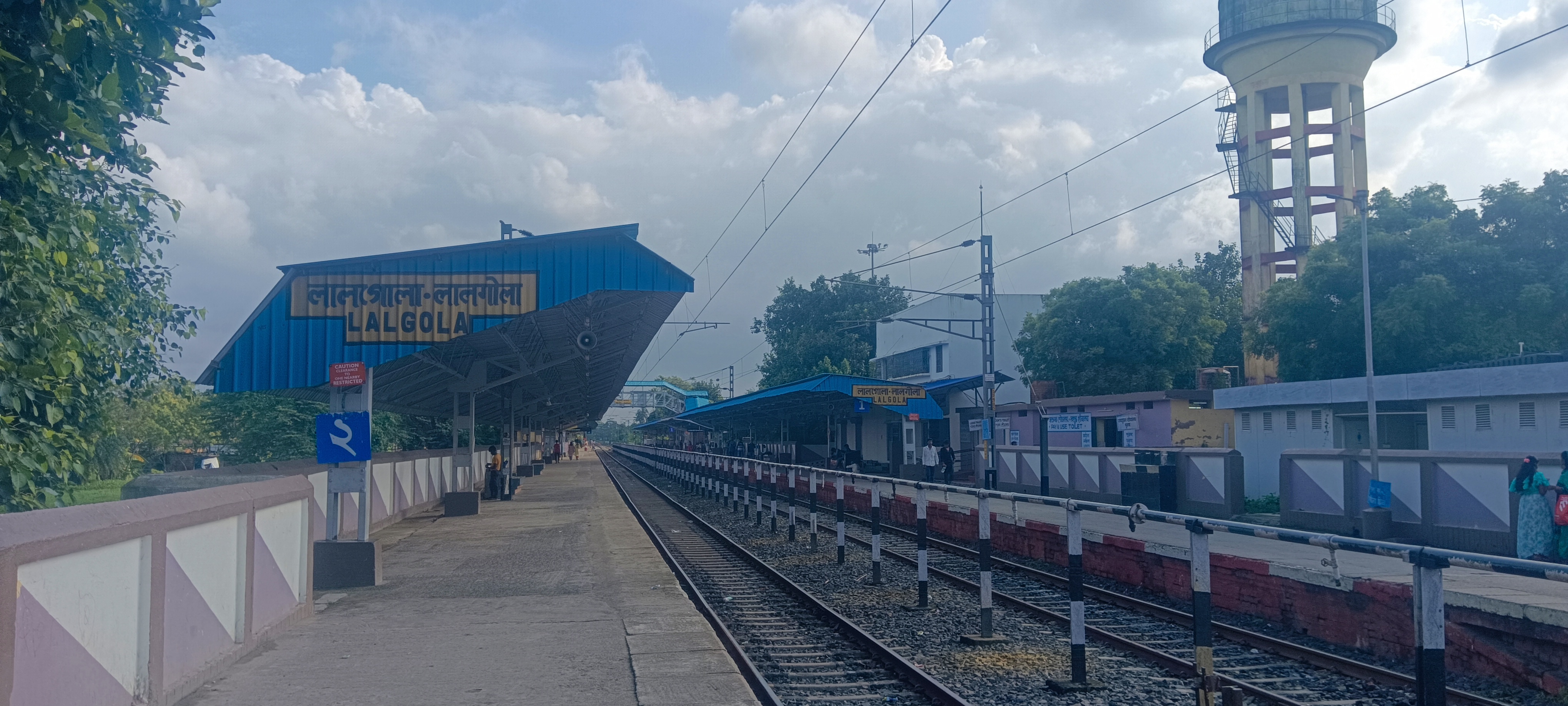

General information
- Location: Lalgola, Murshidabad district, West Bengal; India
- Coordinates: 24.421321°N 88.257976°E
- Elevation: 26 m (85 ft)
- System: Indian Railways
- Line: Sealdah-Lalgola line

Construction
- Structure type: Standard (on ground)
- Parking: Available

Other information
- Status: Active
- Station code: LGL
- Zone(s): Eastern Railway zone
- Division(s): Sealdah

Services
Preceding station	Kolkata Suburban Railway	Following station
Krishnapur towards Sealdah	Eastern Line Krishnanagar–Lalgola line	Terminus
Route map
Location
- Location within West Bengal

Lalgola railway station is a railway station at Lalgola of Murshidabad district in West Bengal. This is the terminal railway station of Sealdah-Lalgola line.

== History ==
The Ranaghat–Lalgola branch line was opened in 1905.
