= Bhagawangola I =

Bhagawangola I Bhagabangola I
- Community development block
- Interactive map of Bhagawangola I
- Coordinates: 24.330°N 88.293°E
- Country: India
- State: West Bengal
- District: Murshidabad

Government
  - Type: Federal democracy

Area
  - Total: 152.68 km^{2} (58.95 sq mi)
- Elevation: 24 m (79 ft)

Population (2011)
  - Total: 202,071
  - Density: 1,323.5/km^{2} (3,427.8/sq mi)

Languages
  - Official: Bengali, English

Literacy
  - Literacy (2011): 57.22%
- Time zone: UTC+5:30 (IST)
- PIN: 742135 (Bhagawangola); 742135 (Mahisasthali); 742179 (Habaspur)
- Telephone/STD code: 03482
- ISO 3166 code: IN-WB
- Vehicle registration: WB-57, WB-58
- Lok Sabha constituency: Murshidabad
- Vidhan Sabha constituency: Bhagabangola, Lalgola
- Website: murshidabad.gov.in

Bhagawangola I is a community development block that forms an administrative division in the Lalbag subdivision of Murshidabad district in the Indian state of West Bengal.

== Geography ==
Bhagawangola is located at 24.330°N 88.293°E

Bhagawangola I CD block is bounded by Lalgola CD block and Godagari Upazila in Rajshahi District of Bangladesh, across the Padma, in the north, Bhagawangola II and Raninagar I CD blocks in the east, Murshidabad-Jiaganj and Berhampore CD blocks in the south and Nabagram CD block in the west.

Bhagawangola I CD block lies in the Jalangi-Bhagirathi Interfluve physiographic region in Murshidabad district. The Bhagirathi River splits the district into two natural physiographic regions – Rarh on the west and Bagri on the east. The Padma River separates Murshidabad district from Malda district and Chapai Nawabganj and Rajshahi districts of Bangladesh in the north. It is a low-lying area having alluvial soil pattern.

Murshidabad district has a 125.35 km long international border with Bangladesh of which 42.35 km is on land and the remaining is riverine. There are 9 blocks – Samserganj, Suti I, Suti II, Raghunathganj II, Lalgola, Bhagawangola I, Bhagawangola II, Raninagar II and Jalangi - along the Bangladesh-India border.

The Bagri or the eastern part of the district is a low lying alluvial plain with the shape of an isosceles triangle. The Ganges/Padma and the Bhagirathi form the two equal sides; the Jalangi forms the entire base; other offshoots of the Ganges meander within the area. It is liable to flooding by the Bhagirathi and other rivers. The main rivers of this region are Bhairab, Jalangi, Chhoto Bhairab, Sialmari and Gobra Nala. All these rivers are distributaries of the main branch of the Ganges. The rivers are in their decaying stages.

A major problem in Murshidabad district is river bank erosion. As of 2013, an estimated 2.4 million people reside along the banks of the Ganges alone in Murshidabad district. Between 1931 and 1977, 26,769 hectares have been eroded and many villages have been fully submerged. 1980-1990 was a decade of erosion for this district and during the decade Giria, Sekhalipur, Khejustala, Mithipur, Fajilpur, Rajapur, Akheriganj, Parashpur villages were badly affected. Many families living along the Ganges continue to be affected. As for example, in 2008, 1,245 families were affected in Lalgola, Bhagawangola I and Bhagawangola II CD Blocks.

See also - River bank erosion along the Ganges in Malda and Murshidabad districts

Bhagawangola I CD Block has an area of 136.10 km^{2}. It has 1 panchayat samity, 8 gram panchayats, 127 gram sansads (village councils), 59 mouzas and 54 inhabited villages. Bhagawangola police station serves this block. The headquarters of this CD Block is at Bhagawangola.

Gram panchayats in Bhagawangola I block/ panchayat samiti are: Bhagawangola, Habaspur, Hanumanta Nagar, Kantanagar, Kuthirampur, Mahammadpur, Mahisasthali and Sundarpur.

== Demographics ==
=== Population ===
According to the 2011 Census of India, Bhagawangola I CD block had a total population of 202,071, all of which were rural. There were 103,419 (51%) males and 98,652 (49%) females. Population in the age range 0–6 years numbered 28,933. Scheduled Castes numbered 14,557 (7.20%) and Scheduled Tribes numbered 227 (0.14%).

As per 2001 census, Bhagawangola I block has a total population of 163,438, out of which 84,035 were males and 79,403 were females. Bhagawangola I block registered a population growth of 23.90% during the 1991-2001 decade. Decadal growth for the district was 23.70 per cent. Decadal growth in West Bengal was 17.84 per cent.

Decadal Population Growth Rate (%)

- Bhagawagola I CD block
- Murshidabad district
- West Bengal

The decadal growth of population in Bhagawangola I CD block in 2001-2011 was 23.62%.

The decadal growth rate of population in Murshidabad district was as follows: 33.5% in 1951-61, 28.6% in 1961-71, 25.5% in 1971-81, 28.2% in 1981-91, 23.8% in 1991-2001 and 21.1% in 2001-11. The decadal growth rate for West Bengal in 2001-11 was 13.93%.

The decadal growth rate of population in neighbouring Rajshahi District, across the Ganges, in Bangladesh, was 13.48% for the decade 2001-2011, down from 21.19% in the decade 1991-2001.

There are reports of Bangladeshi infiltrators entering Murshidabad district.

=== Villages ===
Large villages in Bhagawangola I CD block were (2011 population figures in brackets): Dakshin Hanumanta Nagar (19,813), Kantanagar (15,587), Mahishasthali (17,785), Belia Syampur (11,847), Upar Orahar (4,568), Sundarpur (4,546), Paschim Rampur (4,099), Digha (6,171), Telia (8,259), Bhundar Kismat (5,800), Kochgiria (4,606), Habaspur (17,148) and Kasba Bahadurpur (7,470).

=== Literacy ===
As per the 2011 census, the total number of literate persons in Bhagawangola I CD block was 115,632 (66.79% of the population over 6 years) out of which males numbered 59,970 (67.64% of the male population over 6 years) and females numbered 55,662 (65.89% of the female population over 6 years). The gender disparity (the difference between female and male literacy rates) was 1.74%.

See also – List of West Bengal districts ranked by literacy rate

Literacy in CD blocks of
Murshidabad district
Jangipur subdivision
Farakka – 59.75%
Samserganj – 54.98%
Suti I – 58.40%
Suti II – 55.23%
Raghunathganj I – 64.49%
Raghunathganj II – 61.17%
Sagardighi – 65.27%
Lalbag subdivision
Murshidabad-Jiaganj – 69.14%
Bhagawangola I - 57.22%
Bhagawangola II – 53.48%
Lalgola– 64.32%
Nabagram – 70.83%
Sadar subdivision
Berhampore – 73.51%
Beldanga I – 70.06%
Beldanga II – 67.86%
Hariharpara – 69.20%
Naoda – 66.09%
Kandi subdivision
Kandi – 65.13%
Khargram – 63.56%
Burwan – 68.96%
Bharatpur I – 62.93%
Bharatpur II – 66.07%
Domkol subdivision
Domkal – 55.89%
Raninagar I – 57.81%
Raninagar II – 54.81%
Jalangi – 58.73%
Source: 2011 Census: CD Block Wise
Primary Census Abstract Data

=== Language and religion ===
Religion in Bhagawangola I CD block (2011)
Islam	85.67%
Hinduism	14.19%
Other or not stated	0.14%

In the 2011 census, Muslims numbered 173,117 and formed 85.67% of the population in Bhagawangola I CD block. Hindus numbered 28,672 and formed 14.19% of the population. Others numbered 282 and formed 0.14% of the population. In Bhagawangola I and Bhagabangola II CD blocks taken together, while the proportion of Muslims increased from 82.02% in 1991 to 85.02% in 2001, the proportion of Hindus declined from 17.98% in 1991 to 14.80% in 2001.

Murshidabad district had 4,707,573 Muslims who formed 66.27% of the population, 2,359,061 Hindus who formed 33.21% of the population, and 37, 173 persons belonging to other religions who formed 0.52% of the population, in the 2011 census. While the proportion of Muslim population in the district increased from 61.40% in 1991 to 63.67% in 2001, the proportion of Hindu population declined from 38.39% in 1991 to 35.92% in 2001.

Murshidabad was the only Muslim majority district in West Bengal at the time of partition of India in 1947. The proportion of Muslims in the population of Murshidabad district in 1951 was 55.24%. The Radcliffe Line had placed Muslim majority Murshidabad in India and the Hindu majority Khulna in Pakistan, in order to maintain the integrity of the Ganges river system In India.

Bengali is the predominant language, spoken by 99.62% of the population.

== Rural poverty ==
As per the Human Development Report 2004 for West Bengal, the rural poverty ratio in Murshidabad district was 46.12%. Purulia, Bankura and Birbhum districts had higher rural poverty ratios. These estimates were based on Central Sample data of NSS 55th round 1999-2000.

== Economy ==
=== Livelihood ===
In Bhagawangola I CD block in 2011, amongst the class of total workers, cultivators numbered 8,376 and formed 13.05%, agricultural labourers numbered 25,986 and formed 40.49%, household industry workers numbered 2,837 and formed 4.42% and other workers numbered 26,980 and formed 42.04%.

=== Infrastructure ===
There are 54 inhabited villages in Bhagawangola I CD block. 100% villages have power supply. 53 villages (98.15%) have drinking water supply. 13 villages (24.07%) have post offices. 53 villages (98.15%) have telephones (including landlines, public call offices and mobile phones). 33 villages (61.11%) have a pucca approach road and 22 villages (40.74%) have transport communication (includes bus service, rail facility and navigable waterways). 4 villages (7.41%) have agricultural credit societies and 6 villages (11.11%) have banks.

=== Agriculture ===
Persons engaged in agriculture
in Bhagawangola I CD block
1. Bargadars (2.93%)
2. Patta holders (7.49%)
3. Small farmers (5.14%)
4. Marginal farmers (26.5%)
5. Agricultural labourers (58.0%)

From 1977 onwards major land reforms took place in West Bengal. Land in excess of land ceiling was acquired and distributed amongst the peasants. Following land reforms land ownership pattern has undergone transformation. In 2013-14, persons engaged in agriculture in Bhagawangola I CD block could be classified as follows: bargadars 1,312 (2.93%), patta (document) holders 3,356 (7.49%), small farmers (possessing land between 1 and 2 hectares) 2,306 (5.14%), marginal farmers (possessing land up to 1 hectare) 11,866 (26.47%) and agricultural labourers 25,986 (57.97%).

Bhagawangola I CD Bblock had 130 fertiliser depots, 4 seed stores and 37 fair price shops in 2013-14.

In 2013-14, Bhagawangola I CD block produced 2,002 tonnes of Aman paddy, the main winter crop from 932 hectares, 2,654 tonnes of Boro paddy (spring crop) from 789 hectares, 143 tonnes of Aus paddy (summer crop) from 66 hectares, 902 tonnes of wheat from 421 hectares, 209 tonnes of maize from 81 hectares, 95,908 tonnes of jute from 6,101 hectares and 8,940 tonnes of potatoes from 298 hectares. It also produced pulses and oilseeds.

In 2013-14, the total area irrigated in Bhagawangola I CD block was 3,231 hectares, out of which 123 hectares were irrigated with river lift irrigation, 660 hectares by deep tube well, 48 hectares by shallow tube well and 2,400 hectares by other means.

=== Silk and handicrafts ===
Murshidabad is famous for its silk industry since the Middle Ages. There are three distinct categories in this industry, namely (i) Mulberry cultivation and silkworm rearing (ii) Peeling of raw silk (iii) Weaving of silk fabrics.

Ivory carving is an important cottage industry from the era of the Nawabs. The main areas where this industry has flourished are Khagra and Jiaganj. 99% of ivory craft production is exported. In more recent years sandalwood etching has become more popular than ivory carving. Bell metal and Brass utensils are manufactured in large quantities at Khagra, Berhampore, Kandi and Jangipur. Beedi making has flourished in the Jangipur subdivision.

=== Banking ===
In 2013-14, Bhagawangola I CD block had offices of 6 commercial banks and 2 gramin banks.

=== Backward Regions Grant Fund ===
Murshidabad district is listed as a backward region and receives financial support from the Backward Regions Grant Fund. The fund, created by the Government of India, is designed to redress regional imbalances in development. As of 2012, 272 districts across the country were listed under this scheme. The list includes 11 districts of West Bengal.

== Transport ==
Bhagawangola I CD block has 7 ferry services and 2 originating/ terminating bus routes.

Bhagwangola railway station and Subarnamrigi railway station are on the Ranaghat-Lalgola branch line which was opened in 1905.

State Highway 11A, running from Raghunathganj to Bhagawangola passes through this CD block.

== Education ==
In 2013-14, Bhagawangola I CD block had 82 primary schools with 10,279 students, 13 middle schools with 2,067 students, 2 high schools with 2,997 students and 8 higher secondary schools with 18,493 students. Bhagawangola I CD block had 366 institutions for special and non-formal education with 17,423 students.

In Bhagawangola I CD block, amongst the 54 inhabited villages, 5 villages did not have a school, 28 villages have more than 1 primary school, 23 villages have at least 1 primary and 1 middle school and 12 villages had at least 1 middle and 1 secondary school.

== Healthcare ==
In 2014, Bhagawangola I CD block had 1 block primary health centre, 2 primary health centres and 4 private nursing homes with total 42 beds and 7 doctors (excluding private bodies). It had 25 family welfare subcentres. 905 patients were treated indoor and 171,829 patients were treated outdoor in the hospitals, health centres and subcentres of the CD block.

Bhagawangola I CD block has Kanapukur Rural Hospital at Kismattatla (with 15 beds), Oper-Orahar Primary Health Centre at Sundarpur (with 2 beds) and Habaspur PHC (with 10 beds).

Bhagwangola I CD block is one of the areas of Murshidabad district where ground water is affected by a high level of arsenic contamination. The WHO guideline for arsenic in drinking water is 10 mg/ litre, and the Indian Standard value is 50 mg/ litre. All but one of the 26 blocks of Murshidabad district have arsenic contamination above the WHO level, all but two of the blocks have arsenic concentration above the Indian Standard value and 17 blocks have arsenic concentration above 300 mg/litre. The maximum concentration in Bhagawangola I CD block is 1,285 mg/litre.
