= Naldahari =

- Village
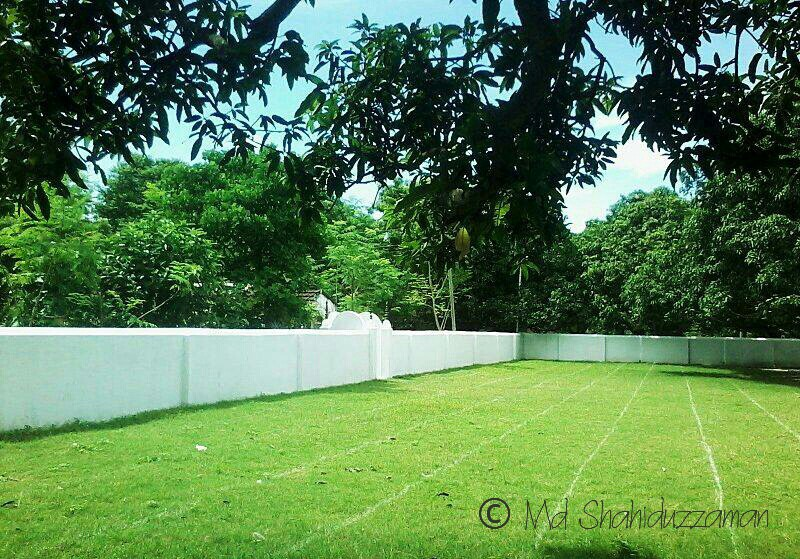
- Naldahari Eidgah

- Location in West Bengal, India Naldahari (India)
- Coordinates: 24.42°N 88.25°E
- Country: India
- State: West Bengal
- District: Murshidabad
- Subdivision: Lalbagh
- Block: Lalgola
- Gram Panchyat: Lalgola

Area
  - Total: 2.5 km^{2} (0.97 sq mi)
- Elevation: 22 m (72 ft)

Population (2011)
  - Total: 2,671

Languages
  - Official: Bengali, English
- Time zone: UTC+5:30 (IST)
- Postal code: 742148
- ISO 3166 code: IN-WB
- Sex ratio: 961 ♂/♀
- Lok Sabha: Jangipur
- Vidhan Sabha: Lalgola
- Website: murshidabad.nic.in

Naldahari is a small village located in the Murshidabad district of the state of West Bengal, India. It is a part of Lalgola Block near the Indo-Bangladesh international border. It is situated about 225 kilometres (140 miles) north of Kolkata, near the head of the Ganges delta.

== Demography ==
It is the part of Lalgola Gram Panchyat in rural area. Naldahari village has population of 2671 of which are 1362 males while are 1309 females as per Population Census 2011. In this village population of children with age 0-6 is 361 which makes up 13.53% of total population of village. Average Sex Ratio of this village is 961 which is higher than West Bengal state average of 950. Child Sex Ratio this village as per census is 963, higher than West Bengal average of 956. Naldahari village has lower literacy rate compared to West Bengal. In 2011, literacy rate of this village was 72.23% compared to 76.26% of West Bengal. In Naldahari Male literacy stands at 74.85% while female literacy rate was 69.51%.

== Geography ==
Naldahari is located at 24°25′12″N 88°15′53″E.

60% of the land is undeveloped and is used for cultivation, Typical crops are corn, wheat, mustard, jute and vegetables. 5% of the land is ponds used for fish production. The climate is similar to the rest of Gangetic West Bengal. The maximum temperature during the summer is about 45 °C (113 °F); the minimum during the winter is between 8 and 10 °C (46 and 50 °F).

== Communication ==
The village is situated near about 1 km away from Lalgola railway station and 2 km away from Lalgola Bus stand.

== Education ==
- Bairbona Primary School
- Naldahari Kodalkati Primary School.

There are also have some of High school and Madrasah within 2 km of this village. Lalgola College is only 3 km away from this village.

== Drinking water ==
The condition of the water of this village is not so pure. So the villagers use drinking water from a treated water project called Naldahari Swajaldhara Prokolpo.

== Religion and community ==
Most of the villagers are Muslim. There have an Eidgah (ইদগাহ) in this village. People also from neighboring villages and cities come to pray in this Eidgah in Eid days. There also have three Jame Masjid and some Waktia Masjid in this village.
