= Lalgola (community development block) =

- Community development block
- Interactive map of Lalgola
- Coordinates: 24.42°N 88.25°E
- Country: India
- State: West Bengal
- District: Murshidabad

Government
  - Type: Federal democracy

Area
  - Total: 134 km^{2} (52 sq mi)
- Elevation: 26 m (85 ft)

Population (2011)
  - Total: 335,831
  - Density: 2,510/km^{2} (6,490/sq mi)

Languages
  - Official: Bengali, English

Literacy
  - Literacy (2011): 64.32%
- Time zone: UTC+5:30 (IST)
- PIN: 742148 (Lalgola); 742185 (Krishnapur) 742151 (Sadar Nashipur)
- Telephone/STD code: 03482
- ISO 3166 code: IN-WB
- Vehicle registration: WB-57, WB-58
- Lok Sabha constituency: Jangipur
- Vidhan Sabha constituency: Lalgola, Raghunathganj
- Website: murshidabad.gov.in

Lalgola is a community development block that forms an administrative division in the Lalbag subdivision of Murshidabad district in the Indian state of West Bengal.

== Geography ==
Lalgola is located at 24°25′N 88°15′E

Lalgola CD block is bounded by Chapai Nawabganj Sadar Upazila in Chapai Nawabganj District and Godagari Upazila in Rajshahi District of Bangladesh, across the Padma, in the north, Bhagawangola II CD block in the east, Bhagawangola I CD block in the south and Raghunathganj I and Raghunathganj II CD blocks in the west.

Lalgola CD block lies in the Jalangi-Bhagirathi Interfluve physiographic region in Murshidabad district. The Bhagirathi River splits the district into two natural physiographic regions – Rarh on the west and Bagri on the east. The Padma River separates Murshidabad district from Malda district and Chapai Nawabganj and Rajshahi districts of Bangladesh in the north. It is a low-lying area having alluvial soil pattern.

The Bagri or the eastern part of the district is a low lying alluvial plain with the shape of an isosceles triangle. The Ganges/Padma and the Bhagirathi form the two equal sides; the Jalangi forms the entire base; other offshoots of the Ganga meander within the area. It is liable to flooding by the spill of the Bhagirathi and other rivers. The main rivers of this region are Bhairab, Jalangi, Chhoto Bhairab, Sialmari and Gobra Nala. All these rivers are distributaries of the main branch of the Ganges. The rivers are in their decaying stages.

A major problem in Murshidabad district is river bank erosion. As of 2013, an estimated 2.4 million people reside along the banks of the Ganges alone in Murshidabad district. Between 1931 and 1977, 26,769 hectares have been eroded and many villages have been fully submerged. 1980-1990 was a decade of erosion for this district and during the decade Giria, Sekhalipur, Khejustala, Mithipur, Fajilpur, Rajapur, Akheriganj, Parashpur villages were badly affected. Many families living along the Ganges continue to be affected. As for example, in 2007, severe erosion occurred in Lalgola, Bhagawangola II, Farakka and Raninnagar II CD blocks. In 2008, 1,245 families were affected in Lalgola, Bhagawangola I and Bhagawangola II CD blocks.

See also - River bank erosion along the Ganges in Malda and Murshidabad districts

Lalgola is a border checkpoint on the Bangladesh-India border. On the other side is Godagiri, across the Padma.

Murshidabad district has a 125.35 km long international border with Bangladesh of which 42.35 km is on land and the remaining is riverine. There are 9 blocks – Samserganj, Suti I, Suti II, Raghunathganj II, Lalgola, Bhagawangola I, Bhagawangola II, Raninagar II and Jalangi - along the Bangladesh-India border.

Lalgola CD block has an area of 184.37 km^{2}. It has 1 panchayat samity, 12 gram panchayats, 205 gram sansads (village councils), 94 mouzas and 84 inhabited villages. Lalgola police station serves this block. Headquarters of this CD block is at Lalgola.

Gram panchayats in Lalgola block/ panchayat samiti are: Airmari Krishnapur, Bahadurpur, Bilborakopra, Dewansarai, Jasaitala, Kalmegha, Lalgola, Maiya, Manikchak, Nashipur, Paikpara and Ramchandrapur.

== Demographics ==
=== Population ===
According to the 2011 Census of India, Lalgola CD block had a total population of 335,831, all of which were rural. There were 170,997 (51%) males and 164,834 (49%) females. Population in the age range 0–6 years numbered 54,961. Scheduled Castes numbered 31,248 (9.30%) and Scheduled Tribes numbered 168 (0.05%).

As per 2001 census, Lalgola block has a total population of 267,593, out of which 136,853 were males and 130,710 were females. Lalgola block registered a population growth of 29.40 per cent during the 1991-2001 decade. Decadal growth for the district was 23.70 per cent. Decadal growth in West Bengal was 17.84 per cent.

Decadal Population Growth Rate (%)

- Lalgola CD block
- Murshidabad district
- West Bengal

The decadal growth of population in Lalgola CD block in 2001-2011 was 25.48%.

The decadal growth rate of population in Murshidabad district was as follows: 33.5% in 1951–61, 28.6% in 1961–71, 25.5% in 1971–81, 28.2% in 1981-91, 23.8% in 1991-2001 and 21.1% in 2001-11. The decadal growth rate for West Bengal in 2001-11 was 13.93%.

The decadal growth rate of population in Chapai Nawabganj District was 15.59% for the decade 2001–2011, down from 21.67% in the decade 1991-2001. The decadal growth rate of population in Rajshahi District was 13.48% for the decade 2001–2011, down from 21.19% in the decade 1991-2001. Both the districts are across the Ganges, in Bangladesh.

There are reports of Bangladeshi infiltrators entering Murshidabad district.

=== Villages ===
Large villages under Lalgola CD block were (2011 population figures in brackets): Moya(15,131), Bayra (15,259), Paharpur (13,368), Amarkunda (5,605), Makimnagar (4,057), Ilimpur (6,204), Nasipur (8,696), Syampur (4,443), Rajarampur (10,528), Paikpara (12,138), Nadaipur (9,401), Basui (4,676), Upar Fatepur (7,142), Krishnapur (19,462), Ramchandrapur (4,358), Karttickpur (5,687), Kalmegha (8,176), Bansgara (8,671), Lalgola (31,698), Hazi Mahammadpur (4,227), Paschim Durbarpara (5,056), Krishnapur Dinurpara (7,502), Brahimottar Manick Chak (7,800), Bajupur Madhupur (9,771), Diar Fatepur (10,536) and Sites Nagar (7,123).

=== Literacy ===
As per the 2011 census, the total number of literate persons in Lalgola CD block was 180,646 (64.32% of the population over 6 years) out of which males numbered 94,242 (65.81% of the male population over 6 years) and females numbered 86,401 (62.76% of the female population over 6 years). The gender disparity (the difference between female and male literacy rates) was 3.06%.

See also – List of West Bengal districts ranked by literacy rate

Literacy in CD blocks of
Murshidabad district
Jangipur subdivision
Farakka – 59.75%
Samserganj – 54.98%
Suti I – 58.40%
Suti II – 55.23%
Raghunathganj I – 64.49%
Raghunathganj II – 61.17%
Sagardighi – 65.27%
Lalbag subdivision
Murshidabad-Jiaganj – 69.14%
Bhagawangola I - 57.22%
Bhagawangola II – 53.48%
Lalgola– 64.32%
Nabagram – 70.83%
Sadar subdivision
Berhampore – 73.51%
Beldanga I – 70.06%
Beldanga II – 67.86%
Hariharpara – 69.20%
Naoda – 66.09%
Kandi subdivision
Kandi – 65.13%
Khargram – 63.56%
Burwan – 68.96%
Bharatpur I – 62.93%
Bharatpur II – 66.07%
Domkol subdivision
Domkal – 55.89%
Raninagar I – 57.81%
Raninagar II – 54.81%
Jalangi – 58.73%
Source: 2011 Census: CD Block Wise
Primary Census Abstract Data

=== Language and religion ===
Religion in Lalgola CD block (2011)
Islam	80.25%
Hinduism	19.50%
Other or not stated	0.25%

In the 2011 census, Muslims numbered 269,500 and formed 80.25% of the population in Lalgola CD block. Hindus numbered 65,493 and formed 19.50% of the population. Others numbered 838 and formed 0.25% of the population. In Lalgola CD block while the proportion of Muslims increased from 75.74% in 1991 to 77.93% in 2001, the proportion of Hindus declined from 24.13% in 1991 to 21.81% in 2001.

Murshidabad district had 4,707,573 Muslims who formed 66.27% of the population, 2,359,061 Hindus who formed 33.21% of the population, and 37, 173 persons belonging to other religions who formed 0.52% of the population, in the 2011 census. While the proportion of Muslim population in the district increased from 61.40% in 1991 to 63.67% in 2001, the proportion of Hindu population declined from 38.39% in 1991 to 35.92% in 2001.

Murshidabad was the only Muslim majority district in West Bengal at the time of partition of India in 1947. The proportion of Muslims in the population of Murshidabad district in 1951 was 55.24%. The Radcliffe Line had placed Muslim majority Murshidabad in India and the Hindu majority Khulna in Pakistan, in order to maintain the integrity of the Ganges river system In India.

Languages of Lalgola CD block (2011)
1. Bengali (97.8%)
2. Savara (1.95%)
3. Others (0.29%)

At the time of the 2011 census, 97.76% of the population spoke Bengali and 1.95% Savara as their first language.

== Rural poverty ==
As per the Human Development Report 2004 for West Bengal, the rural poverty ratio in Murshidabad district was 46.12%. Purulia, Bankura and Birbhum districts had higher rural poverty ratios. These estimates were based on Central Sample data of NSS 55th round 1999-2000.

== Economy ==
=== Livelihood ===
In Lalgola CD block in 2011, amongst the class of total workers, cultivators numbered 10,746 and formed 9.18%, agricultural labourers numbered 32,568 and formed 27.83%, household industry workers numbered 18,139 and formed 15.50% and other workers numbered 55,565 and formed 47.48%.

=== Infrastructure ===
There are 84 inhabited villages in Lalgola CD block. 100% villages have power supply. 83 villages (98.81%) have drinking water supply. 17 villages (20.24%) have post offices. 83 villages (98.81%) have telephones (including landlines, public call offices and mobile phones). 38 villages (45.24%) have a pucca approach road and 17 villages (20.24%) have transport communication (includes bus service, rail facility and navigable waterways). 4 villages (4.76%) have agricultural credit societies and 6 villages (7.14%) have banks.

=== Agriculture ===
Persons engaged in agriculture
in Lalgola CD block
1. Bargadars (2.66%)
2. Patta holders (7.62%)
3. Small farmers (6.38%)
4. Marginal farmers (33.4%)
5. Agricultural labourers (49.9%)

From 1977 onwards major land reforms took place in West Bengal. Land in excess of land ceiling was acquired and distributed amongst the peasants. Following land reforms land ownership pattern has undergone transformation. In 2013–14, persons engaged in agriculture in Lalgola CD block could be classified as follows: bargadars 1,736 (2.66%), patta (document) holders 4,974 (7.62%), small farmers (possessing land between 1 and 2 hectares) 4,166 (6.38%), marginal farmers (possessing land up to 1 hectare) 21,812 (33.43%) and agricultural labourers 32,568 (49.91%).

Lalgola CD block had 170 fertiliser depots, 3 seed stores and 55 fair price shops in 2013-14.

In 2013–14, Lalgola CD block produced 7,057 tonnes of Aman paddy, the main winter crop from 2,594 hectares, 2,630 tonnes of Boro paddy (spring crop) from 751 hectares, 1,216 tonnes of Aus paddy (summer crop) from 649 hectares, 9,870 tonnes of wheat from 3,751 hectares, 227 tonnes of maize from 88 hectares, 134,085 tonnes of jute from 9,881 hectares and 4,176 tonnes of potatoes from 145 hectares. It also produced pulses and oilseeds.

In 2013–14, the total area irrigated in Lalgola CD block was 7,422 hectares, out of which 90 hectares were irrigated by canal water, 120 hectares with tank water, 186 hectares with river lift irrigation, 1,698 hectares by deep tube well, 68 hectares by shallow tube well and 5,260 hectares by other means.

=== Silk and handicrafts ===
Murshidabad is famous for its silk industry since the Middle Ages. There are three distinct categories in this industry, namely (i) Mulberry cultivation and silkworm rearing (ii) Peeling of raw silk (iii) Weaving of silk fabrics.

Ivory carving is an important cottage industry from the era of the Nawabs. The main areas where this industry has flourished are Khagra and Jiaganj. 99% of ivory craft production is exported. In more recent years sandalwood etching has become more popular than ivory carving. Bell metal and Brass utensils are manufactured in large quantities at Khagra, Berhampore, Kandi and Jangipur. Beedi making has flourished in the Jangipur subdivision.

=== Banking ===
In 2013–14, Lalgola CD block had offices of 11 commercial banks and 2 gramin banks.

=== Backward Regions Grant Fund ===
Murshidabad district is listed as a backward region and receives financial support from the Backward Regions Grant Fund. The fund, created by the Government of India, is designed to redress regional imbalances in development. As of 2012, 272 districts across the country were listed under this scheme. The list includes 11 districts of West Bengal.

== Transport ==
Lalgola CD block has 6 ferry services and 6 originating/ terminating bus routes.

The Ranaghat-Lalgola branch line was opened in 1905.

State Highway 11A, running from Raghunathganj to Bhagawangola passes through this CD block.

== Education ==
In 2013–14, Lalgola CD block had 131 primary schools with 20,768 students, 22 middle schools with 3,260 students, 2 high schools with 2,105 students and 16 higher secondary schools with 35,783 students. Lalgola CD block had 1 general college with 1,890 students and 486 institutions for special and non-formal education with 28,338 students.

Lalgola College was established in 2006 at Lalgola

In Lalgola CD block, amongst the 84 inhabited villages, 13 villages did not have a school, 35 villages have more than 1 primary school, 35 villages have at least 1 primary and 1 middle school and 14 villages have at least 1 middle and 1 secondary school.

== Healthcare ==
In 2014, Lalgola CD block had 1 rural hospital, 2 primary health centres and 3 private nursing homes with total 64 beds and 9 doctors (excluding private bodies). It had 34 family welfare subcentres. 20,314 patients were treated indoor and 144,875 patients were treated outdoor in the hospitals, health centres and subcentres of the CD Block.

Lalgola CD block has Krishnapur Rural Hospital at Krishnapur (with 50 beds), Rajarampur Primary Health Centre (with 4 beds) and Krishnapur-Dinupara PHC (with 10 beds).

Lalgola CD block is one of the areas of Murshidabad district where ground water is affected by a high level of arsenic contamination. The WHO guideline for arsenic in drinking water is 10 mg/ litre, and the Indian Standard value is 50 mg/ litre. All but one of the 26 blocks of Murshidabad district have arsenic contamination above the WHO level, all but two of the blocks have arsenic concentration above the Indian Standard value and 17 blocks have arsenic concentration above 300 mg/litre. The maximum concentration in Lalgola CD block is 1,028 mg/litre.
