= Islampur, Murshidabad =

Islampur
- Census Town
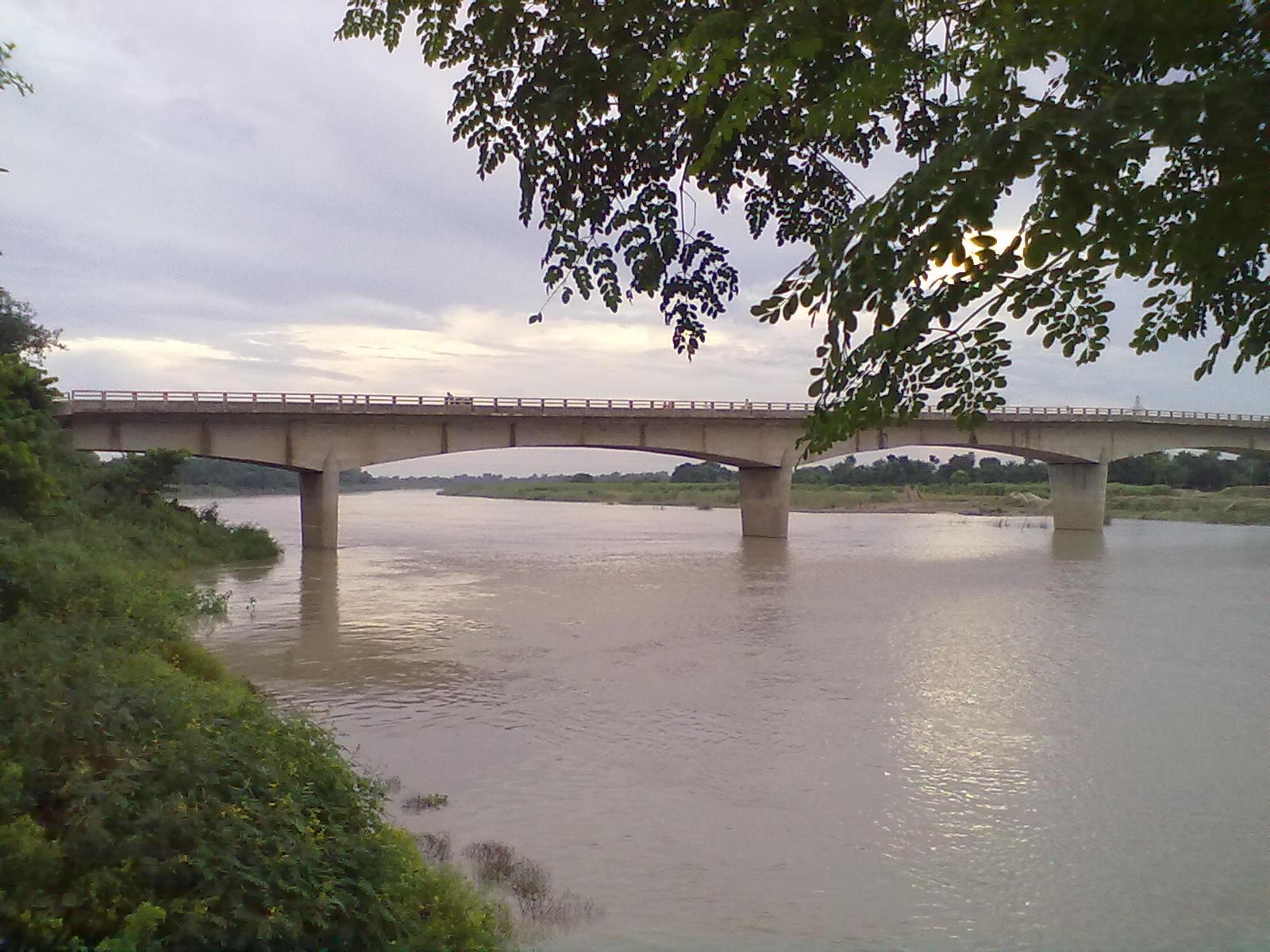
- Bhairab Bridge at Islampur

- Location in West Bengal, India Islampur (India)
- Coordinates: 24.15483°N 88.46651°E
- Country: India
- State: West Bengal
- District: Murshidabad

Area
  - Total: 4.0919 km^{2} (1.5799 sq mi)

Population (2011)
  - Total: 15,019
  - Density: 3,670.4/km^{2} (9,506.3/sq mi)

Languages
  - Official: Bengali, English
- Time zone: UTC+5:30 (IST)
- Vehicle registration: WB
- Lok Sabha constituency: Murshidabad
- Vidhan Sabha constituency: Raninagar
- Website: murshidabad.nic.in

Islampur is a census town in the Raninagar I CD block in the Murshidabad district in the state of West Bengal, India

== Etymology ==
Islampur is named after Islam Khan, Dewan of the then Nawab, who tented in Goas which is situated 2 kilometers away from the town in 1717.

== Geography ==
Cities, towns and locations in the Lalbag and Domkal subdivisions, Murshidabad district
M: municipal town, CT: census town, R: rural/ urban centre, H: historical place
Owing to space constraints in the small map, the actual locations in a larger map may vary slightly

=== Location ===
Islampur is located at 24.15483°N 88.46651°E.

The town is situated on the bank of river Bhairab. The entry to the town from Berhampur is across the Bhairab Bridge. It is situated 25 km from the district town Berhampur, on the State Highway of Berhampur-Domkal-Jalangi and Berhampur-Islampur-Seikhpara-Sagarpara. A little football ground is situated at the heart of Islampur called Netaji Park Playground just 2 minutes walking distance from the Islampur Bus stand towards north.

=== Area overview ===
While the Lalbag subdivision is spread across both the natural physiographic regions of the district, Rarh and Bagri, the Domkal subdivision occupies the north-eastern corner of Bagri. In the map alongside, the Ganges/ Padma River flows along the northern portion. The border with Bangladesh can be seen in the north and the east. Murshidabad district shares with Bangladesh a porous international border which is notoriously crime prone (partly shown in this map). The Ganges has a tendency to change course frequently, causing severe erosion, mostly along the southern bank. The historic city of Murshidabad, a centre of major tourist attraction, is located in this area. In 1717, when Murshid Quli Khan became Subahdar, he made Murshidabad the capital of Subah Bangla (then Bengal, Bihar and Odisha). The entire area is overwhelmingly rural with over 90% of the population living in the rural areas.

Note: The map alongside presents some of the notable locations in the subdivisions. All places marked in the map are linked in the larger full screen map.

== Civic administration ==
=== Police station ===
Islampur police station has jurisdiction over Raninagar I CD block.

== Demographics ==
According to the 2011 Census of India, Islampur had a total population of 15,019, of which 7,655 (51%) were males and 7,364 (49%) were females. Population in the age range 0–6 years was 1,599. The total number of literate persons in Islampur was 10,664 (79.23% of the population over 6 years).

== Infrastructure ==
According to the District Census Handbook, Murshidabad, 2011, Islampur covered an area of 4.0919 km^{2}. The protected water-supply involved pressure tank, tap water from treated source. It had 1,445 domestic electric connections. xAmong the medical facilities it had 1 hospital, 3 dispensaries/ health centres, 2 nursing homes, 1 veterinary hospital. Among the educational facilities, it had 8 primary schools, 1 middle school, 1 secondary school in town, general degree college at Domkal 12 km away. It had 1 recognised shorthand, typewriting & vocational training institute, 3 non-formal education centres (Sarva Shiksha Abhiyan). Among the social, recreational & cultural facilities it had 1 auditorium/ community hall, 1 public library, 1 reading room. It had branch offices of 1 nationalised bank, 1 private commercial bank, 1 cooperative bank.

== Transport ==
Road - The town is well connected by road with other parts of the districts. Bus service to Baharampur is available frequently. There is direct bus service to Kolkata 3 times a day. Direct bus to Malda and Coochbehar is also available. Traker service is also available. To get around within the town cycle rickshaw is the only thing available.

Rail - The town is currently not connected to railway network. However, a proposal is there to connect the town through rail network to Krishnanagar and Baharampur.

== Attractions ==
The River Bhairab can be viewed from the town. There is old 'Jamidar' Bari in Islampur. The past "zamindari" system is there with few parts remaining. There are Chak, a type of old Bengal city building, with narrow lanes, old houses, and a large number of handlooms, weaving khadi and silks.

== Entertainment ==
The entertainment quotient here is very less. Only one theatre named Rupali Talkies is running here. Very few sports grounds are here and no park. A park along the bank of the river Bhairab.

== Education ==
The town has a heritage school named Chak Islampur S.C.M. High School, which was established as early as 1878. Presently Islampur has one general degree college, one coeducational high school, two girls' high schools and one Madrasa, as well as several private nursery schools and government primary schools.

Murshidabad Adarsha Mahavidyalaya was established in 1981 at Islampur. Affiliated with the University of Kalyani, it offers honours courses in Bengali, English, history, philosophy and political science.

== Healthcare ==
Islampur Rural Hospital, with 30 beds, is the major government medical facility in Raninagar I CD block.

See also - Healthcare in West Bengal

== See also ==
- River bank erosion along the Ganges in Malda and Murshidabad districts
