= Kasbagoas =

- Village
- Location in West Bengal, India Kasbagoas (India)
- Coordinates: 24.171994°N 88.499975°E
- Country: India
- State: West Bengal
- District: Murshidabad

Population (2011)
  - Total: 5,766

Languages
  - Official: Bengali, English
- Time zone: UTC+5:30 (IST)
- Lok Sabha constituency: Murshidabad
- Vidhan Sabha constituency: Raninagar
- Website: murshidabad.gov.in

Kasbagoas is a village in the Raninagar I CD block in the Domkol subdivision of Murshidabad district in the state of West Bengal, India.

== Geography ==
Cities, towns and locations in the Lalbag and Domkal subdivisions, Murshidabad district
M: municipal town, CT: census town, R: rural/ urban centre, H: historical place
Owing to space constraints in the small map, the actual locations in a larger map may vary slightly

=== Location ===
Kasbagoas is located at 24°10′19″N 88°30′00″E.

=== Area overview ===
While the Lalbag subdivision is spread across both the natural physiographic regions of the district, Rarh and Bagri, the Domkal subdivision occupies the north-eastern corner of Bagri. In the map alongside, the Ganges/ Padma River flows along the northern portion. The border with Bangladesh can be seen in the north and the east. Murshidabad district shares with Bangladesh a porous international border which is notoriously crime prone (partly shown in this map). The Ganges has a tendency to change course frequently, causing severe erosion, mostly along the southern bank. The historic city of Murshidabad, a centre of major tourist attraction, is located in this area. In 1717, when Murshid Quli Khan became Subahdar, he made Murshidabad the capital of Subah Bangla (then Bengal, Bihar and Odisha). The entire area is overwhelmingly rural with over 90% of the population living in the rural areas.

Note: The map alongside presents some of the notable locations in the subdivisions. All places marked in the map are linked in the larger full screen map.

== Demographics ==
According to the 2011 Census of India, Kasbagoas had a total population of 5,766, of which 2,906 (50%) were males and 2,860 (50%) were females. Population in the age range 0–6 years was 769. The total number of literate persons in Kasbagoas was 2,980 (59.64% of the population over 6 years).

== Civic administration ==
=== CD block HQ ===
The headquarters of the Raninagar I CD block are located at Kasbagoas.

== Transport ==
The Islampur-Sheikhpara Road links Kasbagoas to State Highway 11.

== See also ==
- River bank erosion along the Ganges in Malda and Murshidabad districts
