= Bhagawangola II =

Bhagawangola II Bhagabangola II
- Community development block
- Interactive map of Bhagawangola II
- Coordinates: 24.309°N 88.358°E
- Country: India
- State: West Bengal
- District: Murshidabad

Government
  - Type: Federal democracy

Area
  - Total: 149.59 km^{2} (57.76 sq mi)
- Elevation: 24 m (79 ft)

Population (2011)
  - Total: 158,024
  - Density: 1,056.4/km^{2} (2,736.0/sq mi)

Languages
  - Official: Bengali, English

Literacy
  - Literacy (2011): 53.58%
- Time zone: UTC+5:30 (IST)
- PIN: 742135 (Bhagwangola)
- Telephone/STD code: 03482
- ISO 3166 code: IN-WB
- Vehicle registration: WB-57, WB-58
- Lok Sabha constituency: Murshidabad
- Vidhan Sabha constituency: Bhagabangola
- Website: murshidabad.gov.in

Bhagawangola II is a community development block that forms an administrative division in the Lalbag subdivision of Murshidabad district in the Indian state of West Bengal.

== Geography ==
Nashipur is located at 24°18′32″N 88°21′29″E

Bhagawangola II CD block lies in the Jalangi-Bhagirathi Interfluve physiographic region in Murshidabad district. The Bhagirathi River splits the district into two natural physiographic regions – Rarh on the west and Bagri on the east. The Padma River separates Murshidabad district from Malda district and Chapai Nawabganj and Rajshahi districts of Bangladesh in the north. It is a low-lying area having alluvial soil pattern.

Bhagawangola II CD block is bounded by Godagari and Paba upazilas in Rajshahi District of Bangladesh, across the Padma, in the north, Raninagar II CD block in the east, Murshidabad-Jiaganj and Raninagar I CD blocks in the south and Bhagawangola I CD block in the west.

Murshidabad district has a 125.35 km long international border with Bangladesh of which 42.35 km is on land and the remaining is riverine. There are 9 blocks – Samserganj, Suti I, Suti II, Raghunathganj II, Lalgola, Bhagawangola I, Bhagawangola II, Raninagar II and Jalangi - along the Bangladesh-India border.

The Bagri or the eastern part of the district is a low lying alluvial plain with the shape of an isosceles triangle. The Ganges/Padma and the Bhagirathi form the two equal sides; the Jalangi forms the entire base; other offshoots of the Ganges meander within the area. It is vulnerable to flooding by the Bhagirathi and other rivers. The main rivers of this region are Bhairab, Jalangi, Chhoto Bhairab, Sialmari and Gobra Nala. All these rivers are distributaries of the main branch of the Ganges. The rivers are in their decaying stages.

A major problem is river bank erosion. As of 2013, an estimated 2.4 million people resided along the banks of the Ganges alone in Murshidabad district. Between 1931 and 1977, 26,769 hectares have been eroded and many villages have been fully submerged. 1980-1990 was a decade of erosion for this district and during the decade Giria, Sekhalipur, Khejustala, Mithipur, Fajilpur, Rajapur, Akheriganj, Parashpur villages were badly affected. Many families living along the Ganges continue to be affected. As for example, in 2007, severe erosion occurred in Lalgola, Bhagawangola II, Farakka and Raninnagar II CD blocks. In 2008, 1,245 families were affected in Lalgola, Bhagawangola I and Bhagawangola II CD blocks.

Bhagawangola II CD block has an area of 175.26 km^{2}. It has 1 panchayat samity, 6 gram panchayats, 96 gram sansads (village councils), 71 mouzas and 56 inhabited villages. Ranitala police station serves this block. Headquarters of this CD block is at Nasipur.

Gram panchayats in Bhagawangola II block/ panchayat samiti are: Akheriganj, Amdahara, Baligram, Karibona, Nashipore and Saralpore.

=== Nirmal Char ===
Nirmal Char is an island created by deposition of silt in the Padma River, south of the international India-Bangladesh border. The Akheriganj area with a population of 20,000 living in an area of 50 square miles eroded the Padma River and that led to the natural formation of Nirmal Char.

== Demographics ==
=== Population ===
According to the 2011 Census of India, Bhagawangola II CD block had a total population of 158,024, all of which were rural. There were 80,699 (51%) males and 77,325 (49%) females. Population in the age range 0–6 years totalled 23,473. Scheduled Castes numbered 5,218 (3.30%) and Scheduled Tribes numbered 45 (0.03%).

As per 2001 census, Bhagawangola II block has a total population of 129,907, out of which 66,813 were males and 63,094 were females. Bhagawangola II block registered a population growth of 17.83 per cent during the 1991-2001 decade. Decadal growth for the district was 23.70 per cent. Decadal growth in West Bengal was 17.84 per cent.

Decadal Population Growth Rate (%)

- Bhagawagola II CD block
- Murshidabad district
- West Bengal

The decadal growth of population in Bhagawangola II CD block in 2001-2011 was 21.65%.

The decadal growth rate of population in Murshidabad district was as follows: 33.5% in 1951-61, 28.6% in 1961-71, 25.5% in 1971-81, 28.2% in 1981-91, 23.8% in 1991-2001 and 21.1% in 2001-11. The decadal growth rate for West Bengal in 2001-11 was 13.93%.

The decadal growth rate of population in neighbouring Rajshahi District, across the Ganges, in Bangladesh, was 13.48% for the decade 2001-2011, down from 21.19% in the decade 1991-2001.

There are reports of Bangladeshi infiltrators entering Murshidabad district.

=== Villages ===
Large villages in Bhagwangola II CD block were (2011 population figures in brackets): Amdahara Haziganj (4,281), Nasipur (25,644), Khamar Diar (8,385), Sankarpur (4,346), Khagjana (6,232), Kolan Radhakantapur (6,435), Bhandara (5,747), Benipur (5,167), Pukhuria (5,904) and Dakshin Sahar (7,849).

=== Literacy ===
As per the 2011 census, the total number of literate persons in Bhagawangola II CD block was 84,519 (62.82% of the population over 6 years) out of which males numbered 43,035 (62.58% of the male population over 6 years) and females numbered 41,484 (63.06% of the female population over 6 years). The gender disparity (the difference between female and male literacy rates) was -0.49%.

See also – List of West Bengal districts ranked by literacy rate

Literacy in CD blocks of
Murshidabad district
Jangipur subdivision
Farakka – 59.75%
Samserganj – 54.98%
Suti I – 58.40%
Suti II – 55.23%
Raghunathganj I – 64.49%
Raghunathganj II – 61.17%
Sagardighi – 65.27%
Lalbag subdivision
Murshidabad-Jiaganj – 69.14%
Bhagawangola I - 57.22%
Bhagawangola II – 53.48%
Lalgola– 64.32%
Nabagram – 70.83%
Sadar subdivision
Berhampore – 73.51%
Beldanga I – 70.06%
Beldanga II – 67.86%
Hariharpara – 69.20%
Naoda – 66.09%
Kandi subdivision
Kandi – 65.13%
Khargram – 63.56%
Burwan – 68.96%
Bharatpur I – 62.93%
Bharatpur II – 66.07%
Domkol subdivision
Domkal – 55.89%
Raninagar I – 57.81%
Raninagar II – 54.81%
Jalangi – 58.73%
Source: 2011 Census: CD Block Wise
Primary Census Abstract Data

=== Language and religion ===
Religion in Bhagawangola II CD block (2011)
Islam	89.43%
Hinduism	10.48%
Other or not stated	0.09%

In the 2011 census, Muslims numbered 141,317 and formed 89.43% of the population in Bhagawangola II CD block. Hindus numbered 16,566 and formed 10.48% of the population. Others numbered 141 and formed 0.09% of the population. In Bhagawangola I and Bhagabangola II CD blocks taken together, while the proportion of Muslims increased from 82.02% in 1991 to 85.02% in 2001, the proportion of Hindus declined from 17.98% in 1991 to 14.80% in 2001.

Murshidabad district had 4,707,573 Muslims who formed 66.27% of the population, 2,359,061 Hindus who formed 33.21% of the population, and 37, 173 persons belonging to other religions who formed 0.52% of the population, in the 2011 census. While the proportion of Muslim population in the district increased from 61.40% in 1991 to 63.67% in 2001, the proportion of Hindu population declined from 38.39% in 1991 to 35.92% in 2001.

Bengali is the predominant language, spoken by 99.96% of the population.

== Rural poverty ==
As per the Human Development Report 2004 for West Bengal, the rural poverty ratio in Murshidabad district was 46.12%. Purulia, Bankura and Birbhum districts had higher rural poverty ratios. These estimates were based on Central Sample data of NSS 55th round 1999-2000.

== Economy ==
=== Livelihood ===
In Bhagawangola II CD block in 2011, amongst the class of total workers, cultivators numbered 8,155 and formed 16.83%, agricultural labourers numbered 31,073 and formed 64.12%, household industry workers numbered 1,003 and formed 2.07% and other workers numbered 8,233 and formed 16.99%.

=== Infrastructure ===
There are 56 inhabited villages in Bhagawangola II CD block. 100% villages have power supply. 55 villages (98.21%) have drinking water supply. 10 villages (17.86%) have post offices. 54 villages (96.43%) have telephones (including landlines, public call offices and mobile phones). 24 villages (45.64%) have a pucca approach road and 16 villages (28.57%) have transport communication (includes bus service, rail facility and navigable waterways). 5 villages (8.93%) have agricultural credit societies and 8 villages (14.29%) have banks.

=== Agriculture ===
Persons engaged in agriculture
in Bhagawangola II CD block
1. Bargadars (1.52%)
2. Patta holders (11.0%)
3. Small farmers (5.44%)
4. Marginal farmers (24.3%)
5. Agricultural labourers (57.7%)

From 1977 onwards major land reforms took place in West Bengal. Land in excess of land ceiling was acquired and distributed amongst the peasants. Following land reforms land ownership pattern has undergone transformation. In 2013-14, persons engaged in agriculture in Bhagawangola II CD block could be classified as follows: bargadars 818 (1.52%), patta (document) holders 5,905 (10.97%), small farmers (possessing land between 1 and 2 hectares) 2,927 (5.44%), marginal farmers (possessing land up to 1 hectare) 13,092 (24.33%) and agricultural labourers 31,073 (57.74%).

Bhagawangola II CD block had 110 fertiliser depots, 1 seed store and 33 fair price shops in 2013-14.

In 2013-14, Bhagawangola II CD block produced 1,099 tonnes of Aman paddy, the main winter crop from 473 hectares, 5,005 tonnes of Boro paddy (spring crop) from 726 hectares, 700 tonnes of Aus paddy (summer crop) from 417 hectares, 322 tonnes of wheat from 147 hectares, 5 tonnes of maize from 2 hectares, 90,697 tonnes of jute from 5,554 hectares and 7,303 tonnes of potatoes from 261 hectares. It also produced pulses and oilseeds.

In 2013-14, the total area irrigated in Bhagawangola II CD block was 10,280 hectares, out of which 3 hectares were irrigated with tank water, 47 hectares with river lift irrigation, 280 hectares by deep tube well and 9,950 hectares by other means.

=== Silk and handicrafts ===
Murshidabad is famous for its silk industry since the Middle Ages. There are three distinct categories in this industry, namely (i) Mulberry cultivation and silkworm rearing (ii) Peeling of raw silk (iii) Weaving of silk fabrics.

Ivory carving is an important cottage industry from the era of the Nawabs. The main areas where this industry has flourished are Khagra and Jiaganj. 99% of ivory craft production is exported. In more recent years sandalwood etching has become more popular than ivory carving. Bell metal and Brass utensils are manufactured in large quantities at Khagra, Berhampore, Kandi and Jangipur. Beedi making has flourished in the Jangipur subdivision.

=== Banking ===
In 2013-14, Bhagawangola II CD block had offices of 6 commercial banks and 1 gramin bank.

=== Backward Regions Grant Fund ===
Murshidabad district is listed as a backward region and receives financial support from the Backward Regions Grant Fund. The fund, created by the Government of India, is designed to redress regional imbalances in development. As of 2012, 272 districts across the country were listed under this scheme. The list includes 11 districts of West Bengal.

== Transport ==
Bhagawangola II CD block has 3 ferry services and 3 originating/ terminating bus routes. The nearest Bhagwangola railway station is 12 km from CD Block headquarters.

== Education ==
In 2013-14, Bhagawangola II CD block had 74 primary schools with 9,431 students, 13 middle schools with 1,747 students, 4 high schools with 3,942 students and 6 higher secondary schools with 12,751 students. Bhagawangola II CD block had 318 institutions for special and non-formal education with 14,821 students.

In Bhagawangola II CD block, amongst the 56 inhabited villages, 2 villages did not have a school, 25 villages have more than 1 primary school, 21 villages have at least 1 primary and 1 middle school and 13 villages had at least 1 middle and 1 secondary school.

== Healthcare ==
In 2014, Bhagawangola II CD block had 1 block primary health centre and 2 primary health centres with total 29 beds and 4 doctors (excluding private bodies). It had 21 family welfare subcentres. 19,541 patients were treated indoor and 141,377 patients were treated outdoor in the hospitals, health centres and subcentres of the CD Block.

Bhagawangola II CD block has Nasipur Block Primary Health Centre at Nasipur (with 15 beds), Fulpur Primary Health Centre (with 4 beds) and Kolan-Radhakantapur PHC (with 10 beds).

Bhagwangola II CD block is one of the areas of Murshidabad district where ground water is affected by a high level of arsenic contamination. The WHO guideline for arsenic in drinking water is 10 mg/ litre, and the Indian Standard value is 50 mg/ litre. All but one of the 26 blocks of Murshidabad district have arsenic contamination above the WHO level, all but two of the blocks have arsenic concentration above the Indian Standard value and 17 blocks have arsenic concentration above 300 mg/litre. The maximum concentration in Bhagawangola II CD block is 1,852 mg/litre.
