= Nirmal Char =

- River Island
- Location in West Bengal, India
- Coordinates: 24.366337°N 88.434107°E
- Country: India
- State: West Bengal
- District: Murshidabad

Government
  - Type: Panchayat

Languages
  - Official: Bengali, English
- Time zone: UTC+5:30 (IST)
- PIN: 742135
- Lok Sabha constituency: Murshidabad
- Vidhan Sabha constituency: Bhagabangola
- Website: murshidabad.gov.in

Nirmal Char is a river island of the Bhagawangola II community developed block of Murshidabad District in West Bengal, India.

== History ==
The Akheriganj area with a population of 20,000 living in an area of 50 square miles eroded the Padma River and that led to the natural formation of Nirmal Char.

The population of this region consisted of persons displaced from other floodporne areas like Patibna (partly destroyed), Akhriganj Mouza (fully destroyed), Khoribona (partly destroyed), Sankarpur (partly destroyed), Munsarpur (fully destroyed), Hasanpur (partly destroyed) and settled in Nirmal Char.

== Geography ==
Nirmal Char is an island created by deposition of silt in the Padma River. To the north of it is the international India-Bangladesh border. To the southeast Raninagar-I and II. To the south is a portion of Bhagawangola-II community development block. To the south-west is Murshidabad-Jiaganj. Bhagawangola-I is situated on the North-west part.

== See also ==
- River bank erosion along the Ganges in Malda and Murshidabad districts
