= Kismattatla =

- Village
- Location in West Bengal, India Kismattatla (India)
- Coordinates: 24.3066°N 88.2983°E
- Country: India
- State: West Bengal
- District: Murshidabad

Population (2011)
  - Total: 3,045

Languages
  - Official: Bengali, English
- Time zone: UTC+5:30 (IST)
- PIN: 742286
- Telephone/STD code: 03482
- Lok Sabha constituency: Murshidabad
- Vidhan Sabha constituency: Bhagabangola
- Website: murshidabad.gov.in

Kismattatla is a village in the Bhagawangola I CD block in the Lalbag subdivision of Murshidabad district in the state of West Bengal, India.

== Geography ==
Cities, towns and locations in the Lalbag and Domkal subdivisions, Murshidabad district
M: municipal town, CT: census town, R: rural/ urban centre, H: historical place
Owing to space constraints in the small map, the actual locations in a larger map may vary slightly

=== Location ===
Kismattatla is located at 24.3066°N 88.2983°E.

=== Area overview ===
While the Lalbag subdivision is spread across both the natural physiographic regions of the district, Rarh and Bagri, the Domkal subdivision occupies the north-eastern corner of Bagri. In the map alongside, the Ganges/ Padma River flows along the northern portion. The border with Bangladesh can be seen in the north and the east. Murshidabad district shares with Bangladesh a 150 km long porous border which is notoriously crime prone (partly shown in this map). The Ganges has a tendency to change course frequently, causing severe erosion, mostly along the southern bank. The historic city of Murshidabad, a centre of major tourist attraction, is located in this area. In 1717, when Murshid Quli Khan became Subahdar, he made Murshidabad the capital of Subah Bangla (then Bengal, Bihar and Odisha). The entire area is overwhelmingly rural with over 90% of the population living in the rural areas.

Note: The map alongside presents some of the notable locations in the subdivisions. All places marked in the map are linked in the larger full screen map.

== Demographics ==
According to the 2011 Census of India, Kismattatla had a total population of 3,045, of which 1,572 (52%) were males and 1,473 (48%) were females. Population in the age range 0–6 years was 454. The total number of literate persons in Kismattatla was 1,639 (63.26% of the population over 6 years).

== Transport ==
Buses are available within the village and the nearest railway station is about 5 km away.

== Healthcare ==
Kanapukur Rural Hospital, with 15 beds at Kismattatla, is the major government medical facility in Bhagwangola I CD block.

See also - Healthcare in West Bengal
