= Raninagar I =

- Community development block
- Interactive map of Raninagar I
- Coordinates: 24.1545910°N 88.4947890°E
- Country: India
- State: West Bengal
- District: Murshidabad

Government
  - Type: Federal democracy

Area
  - Total: 171.07 km^{2} (66.05 sq mi)
- Elevation: 22 m (72 ft)

Population (2011)
  - Total: 189,105
  - Density: 1,105.4/km^{2} (2,863.0/sq mi)

Languages
  - Official: Bengali, English

Literacy
  - Literacy (2011): 57.81%
- Time zone: UTC+5:30 (IST)
- PIN: 742304 (Islampur)
- Telephone/STD code: 03482
- ISO 3166 code: IN-WB
- Vehicle registration: WB-57, WB-58
- Lok Sabha constituency: Mushidabad
- Vidhan Sabha constituency: Raninagar
- Website: murshidabad.gov.in

Raninagar I is a community development block that forms an administrative division in Domkol subdivision of Murshidabad district in the Indian state of West Bengal.

== Geography ==
Islampur is located at 24°09′17″N 88°29′41″E

Raninagar I CD block lies in the Raninagar plain at the north-eastern corner of the Bagri region in Murshidabad district. The Bhagirathi River splits the district into two natural physiographic regions – Rarh on the west and Bagri on the east. The Padma River separates Murshidabad district from Malda district and Chapai Nawabganj and Rajshahi districts of Bangladesh in the north. The Raninagar plain lies between the Jalangi and Bhairab rivers. It is a low-lying area and is characterized by the nature of inundation along with many swamps

Raninagar I CD block is bounded by Raninagar II and Bhagawangola II CD blocks in the north, Jalangi CD block in the east, Domkal and Hariharpara CD blocks in the south and Murshidabad-Jiaganj CD block in the west.

The Bagri or the eastern part of the district is a low lying alluvial plain with the shape of an isosceles triangle. The Ganges/Padma and the Bhagirathi form the two equal sides; the Jalangi forms the entire base; other offshoots of the Ganges meander within the area. It is liable to be flooded by the spill of the Bhagirathi and other rivers. The main rivers of this region are Bhairab, Jalangi, Chhoto Bhairab, Sialmari and Gobra Nala. All these rivers are distributaries of the main branch of the Ganges. The rivers are in their decaying stages.

A major problem in Murshidabad district is river bank erosion. As of 2013, an estimated 2.4 million people reside along the banks of the Ganges alone. Between 1931 and 1977, 26,769 hectares of land were eroded and many villages fully submerged.

See also - River bank erosion along the Ganges in Malda and Murshidabad districts

Raninagar I CD block has an area of 146.93 km^{2}. It has 1 panchayat samity, 6 gram panchayats, 125 gram sansads (village councils), 64 mouzas and 57 inhabited villages. Islampur police station serves this block. Headquarters of this CD block is at Kasbagoas.

Gram panchayats of Raninagar I block/ panchayat samiti are: Herampur, Hurshi, Islampur Chak, Lochanpur, Paharpur, and Tenkaraipur Balumati.

== Demographics ==
=== Population ===
According to the 2011 Census of India, Raninagar I CD block had a total population of 189,105, of which 164,675 were rural and 24,430 were urban. There were 96,248 (51%) males and 92,857 (49%) females. The population in the age range 0-6 years numbered 26,532. Scheduled Castes numbered 14,293 (7.56%) and Scheduled Tribes numbered 489 (0.26).

As per 2001 census, Raninagar I block has a total population of 154,559, out of which 79,565 were males and 74,994 were females. Raninagar I block registered a population growth of 22.22 per cent during the 1991-2001 decade. Decadal growth for the district was 23.70 per cent. Decadal growth in West Bengal was 17.84 per cent.

Decadal Population Growth Rate (%)

- Raninagar I CD block
- Murshidabad district
- West Bengal

The decadal growth of population in Raninagar I CD block in 2001-2011 was 22.31%.

The decadal growth rate of population in Murshidabad district was as follows: 33.5% in 1951-61, 28.6% in 1961-71, 25.5% in 1971-81, 28.2% in 1981-91, 23.8% in 1991-2001 and 21.1% in 2001-11. The decadal growth rate for West Bengal in 2001-11 was 13.93%.

The decadal growth rate of population in Rajshahi District, across the Ganges, in Bangladesh, was 13.48% for the decade 2001-2011, down from 21.19% in the decade 1991-2001.

There are reports of Bangladeshi infiltrators entering Murshidabad district.

=== Census towns and villages ===
There were two census towns in Raninagar I CD block (2011 population in brackets): Islampur (15,019) and Harharia Chak (9,411).

Large villages in Raninagar I CD block were (2011 population figures in brackets): Molladanga (5,463), Daulatpur (5,931), Hursi (4,315), Purushattompur (6,880), Durgapur (4,101), Pratappur (6,702), Lochanpur (8,067), Moktarpur (9,739), Kamalpur (7,692), Bishnupur (8,320), Tekaraipur (9,232), Dighir Pahar (5,202), Kasbagoas (5,766), Herampur (8,125), Goas Kalikapur (8,384) and Nalbatta (4,868).

=== Literacy ===
As per the 2011 census, the total number of literate persons in Raninagar I CD block was 109,327 (67.25% of the population over 6 years) out of which males numbered 56,733 (68.42% of the male population over 6 years) and females numbered 52,594 (66.03% of the female population over 6 years). The gender disparity (the difference between female and male literacy rates) was 2.39%.

See also – List of West Bengal districts ranked by literacy rate

Literacy in CD blocks of
Murshidabad district
Jangipur subdivision
Farakka – 59.75%
Samserganj – 54.98%
Suti I – 58.40%
Suti II – 55.23%
Raghunathganj I – 64.49%
Raghunathganj II – 61.17%
Sagardighi – 65.27%
Lalbag subdivision
Murshidabad-Jiaganj – 69.14%
Bhagawangola I - 57.22%
Bhagawangola II – 53.48%
Lalgola– 64.32%
Nabagram – 70.83%
Sadar subdivision
Berhampore – 73.51%
Beldanga I – 70.06%
Beldanga II – 67.86%
Hariharpara – 69.20%
Naoda – 66.09%
Kandi subdivision
Kandi – 65.13%
Khargram – 63.56%
Burwan – 68.96%
Bharatpur I – 62.93%
Bharatpur II – 66.07%
Domkol subdivision
Domkal – 55.89%
Raninagar I – 57.81%
Raninagar II – 54.81%
Jalangi – 58.73%
Source: 2011 Census: CD Block Wise
Primary Census Abstract Data

=== Language and religion ===
Religion in Raninagar I CD block (2011)
Islam	81.69%
Hinduism	18.20%
Other or not stated	0.11%

In the 2011 census, Muslims numbered 154,487 and formed 81.69% of the population in Raninagar I CD block. Hindus numbered 34,418 and formed 10.48% of the population. Others numbered 200 and formed 0.11% of the population. In Raninagar I and Raninagar II CD blocks taken together, while the proportion of Muslims increased from 78.77% in 1991 to 80.03% in 2001, the proportion of Hindus declined from 21.22% in 1991 to 19.78% in 2001.

Murshidabad district had 4,707,573 Muslims who formed 66.27% of the population, 2,359,061 Hindus who formed 33.21% of the population, and 37, 173 persons belonging to other religions who formed 0.52% of the population, in the 2011 census. While the proportion of Muslim population in the district increased from 61.40% in 1991 to 63.67% in 2001, the proportion of Hindu population declined from 38.39% in 1991 to 35.92% in 2001.

Bengali is the predominant language, spoken by 99.93% of the population.

== Rural poverty ==
As per the Human Development Report 2004 for West Bengal, the rural poverty ratio in Murshidabad district was 46.12%. Purulia, Bankura and Birbhum districts had higher rural poverty ratios. These estimates were based on Central Sample data of NSS 55th round 1999-2000.

== Economy ==
=== Livelihood ===
In Raninagar I CD block in 2011, amongst the class of total workers, cultivators numbered 12,168 and formed 19.22%, agricultural labourers numbered 30,526 and formed 48.22%, household industry workers numbered 4,483 and formed 7.08% and other workers numbered 216,125 and formed 25.47%.

=== Infrastructure ===
There are 57 inhabited villages in Raninagar I CD block. 100% villages have power supply and drinking water supply. 17 villages (29.82%) have post offices. 40 villages (70.18%) have telephones (including landlines, public call offices and mobile phones). 27 villages (47.37%) have a pucca approach road and 15 villages (26.32%) have transport communication (includes bus service, rail facility and navigable waterways). 5 villages (8.77%) have agricultural credit societies and 4 villages (7.02%) have banks.

=== Agriculture ===
Persons engaged in agriculture
in Raninagar I CD block
1. Bargadars (6.77%)
2. Patta holders (7.44%)
3. Small farmers (4.57%)
4. Marginal farmers (27.4%)
5. Agricultural labourers (53.8%)

From 1977 onwards major land reforms took place in West Bengal. Land in excess of land ceiling was acquired and distributed amongst the peasants. Following land reforms land ownership pattern has undergone transformation. In 2013-14, persons engaged in agriculture in Raninagar I CD block could be classified as follows: bargadars 3,842 (6.77%), patta (document) holders 4,222 (7.44%), small farmers (possessing land between 1 and 2 hectares) 2,595 (4.57%), marginal farmers (possessing land up to 1 hectare) 15,566 (27.43%) and agricultural labourers 30,526 (53.79%).

Raninagar I CD block had 70 fertiliser depots, 1 seed store and 32 fair price shops in 2013-14.

Though the main administrative block offices are situated in Kasbagoas, the main bazaar of this block is Islampur.

In 2013-14, Raninagar I CD block produced 8,101 tonnes of Aman paddy, the main winter crop from 2,654 hectares, 13,865 tonnes of Boro paddy (spring crop) from 3,289 hectares, 2,709 tonnes of Aus paddy (summer crop) from 1,064 hectares, 26,581 tonnes of wheat from 9,078 hectares, 202 tonnes of maize from 78 hectares, 119,818 tonnes of jute from 8,915 hectares, 4,285 tonnes of potatoes from 234 hectares and 3,535 tonnes of sugar cane from 44 hectares. It also produced pulses and oilseeds.

In 2013-14, the total area irrigated in Raninagar I CD block was 8,931 hectares, out of which 234 hectares were irrigated with river lift irrigation, 247 hectares by deep tube well and 8,450 hectares by other means.

=== Silk and handicrafts ===
Murshidabad is famous for its silk industry since the Middle Ages. There are three distinct categories in this industry, namely (i) Mulberry cultivation and silkworm rearing (ii) Peeling of raw silk (iii) Weaving of silk fabrics. Prime locations for weaving (silk and cotton) are: Khargram, Raghunathganj I, Nabagram, Beldanga I, Beldanga II and Raninagar-I CD Blocks.

Ivory carving is an important cottage industry from the era of the Nawabs. The main areas where this industry has flourished are Khagra and Jiaganj. 99% of ivory craft production is exported. In more recent years sandalwood etching has become more popular than ivory carving. Bell metal and Brass utensils are manufactured in large quantities at Khagra, Berhampore, Kandi and Jangipur. Beedi making has flourished in the Jangipur subdivision.

=== Banking ===
In 2013-14, Raninagar I CD block had offices of 5 commercial banks and 2 gramin banks.

Three nationalised banks (United Bank Of India, Bank of Baroda and State Bank of India) serve this area.

=== Backward Regions Grant Fund ===
Murshidabad district is listed as a backward region and receives financial support from the Backward Regions Grant Fund. The fund, created by the Government of India, is designed to redress regional imbalances in development. As of 2012, 272 districts across the country were listed under this scheme. The list includes 11 districts of West Bengal.

== Transport ==
Raninagar I CD block has 10 ferry services and 10 originating/ terminating bus routes. The nearest railway station is 25 km from the CD Block headquarters.

State Highway 11, running from Mahammad Bazar (in Birbhum district) to Ranaghat (in Nadia district) passes through this CD Block.

== Education ==
In 2013-14, Raninagar I CD block had 79 primary schools with 10,243 students, 18 middle schools with 2,571 students, 5 high schools with 6,026 students and 8 higher secondary schools with 15,796 students. Raninagar I CD block had 1 general college with 4,220 students and 332 institutions for special and non-formal education with 14,709 students.

Murshidabad Adarsha Mahavidyalaya was established in 1981 at Islampur. Affiliated with the University of Kalyani, it offers honours courses in Bengali, English, history, philosophy and political science.

The educational infrastructure consists of one general degree college (Murshidabad Adarsa Mahavidyalaya), eight co-ed Higher Secondary Schools (Nashipur High Madrasah, Chak Islampur S.C.M. High School, Goas Kalikapur High School, Chak Girls' High School, Nazirpur Esserpara High School, Huda Herampur High School, Pamaipur High Madrasah, Paharpur Union High School and Lochanpur N. K.High School) and one Secondary Girls' School (Islampur Girls' High School).

In Raninagar I CD block, amongst the 57 inhabited villages, 6 villages do not have a school, 27 villages have more than 1 primary school, 19 villages have at least 1 primary and 1 middle school and 9 villages had at least 1 middle and 1 secondary school.

== Healthcare ==
In 2014, Raninagar I CD block had 1 rural hospital, 2 primary health centres and 4 private nursing homes with total 46 beds and 5 doctors (excluding private bodies). It had 25 family welfare subcentres. 7,610 patients were treated indoor and 252,122 patients were treated outdoor in the hospitals, health centres and subcentres of the CD Block.

Raninagar I CD block has Islampur Rural Hospital at Islampur (with 30 beds), Hurshi Primary Health Centre at Maricha (with 6 beds) and Herampur PHC (with 10 beds).

The whole block is served by Islampur Gramin Hospital which is in poor condition as almost all the hospitals of rural Bengal.

Raninagar I CD block is one of the areas of Murshidabad district where ground water is affected by a high level of arsenic contamination. The WHO guideline for arsenic in drinking water is 10 mg/ litre, and the Indian Standard value is 50 mg/ litre. All but one of the 26 blocks of Murshidabad district have arsenic contamination above the WHO level, all but two of the blocks have arsenic concentration above the Indian Standard value and 17 blocks have arsenic concentration above 300 mg/litre. The maximum concentration in Raninagar I CD block is 1,018 mg/litre.
