= Bhagawangola =

- Town
- Location in West Bengal, India Bhagawangola (India)
- Coordinates: 24.3324°N 88.3067°E
- Country: India
- State: West Bengal
- District: Murshidabad

Languages
  - Official: Bengali, English
- Time zone: UTC+5:30 (IST)
- PIN: 742135 (Bhagawangola)
- Lok Sabha constituency: Murshidabad
- Vidhan Sabha constituency: Bhagabangola
- Website: murshidabad.gov.in

Bhagawangola is a growing town with a police station, not identified in 2011 census as a separate place, in the Bhagwangola I CD block in the Lalbag subdivision of Murshidabad district in the state of West Bengal, India.

== Civic administration ==
=== Police station ===
Bhagawangola police station has jurisdiction over Bhagawangola I CD block.

=== CD block HQ ===
The headquarters of Bhagwangola I CD block are located at Bhagwangola.

== Geography ==
Cities, towns and locations in the Lalbag and Domkal subdivisions, Murshidabad district
M: municipal town, CT: census town, R: rural/ urban centre, H: historical place
Owing to space constraints in the small map, the actual locations in a larger map may vary slightly

=== Location ===
Bhagwangola is located at 24.3324°N 88.3067°E.

=== Area overview ===
While the Lalbag subdivision is spread across both the natural physiographic regions of the district, Rarh and Bagri, the Domkal subdivision occupies the north-eastern corner of Bagri. In the map alongside, the Ganges/ Padma River flows along the northern portion. The border with Bangladesh can be seen in the north and the east. Murshidabad district shares with Bangladesh a porous international border which is notoriously crime prone (partly shown in this map). The Ganges has a tendency to change course frequently, causing severe erosion, mostly along the southern bank. The historic city of Murshidabad, a centre of major tourist attraction, is located in this area. In 1717, when Murshid Quli Khan became Subahdar, he made Murshidabad the capital of Subah Bangla (then Bengal, Bihar and Odisha). The entire area is overwhelmingly rural with over 90% of the population living in the rural areas.

Note: The map alongside presents some of the notable locations in the subdivisions. All places marked in the map are linked in the larger full screen map.

== History ==
Bhagwangola was an important river port on the Ganges in the 18th century. It was 18 miles from Murshidabad. As a result of its strategic location it became an important trade and commerce centre. Bhagwangola controlled the trend of market prices in the entire region till Calcutta Port took over towards the end of the 18th century.

== Transport ==
SH 11A, runs from Bhagwangola to Raghunathganj.

Bhagwangola railway station is situated on the Ranaghat-Lalgola branch line.

== See also ==
- River bank erosion along the Ganges in Malda and Murshidabad districts
