= Lalbag subdivision =

- Subdivision
- Interactive map of Lalbag subdivision
- Coordinates: 24.18°N 88.27°E
- Country: India
- State: West Bengal
- District: Murshidabad
- Headquarters: Murshidabad

Area
  - Total: 1,019.10 km^{2} (393.48 sq mi)

Population (2011)
  - Total: 1,253,886
  - Density: 1,230.39/km^{2} (3,186.68/sq mi)

Languages
  - Official: Bengali, English
- Time zone: UTC+5:30 (IST)
- ISO 3166 code: IN-WB
- Vehicle registration: WB
- Website: wb.gov.in

Lalbag subdivision is an administrative subdivision of Murshidabad district in the state of West Bengal, India.

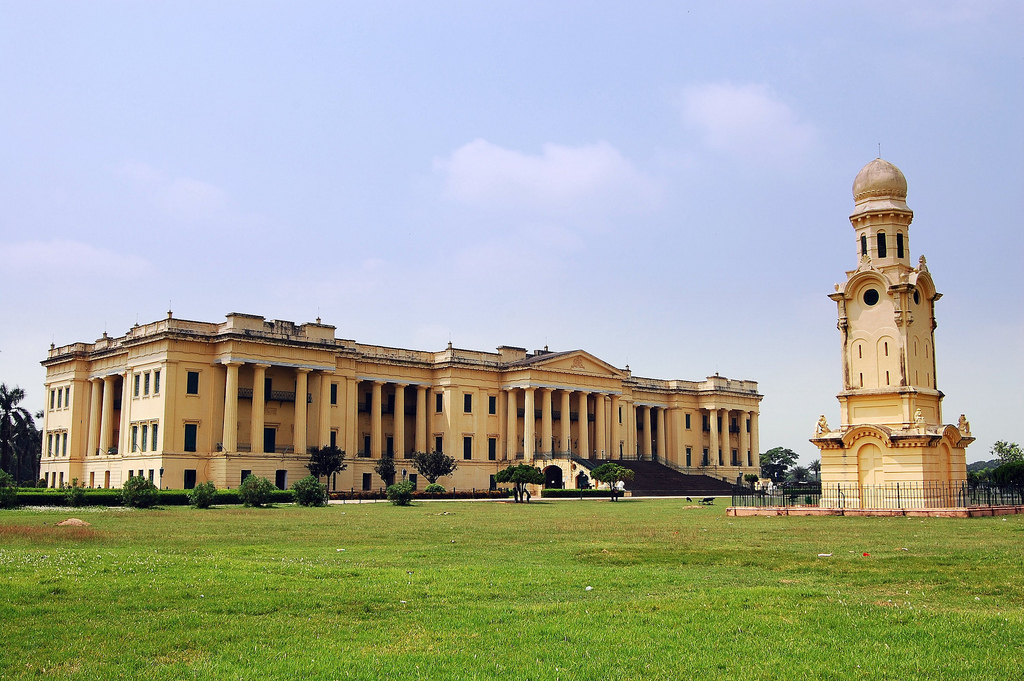
The Hazarduari Palace with the clock tower in the foreground

== Overview ==
The Bhagirathi River splits the Murshidabad district into two natural physiographic regions – Rarh on the west and Bagri on the east. The Lalbag subdivision is spread over both Bagri and Rarh physiographic regions from the Jalangi-Bhagirathi Interfluve to the Ganges-Bhagirathi basin to the Nabagram plains.

== History ==
In 1704, when Murshid Quli Khan was Divan, he shifted his headquarters from Dhaka to Maksudabad and renamed it Murshidabad. In 1717, when Murshid Quli Khan became Subahdar, he made Murshidabad the capital of Subah Bangla (then Bengal, Bihar and Odisha).

After the defeat of Siraj ud-Daulah in the Battle of Plassey by the forces of the British East India Company, in 1757, Mir Jafar became a puppet ruler. In 1773, the East India Company established a capital in Calcutta and appointed its first Governor-General, Warren Hastings, and became directly involved in governance.

== Geography ==
=== Subdivisions ===
Murshidabad district is divided into the following administrative subdivisions:

Subdivision	Headquarters	Area km^{2}	Population (2011)	Rural population % (2011)	Urban population % (2011)
Barhampur	Baharampur	1,195.57	1,725,525	80.15	19.85
Kandi	Kandi	1,200.76	1,155,645	93.21	6.79
Jangipur	Jangipur	1,097.82	1,972,308	56.43	43.57
Lalbag	Murshidabad	1,019.10	1,253,886	92.36	7.64
Domkol	Domkol	837.88	996,443	97.55	2.45
Murshidabad district		5,324.00	7,103,807	80.28	19.72

Cities, towns and locations in the Lalbag and Domkal subdivisions, Murshidabad district
M: municipal town, CT: census town, R: rural/ urban centre, H: historical place
Owing to space constraints in the small map, the actual locations in a larger map may vary slightly

=== Administrative units ===
Lalbag subdivision has 6 police stations, 5 community development blocks, 5 panchayat samitis, 44 gram panchayats, 474 mouzas, 430 inhabited villages and 2 municipalities. The municipalities are: Murshidabad and Jiaganj Azimganj. The subdivision has its headquarters at Murshidabad.

=== Police stations ===
Police stations in Lalbag subdivision have the following features and jurisdiction:

Police station	Area covered km^{2}	India-Bangladesh border km	Municipal town	CD Block
Lalgola	n/a	n/a	-	Lalgola
Bhagawangola	n/a	n/a	-	Bhagawangola I
Ranitala	n/a	n/a	-	Bhagawangola II
Murshidabad	n/a	-	Murshidabad	Murshidabad-Jiaganj (partly)
Jiaganj	n/a	-	Jiaganj Azimganj	Murshidabad-Jiaganj (partly)
Nabagram	n/a	-	-	Nabagram

Murshidabad district has a 125.35 km long international border with Bangladesh of which 42.35 km is on land and the remaining is riverine.

There are reports of Bangladeshi infiltrators entering Murshidabad district. An estimate in 2000 places the total number of illegal Bangladeshi immigrants in India at 1.5 crore, with around 3 lakh entering every year. The thumb rule for such illegal immigrants is that for each illegal person caught four get through. While many immigrants have settled in the border areas, some have moved on, even to far way places such as Mumbai and Delhi. The border is guarded by the Border Security Force. During the UPA government, Sriprakash Jaiswal, Union Minister of State for Home Affairs, had made a statement in Parliament on 14 July 2004, that there were 12 million illegal Bangladeshi infiltrators living in India, and West Bengal topped the list with 5.7 million Bangladeshis. More recently, Kiren Rijiju, Minister of State for Home Affairs in the NDA government has put the figure at around 20 million. Critics point out that the Bengali politicians, particularly those from the ruling Trinamool Congress and the CPI (M), believe that a soft approach to the problem help them to win Muslim votes.

=== Blocks ===
Community development blocks in Lalbag subdivision are:

CD Block	Headquarters	Area km^{2}	Population (2011)	SC %	ST %	Muslims %	Hindus %	Decadal Growth Rate 2001-2011 %	Literacy rate %	Census Towns
Lalgola	Lalgola	184.37	335,831	9.30	0.05	80.25	19.50	25.48	64.32	-
Bhagawangola I	Bhagawangola	136.10	202,071	7.20	0.14	85.67	14.19	23.62	66.79	-
Bhagawangola II	Nasipur	175.26	158,024	3.30	0.03	89.43	10.48	21.65	62.82	-
Murshidabad-Jiaganj	Murshidabad	192.13	234,565	17.24	5.25	54.52	44.61	17.13	69.12	-
Nabagram	Nabagram	306.63	227,586	24.88	7.37	52.59	45.17	15.76	70.83	-

=== Gram Panchayats ===
The subdivision contains 44 gram panchayats under 5 community development blocks:

- Murshidabad–Jiaganj CD Block - Bahadurpur, Kapasdanga, Prasadpur, Dahapara, Mukundabag, Tentulia, Dangapara and Natungram.
- Bhagawangola–I CD block - Bhagawangola, Hanumantanagar, Kuthirampur, Mahisasthali, Habaspur, Kantanagar, Mahammadpur and Sundarpur.
- Bhagawangola–II CD Block - Akheriganj, Baligram, Nashipur, Amdahara, Kharibona and Saralpur.
- Lalgola CD Block - Airmari Krishnapur, Dewansarai, Lalgola, Nashipur, Bahadurpur, JasaitalaJasaitala., Manikchak, Paikpara, Bilborakopra, Kalmegha, Maiya and Ramchandrapur.
- Nabagram CD Block - Amarkundu, Kiriteswari, Narayanpur, Shibpur, Gura–Pashla, Mahurul, Panchgram, Hajbibidanga, Nabagram and Rasulpur.

=== River bank erosion ===
As of 2013, an estimated 2.4 million people reside along the banks of the Ganges alone in Murshidabad district. The main channel of the Ganges has a bankline of 94 km along its right bank from downstream of Farakka Barrage to Jalangi. Severe erosion occurs all along this bank. The encroaching river wiped out 50 mouzas and engulfed about 10,000 hectares of fertile land. The following blocks have to face the brunt of erosion year after year: Farakka, Samserganj, Suti I, Suti II, Raghunathganj II, Lalgola, Bhagawangola I, Bhagawangola II, Raninagar I, Raninagar II and Jalangi. As per official estimate, till 1992-94 more than 10,000 hectares of chars (flood plain sediment island) have developed in main places, which have become inaccessible from the Indian side but can be reached easily from Bangladesh.

See also - River bank erosion along the Ganges in Malda and Murshidabad districts

== Economy ==
=== Infrastructure ===
All inhabited villages in Murshidabad district have power supply.

See the individual block pages for more information about the infrastructure available.

=== Agriculture ===
Murshidabad is a predominantly agricultural district. A majority of the population depends on agriculture for a living. The land is fertile. The eastern portion of the Bhagirathi, an alluvial tract, is very fertile for growing Aus paddy, jute and rabi crops. The Kalantar area in the south-eastern portion of the district, is a low-lying area with stiff dark clay and supports mainly the cultivation of Aman paddy. The west flank of the Bhagirathi is a lateritic tract intersected by numerous bils and old river beds. It supports the cultivation of Aman paddy, sugar cane and mulberry.

Given below is an overview of the agricultural production (all data in tonnes) for Lalbag subdivision, other subdivisions and the Murshidabad district, with data for the year 2013-14.

CD Block/ Subdivision	Rice	Wheat	Jute	Pulses	Oil seeds	Potatoes	Sugarcane
Lalgola	10,903	9,870	134,085	2,697	7,511	4.176	-
Bhagawangola I	4,799	902	95,908	2,529	5,088	8,940	-
Bhagawangola II	2,304	322	90,697	232	5,141	7,303	-
Murshidabad-Jiaganj	6,243	8,930	91,177	2,262	4,451	9,499	-
Nabagram	43,785	280	15,583	89	401	11,079	3,295
Lalbag subdivision	68,034	20,304	427,450	7,809	22,592	40,997	3,295
Barhampur subdivision	268,587	109,091	914,791	5,758	35,315	39,914	160,221
Kandi subdivision	487,207	4,157	6,186	4,818	9,355	85,886	106,646
Jangipur subdivision	207,472	45,261	207,425	9,374	12,375	38,197	52,344
Domkol subdivision	80,899	109,518	730,393	16,755	33,410	117,082	25,023
Murshidabad district	1,112,199	288,331	2,286,245	44,514	113,047	322.076	347,529

== Education ==
Murshidabad district had a literacy rate of 66.59% (for population of 7 years and above) as per the census of India 2011. Barhampur subdivision had a literacy rate of 72.60%, Kandi subdivision 66.28%, Jangipur subdivision 60.95%, Lalbag subdivision 68.00% and Domkal subdivision 68.35%.

Given in the table below (data in numbers) is a comprehensive picture of the education scenario in Murshidabad district for the year 2013-14:

Subdivision	Primary School		Middle School		High School		Higher Secondary School		General College, Univ		Technical / Professional Instt		Non-formal Education	
Subdivision	Institution	Student	Institution	Student	Institution	Student	Institution	Student	Institution	Student	Institution	Student	Institution	Student
Barhampur	728	88,371	107	13,364	37	31,214	92	162,613	7	17,418	11	2,796	2,278	100,164
Kandi	672	66,030	105	11,248	46	32,752	61	87,482	5	7,830	3	400	1,717	74,370
Jangipur	747	144,416	72	14,159	25	30,004	76	194,025	5	15,335	5	500	2,793	160,236
Lalbag	601	72,429	74	8,997	24	22,174	66	120,454	5	13,088	7	759	2,082	93,891
Domkol	432	52,177	73	11,791	22	23,201	47	86,672	3	7,211	11	2,457	1,612	74,330
Murshidabad district	3,180	423,423	431	59,559	154	139,345	342	651,246	25	60,882	37	6,912	10,482	502,991

Note: Primary schools include junior basic schools; middle schools, high schools and higher secondary schools include madrasahs; technical schools include junior technical schools, junior government polytechnics, industrial technical institutes, industrial training centres, nursing training institutes etc.; technical and professional colleges include engineering colleges, medical colleges, para-medical institutes, management colleges, teachers training and nursing training colleges, law colleges, art colleges, music colleges etc. Special and non-formal education centres include sishu siksha kendras, madhyamik siksha kendras, centres of Rabindra mukta vidyalaya, recognised Sanskrit tols, institutions for the blind and other handicapped persons, Anganwadi centres, reformatory schools etc.

The following institutions are located in Lalbag subdivision:

- Subhas Chandra Bose Centenary College was established in 1998 at Lalbagh.
- Lalgola College was established in 2006 at Lalgola
- Nabagram Amar Chand Kundu College was established in 2009 at Nabagram.
- Sripat Singh College was established in 1949 at Jiaganj. The Śvetāmbara Jain zemindar of Jiaganj, Sripat Singh Dugar, gifted the palatial out-house of his palace and a handsome sum in cash for the college. Affiliated with the University of Kalyani, Along with undergraduate courses, it offers post graduation in Bengali.
- Rani Dhanya Kumari College was initially started as an evening college in the premises of Sripat Singh College in 1962 at Jiaganj. It shifted to its present premises in 1972.
- Jiaganj College of Engineering and Technology at Jiaganj offers diploma courses in engineering.

== Healthcare ==
The table below (all data in numbers) presents an overview of the medical facilities available and patients treated in the hospitals, health centres and sub-centres in 2014 in Murshidabad district.

Subdivision	Health & Family Welfare Deptt, WB				Other State Govt Deptts	Local bodies	Central Govt Deptts / PSUs	NGO / Private Nursing Homes	Total	Total Number of Beds	Total Number of Doctors*	Indoor Patients	Outdoor Patients
Subdivision	Hospitals	Rural Hospitals	Block Primary Health Centres	Primary Health Centres	Other State Govt Deptts	Local bodies	Central Govt Deptts / PSUs	NGO / Private Nursing Homes	Total	Total Number of Beds	Total Number of Doctors*	Indoor Patients	Outdoor Patients
Barhampur	2	2	4	15	3	-	-	45	71	1,645	282	149,393	2,094,027
Kandi	1	2	3	17	1	-	-	6	30	567	68	85,624	1,005,056
Jangipur	1	1	6	15	-	-	2	12	37	590	62	141,427	1,043,548
Lalbag	1	2	3	14	-	1	1	23	45	483	65	105,562	1,154,275
Domkol	1	2	2	9	-	-	-	19	33	252	44	45,110	802,309
Murshidabad district	6	9	18	70	4	1	3	105	216	2,537	521	527,116	6,099,215

.* Excluding nursing homes

Medical facilities in Lalbag subdivision are as follows:
Hospitals: (Name, location, beds)
Lalbag Subdivisional Hospital, Murshidabad, 250 beds

Rural Hospitals: (Name, block, location, beds)
Jiaganj Rural Hospital, Murshidabad-Jiaganj CD Block, Jiaganj, 30 beds
Krishnapur Rural Hospital, Lalgola CD Block, Krishnapur, 50 beds
Kanapukur Rural Hospital, Bhagawangola I CD Block, Kismattatla, 15 beds

Block Primary Health Centres: (Name, block, location, beds)
Nabagram BPHC, Nabagram CD Block, Nabagram, 15 beds
Nasipur BPHC, Bhagawangola II CD Block, Nasipur, 15 beds

Primary Health Centres: (CD Block-wise)(CD Block, PHC location, beds)
Murshidabad-Jiaganj CD Block: Azimganj (15), Dangapara, Hasanpur (4), Lalkuthi, Dahapara (4)
Nabagram CD Block: Panchgram (10), Nimgram-Beluri (4), Bagirapara, Rasulpur (4), Kiriteswari (6)
Lalgola CD Block: Rajarampur (4), Krishnapur-Dinupara (10)
Bhagawangola I CD Block: Oper-Orahar, Sundarpur (2), Habaspur (10)
Bhagawangola II CD Block: Fulpur (4), Kolan-Radhakantapur (10)

== Electoral constituencies ==
Lok Sabha (parliamentary) and Vidhan Sabha (state assembly) constituencies in Lalbag subdivision were as follows:

Lok Sabha constituency	Reservation	Vidhan Sabha constituency	Reservation	CD Block and/or Gram panchayats and/or municipal areas
Murshdiabad	None	Bhagabangola	None	Bhagawangola II community development block and Bhagawangola, Habaspur, Hanumantanagar, Kuthirampur, Mahammadpur, Mahisasthali and Sundarpur gram panchayats of Bhagawangola I CD Block
		Murshidabad	None	Murshidabad municipality, Jiaganj Azimganj municipality and Murshidabad-Jiaganj CD Block
		3 assembly segments in Domkal subdivision, 1 assembly segment each in Berhampore subdivision and Tehatta subdivision of Nadia district		
Jangipur	None	Lalgola	None	Airmari Krishnapur, Bahadurpur, Bilbora Kopra, Dewansarai, Jasaitala, Kalmegha, Lalgola, Manikchak, Nashipur, Paikpara and Ramchandrapur GPs of Lalgola CD Block and Kantanagar GP of Bhagawangola I CD Block
		Nabagram	Reserved for SC	Nabagram CD Block, and Niyallishpara Goaljan, Radharghat I, Radharghat II and Sahajadpur GPs of Berhampore CD Block
		4 assembly segments in Jangipur subdivision and 1 assembly segment in Kandi subdivision		
