= Bhagwangola railway station =

Railway station in West Bengal, India

Bhagwangola
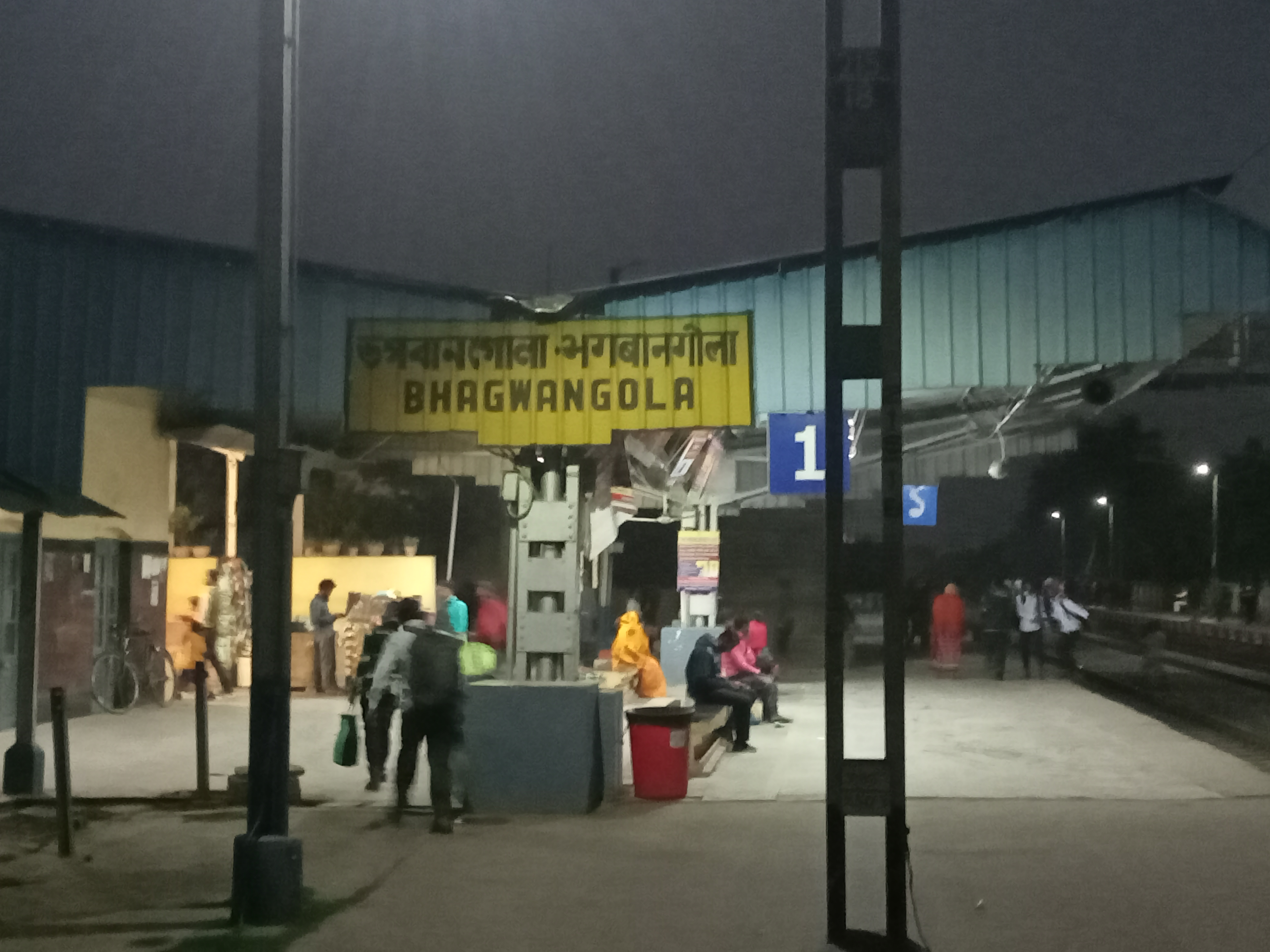

General information
- Location: Station Road, Bhagawangola, Murshidabad district, West Bengal; India
- Coordinates: 24.334956°N 88.307547°E
- Elevation: 23 m (75 ft)
- System: Express train, Passenger train and Suburban train station
- Owner: Indian Railways
- Operator: Eastern Railway zone
- Line: Sealdah–Lalgola main line
- Platforms: 2
- Tracks: 2

Construction
- Structure type: Standard (on ground station)
- Parking: No

Other information
- Status: Active
- Station code: BQG
- Zone(s): Eastern Railway zone
- Division(s): Sealdah

History
- Former names: East Indian Railway Company

Services
Preceding station	Kolkata Suburban Railway	Following station
Subarnamrigi towards Krishnanagar City Junction	Eastern Line Krishnanagar–Lalgola line	Pirtala towards Lalgola
Route map
Location
- Location within West Bengal Location within India

Bhagwangola is an Indian railway station of the Lalgola Ranaghat Sealdah branch lines in the Eastern Railway zone of Indian Railways. The station is situated at Bhagawangola in Murshidabad district in the Indian state of West Bengal. The railway station serves Bhagawangola town and its two Community Development Blocks area. Bhagirathi Express, Hazarduari Express, Lalgola Passengers and few EMU trains pass through the station.

== Electrification ==
The Krishnanagar–Lalgola section, including Bhagwangola railway station was electrified in 2004. In 2010 the line became double tracked.
