= State Highway 11A (West Bengal) =

Highway in West Bengal, India

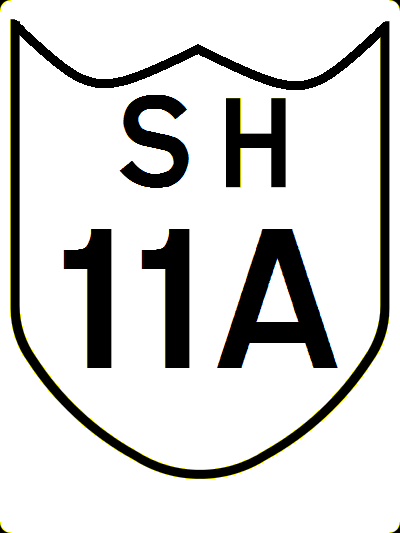
State Highway 11A

Route information
- Length: 65 km (40 mi)

Major junctions
- From: Bhagawangola
- To: Raghunathganj

Location
- Country: India
- State: West Bengal
- Districts: Murshidabad

Highway system
- Roads in India; Expressways; National; State; Asian; State Highways in West Bengal

State Highway 11A (West Bengal) is a state highway in West Bengal, India.

== Route ==
SH 11A originates from Bhagawangola and passes through Lalgola, Teghari, Jangipur and terminates at Raghunathganj.

The total length of SH 11A is 65 km.

== See also ==
- List of state highways in West Bengal
