= River bank failure =

Natural phenomenon

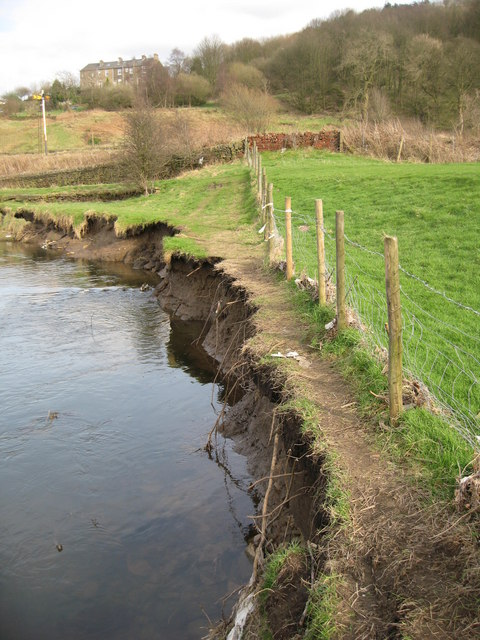
River erosion in the UK.

A river bank failure is a sudden mass wasting off the bank of a stream, which can be caused when the gravitational forces acting on the bankside rocks and soils exceed the adhesive and cohesive forces that hold them together. Failure depends on sediment type, layering, and moisture content.

All rivers and creeks experience bank erosion due to constant friction, shearing and solvation between the water current and the pedosphere contacting the streamflow, but a catastrophic failure of the bankside is dependent on the location, the surrounding conditions and the rate at which such erosion is occurring. Bank erosion is accelerated by higher discharge (e.g. due to floods) which increases both the flow rate and the water level (which increases the contact area between water and soil); by helicoidal flow upon the outside of a riverbend (which corrade it into a steep or concave cut bank); and by downcutting of riparian surface runoff rills/gullies (which fragmentate the bankside into mechanically separate segments), all of which compromise the overall structural integrity of the bank over time. River bank failures can also be catalyzed by additional weight upon the bank (e.g. landslides towards the bank, parking of vehicles, or even just people standing at the edge), downpours and soil saturation (which destabilizes the soil), undermining of the bankside by groundwater flow, burrows and artificial boring/piling, vegetation changes (which alters the anti-erosion properties of the rhizosphere) and sudden, repeated shocks (e.g. earthquakes) and/or tectonic activity. When man-made structures such as houses, bridge pillars and even roads are built too close to the bank of the river, their weight may also exceed the structural load the bank can hold at one time (either due to an increase in load, or due to decreased strength of the subgrade under the foundation) and cause slumping, or accelerate slumping that may already be active.

Adding to these stresses can be increased saturation caused by irrigation and septics, which reduce the soil's strength. While deep rooted vegetation can increase the strength of river banks, replacement with grass and shallower rooted vegetation can actually weaken the soil. Presence of lawns and concrete driveways concentrates runoff onto the riverbank, weakening it further. Foundations and structures further increase stress.

Although each mode of failure is clearly defined, investigation into soil types, bank composition, and environment must be clearly defined in order to establish the mode of failure, of which multiple types may be present on the same area at different times. Once failure has been classified, steps may be taken in order to prevent further erosion. If tectonic failure is at fault, research into its effects may aid in the understanding of alluvial systems and their responses to different stresses.

== Description ==
A river bank can be divided into three zones: Toe zone, bank zone, and overbank area. The toe zone is the area which is most susceptible to erosion. Because it is located in between the ordinary water level and the low water level, it is strongly affected by currents and erosional events. The bank zone is above the ordinary high water level, but can still be effected periodically by currents, and gets the most human and animal traffic. The overbank area is inland of both the toe and bank zones, and can be classified as either a floodplain or a bluff, depending on its slope. A river bank will respond to erosional activity based on the characteristics of the bank material. The most common type of bank is a stratified or interstratified bank, which consists of cohesionless layers interbedded with cohesive layers. If the cohesive soil is at the toe of the bank, it will control the retreat rate of the overlying layer. If the cohesionless soil is at the toe of the bank, these layers are not protected by the layers of cohesive soil. A Bedrock bank is usually very stable and will experience gradual erosion. A cohesive bank is highly susceptible to erosion in times of lowering water levels due to its low permeability. Failures in cohesive soils will be in rotational or planar failure surfaces, while in non-cohesive soils failures will be in an avalanche fashion.

== Modes of failure ==
Falling river level causing landslide

=== Hydraulically induced failure ===
Hydraulic processes at or below the surface of the water may entrain sediment and directly cause erosion. Non-cohesive banks are particularly vulnerable to this type of failure, due to bank undercutting, bed degradation, and basal clean-out.

Hydraulic toe erosion occurs when flow is in the direction of a bank at the bend of the river and the highest velocity is at the outer edge and in the center depth of the water. Centrifugal forces raise the water elevation so that it is highest on the outside bend, and as gravity pulls the water downward, a rolling, helical spiral happens, with downward velocities against the bank (erosive force). It will be highest in tight bends. The worst erosion will be immediately downstream from the point of maximum curvature. In cases with noncohesive layers, currents remove the material and create a cantilever overhang of cohesive material. Shear exceeds the critical shear at the toe of the bank, and particles are eroded. This then causes an overhang eventually resulting in bank retreat and failure.

Undercutting of a river bank consisting of an upper cohesive layer and lower non-cohesive layer

=== Geotechnical failure ===
Geotechnical failure usually occurs due to stresses on the bank exceeding the forces the bank can accommodate. One example is oversaturation of the bank following a lowering of the water level from the floodplain to normal bank levels. Pore water pressure in the saturated bank reduces the frictional shear strength of the soil and increases sliding forces. This type of failure is most common in fine grained soils because they cannot drain as rapidly as coarse grained soils. This can be accentuated if the banks had already been destabilized due to erosion of cohesionless sands, which undermines the bank material and leads to bank collapse. If the bank has been exposed to freeze thaw, tension cracks may lay lead to bank failure. Subsurface moisture weakens internal shear. Capillary action can also decrease the angle of repose of the bank to less than the existing bank slope. This oversteepens the slope and can lead to collapse when the soil dries.

Piping failure may occur when high groundwater seepage pressure increases, as well as the rate of flow. This causes collapse of part of the bank. Failure is usually due to selective groundwater flow along interbedded saturated layers within stratified river banks, with lenses of sand and coarser material in between layers of finer cohesive material.

=== Tectonic failure ===
Changes in the valley floor slope can influence alluvial rivers, which can happen due to tectonics. This may cause river bank failure, resulting in hazards to people living near to the river and to structures such as bridges, pipelines, and powerline crossings. While large and fast flowing rivers should maintain their original flow paths, low gradients makes effects caused by slope changes larger. Bank failure as the result of tectonics may also lead to avulsion, in which a river abandons its own river channel in favor of forming a new one. Avulsion due to tectonics is most common in rivers experiencing a high stand, in which bank failure has led to a loss of natural levees due to liquefication and fractures from an earthquake.

=== Gravitational failure ===
Gravitational failure includes shallow and rotational slides, slab and cantilever failures, and earthflows and dry granular flows. It is the process of detaching sediment primarily from a cohesive bank and transporting it fluvially.
Shallow failure occurs where a layer of material moves along planes parallel to bank surfaces. Failure is typical of soils with low cohesion, and occurs when the angle of the bank exceeds the angle of internal friction. Small to medium-sized blocks are forced out at or near the base of the river bank due to excessive pore water pressure and overburden. The slab of material in the lower half of the bank will fall out, leaving an alcove shaped cavity. Failure is usually associated with steep banks and saturated finer grained cohesive bank materials that allow buildup of positive pore water pressure and strong seepage within structure.
Popout failure is when small to medium-sized blocks are forced out at or near the base of the river bank due to excessive pore water pressure and overburden. The slab of material in the lower half of the bank will fall out, leaving an alcove shaped cavity. Failure is usually associated with steep banks and saturated finer grained cohesive bank materials that allow buildup of positive pore water pressure and strong seepage within structure. Small to medium-sized blocks are forced out at, or near the base of the river bank due to excessive pore water pressure and overburden.

Slab failure is the sliding and forward toppling of deep-seated mass into the river channel. Failures are associated with steep, low height, fine grained cohesive banks and occur during low flow conditions. They are the result of a combination of scour at the bank toe, high pore water pressure in the bank material, and tension crack at the top of the bank.

Cantilever failures occur when an overhanging blocks collapses into the channel. Failure often occurs after the bank has experienced undercutting. Failure is usually in a composite of fine and coarse grained material, and is active during low flow conditions.

Failure caused by dry granular flow occurs typically on non-cohesive banks at, or near to, the angle of repose, which are undercut. This increases the local bank angle above the friction angle, and individual grains roll, slide, and bounce down the bank in a layer. Accumulation usually occurs at the toe.

A wet earthflow occurs where the loss of strength of a section of bank due to saturation increases the weight of the bank and decreases the banks material strength so that the soil flows as a viscous liquid. This type of failure usually occurs on low angle banks and the affected material flows down the bank to form lobes of material at the toe.

Beam failure happens as the result of tension cracks in the overhang, and occurs only when the lower part of an overhang block fails along an almost horizontal failure surface.

== Examples ==
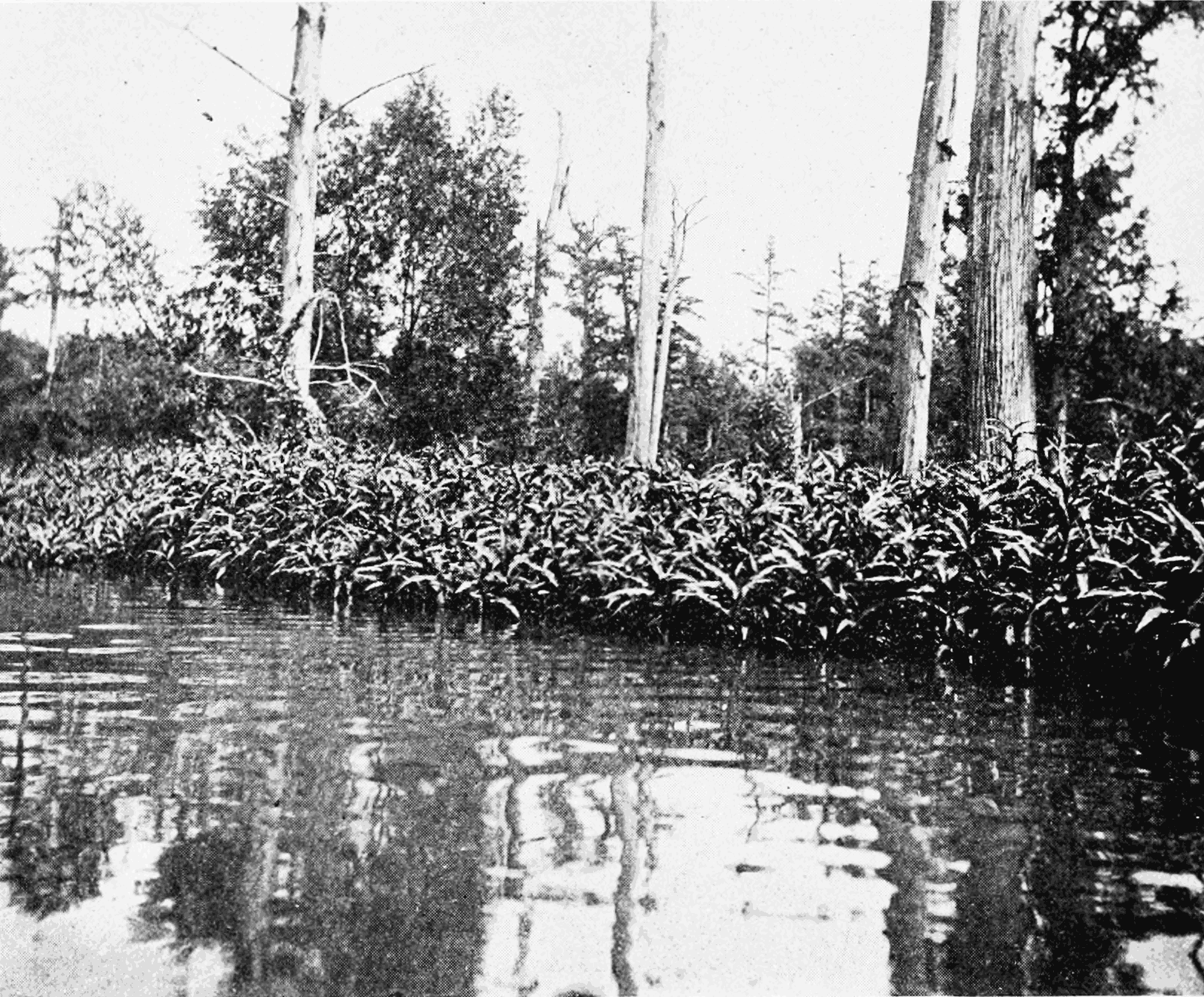
Sunken land formed by the New Madrid earthquake in Missouri

=== 1811–1812 New Madrid earthquake ===
The 1811–12 New Madrid earthquakes were caused by earthquakes on the Mississippi River, and represent bank failure caused by tectonic activity in the New Madrid Seismic Zone (NMSZ). The NMSZ is the result of a failed rift system which remains weak today, and thus is prone to faulting and earthquake activity. The earthquakes caused immediate bank failure, in which the surface banks fell above and below the water surface, causing swells large enough to sink a boat. Some swells were caused by the sediment falling into the river, but at other times the swells themselves hitting the banks caused large areas of the Mississippi banks to fall at one time. The waters of the Mississippi were seen to flow backwards, due to the shocks caused by the earthquake. Large amounts of sediment were introduced into the river. Bank caving was seen as far downriver as Memphis, Tennessee. Vertical offsets may have been the primary source of turbulence, though short lived.

=== Northwestern Minnesota bank failure ===
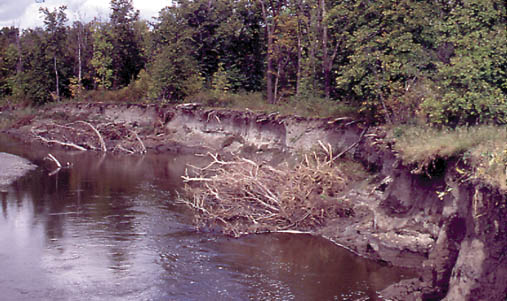
High flows erode the steep banks of the Pembina River, in northeastern North Dakota, contributing to the high sediment load.

Bank failure was located on the Red River and its tributaries. It was caused by erosion and represents slumping. Failure occurs in this area because river banks are composed of clay, due to glacial and lake deposition, as opposed to more resistant sediments such as sand or gravel. Most commonly, slumping exists in the Sherack Formation, which sits on a less competent formation called the Huot and Brenna Formations. The Sherack Formation is composed of silt and clay laminations, while the Brenna is a clay deposit. These less competent formations become exposed when the overlying Sherack Formation is eroded by the river valley. Cracks can also form in the Sherack Formation, causing weakness in the underlying clay, and slumping. The exposed contact between the formations (commonly in the Red River area), and thus the inherent weakness at this contact, causes mass wasting of the river bank. Human activity near the banks of the river then increases failure risks. Due to this human interference, the river's best mode of defense is to avoid unnecessary loading near the river and to enhance awareness of the issues leading to failure. When failure does occur, an understanding of the geotechnical parameters of the slope are necessary, and are the most heavily relied upon in order to understand the underlying causes. This can be accomplished by obtaining values for the plastic limit and liquid limit of the soils.

Also of interest are the interactions between streamflows and sediment contribution. The Red River and Minnesota receives contributions from the Pembina River of northeastern North Dakota. Erosion rates are very high for this river, and lead to extensive and steep erosion of the banks of the river. This increased runoff then produces increased streamflow and thus higher erosion events downstream, such as in the Red River.

== Solutions ==
River bank failure is dependent on many solutions, the most common of which are lime stabilization and retaining walls, riprap and sheet piling, maintaining deep vegetation, windrows and trenches, sacks and blocks, gabions and mattresses, soil-cement, and avoiding the construction of structures near the banks of the river.

=== Riprap ===
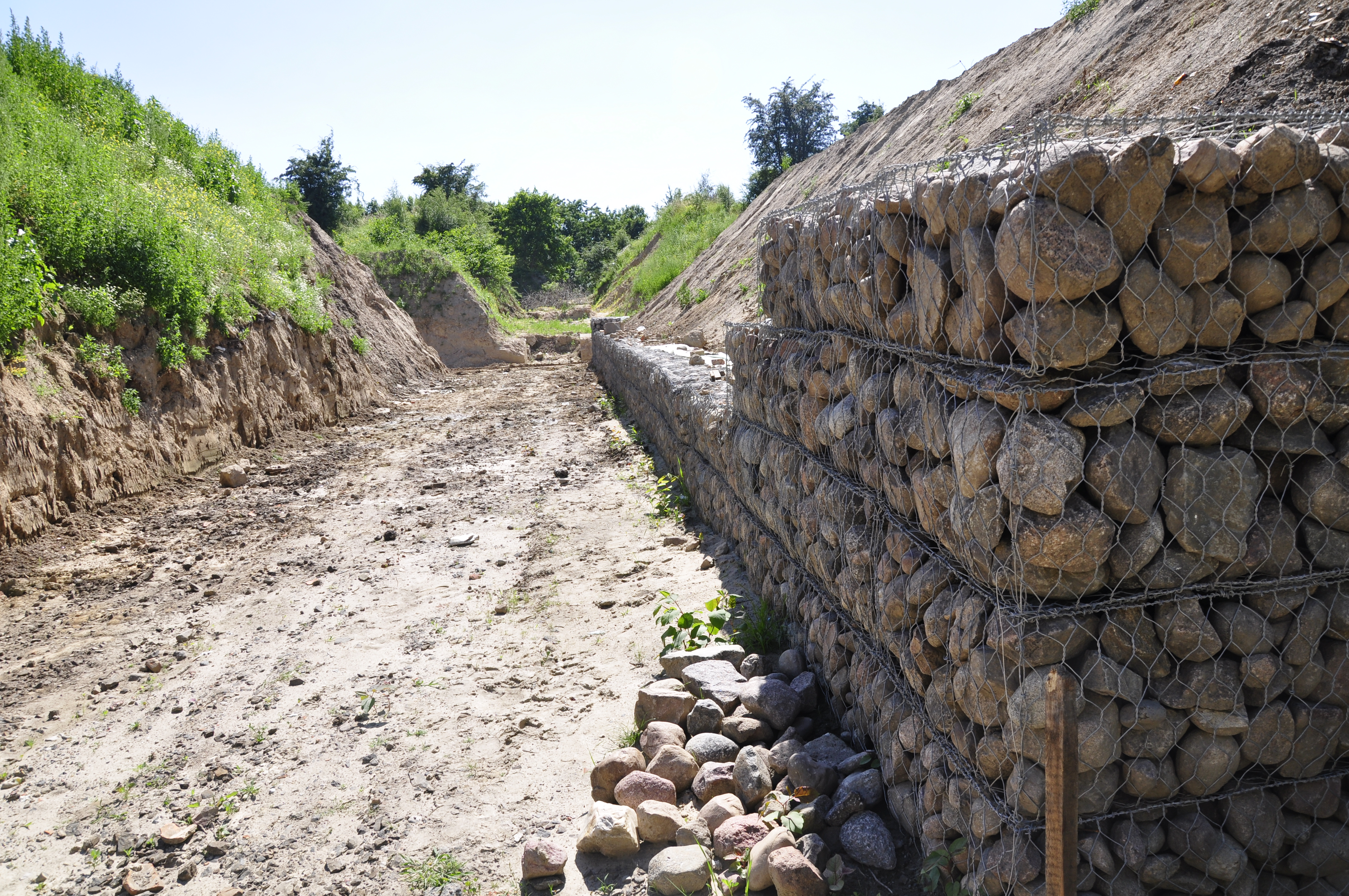
Riprap

Riprap made of rocks and other materials, arranged in a way as to inhibit erosional processes on a river bank. This method is expensive and can experience failure, but has the ability to be used for large areas. Failure is seen when the bank undergoes particle erosion, due to the stones being too small to resist shear stress, removal of individual stones weakening the overall riprap, the side slope of the bank being too steep for the riprap to resist the displacing forces, or gradation of riprap being too uniform (nothing to fill small spaces). Failure can also occur by slump, translational slide, or modified slump.

=== Windrows and trenches ===
Windrows are the piling of erosion-resistant material on a river's bank, where if buried, they become known as trenches. When erosion persists an already determined location, these windrows and trenches are made to slide down with the bank in order to protect it from further occurrences of erosion. This allows for the need of minimal design work, in that installation is simple on high banks, although other methods could lead to failure. Disadvantages include the windows and trenches continuing to erode until they intersect the erosion-resistant material. Results of this method have been seen to be inconsistent, as the steep slope of the bank leads to increased velocity of the river.

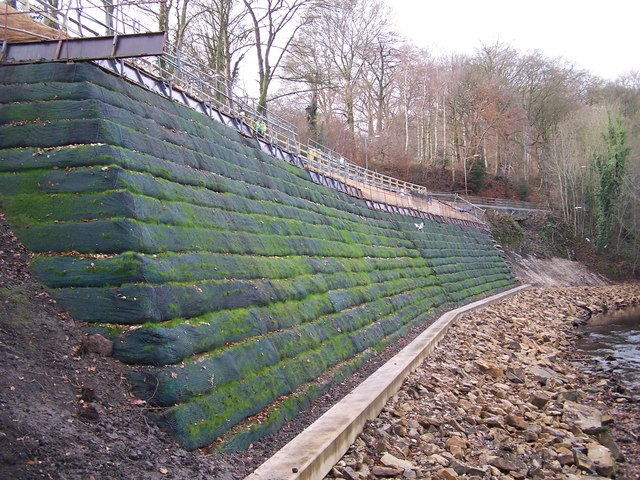
River Bank Repairs using sacks

=== Sacks/Blocks ===
Sacks and blocks may be used during flooding, where sacks are filled with material, allowing for blocks to encourage drainage and vegetation growth. This method requires increased man labor and larger amounts of filler material, as all sacks and blocks should be of the same size.

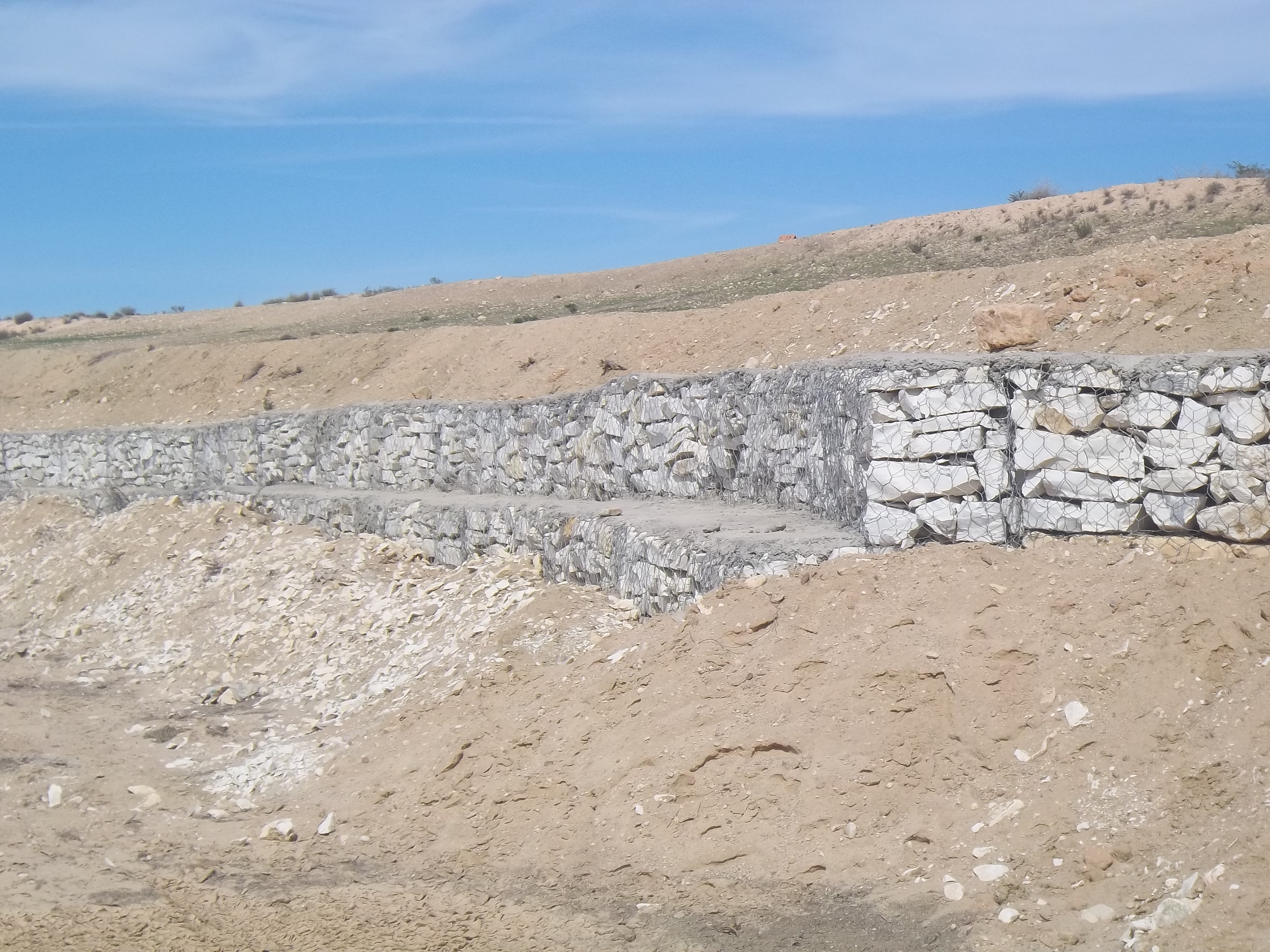
Gabion au rive

=== Gabions and mattresses ===
Gabions are stacked, rectangular wire boxes filled with stones. They are useful on steep slopes when the water is too fast for the use of a riprap technique. They are expensive and labor-intensive, as well as require periodical inspection for damage and subsequent maintenance, though they have been seen to demonstrate positive performance.

Mattress gabions are broad shallow baskets, useful on smooth riverbanks for the growth of vegetation. Tied side by side and layered next to each other on shallow surfaces, they create a blanket of protection against erosion.

Articulated concrete mattresses are used in large rivers such as the Mississippi, and consist of concrete blocks held by steel rods. Quick to use with a good reputation, they allow for complete coverage of the riverbank when properly placed. This in turn leads to a good service record. However, open spaces (8%) allow for fine material to pass through, and the spaces between the blocks may cause removal of the bank. Unfortunately, the mattresses themselves don't fit well in sharp curves, and it may be costly to remove the vegetation on the bank, which is required for placement.

=== Soil-cement ===
The exact placement of soil cement may be different depending on the slope of the bank. In rivers with high wave action, a stairstep pattern may be needed to dissipate the energy coming from the waves. In conditions with lower wave energy, cement may be 'plated' in sheets parallel to the slope. This technique cannot be used however on a steep slope. Soil cement may have negative effects in freeze/thaw conditions, but positive effects in banks with sand and vegetation, as little strength and impermeability can cause failure.

=== Vegetation ===
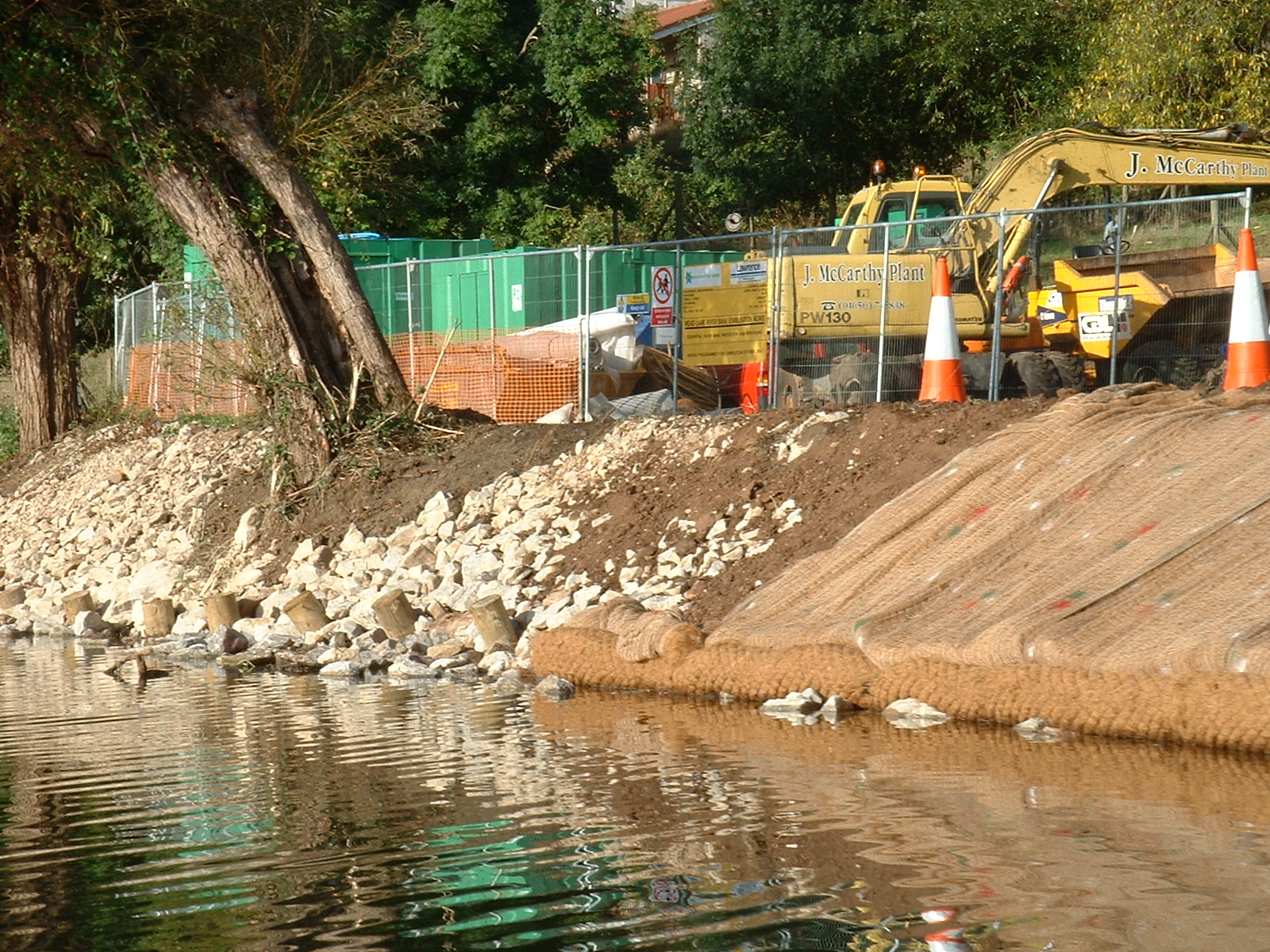
A river bank repair combining riprap rock repair at a shallow gradient with a degradable geotextile separation membrane subsequently seeded to encourage vegetation growth with a stronger planted fibre roll at the mean water level

Three main types of vegetation exist to prevent bank failure: Trees, shrubs, and grasses. Trees will provide for deep and dense root systems, increasing the stresses a river bank will accommodate. Shrubs are staked into the river bank in order to provide a protective covering against erosion, creating good plant coverage and soil stability. Cuttings may be tied together into fascines, and placed into shallow trenches parallel to the bank of the river. Typically, willows and cottonwood poles are the most useful materials, however, fiber products may also be used are then partially buried and staked in place. These bundles of cuttings create log-like structures which will root, grow, and create good plant coverage. The structures hold the soil in place and protect the stream bank from erosion. The use of vegetation to counteract erosional processes is the most labor-intensive method to employ, while also the least expensive. It also improves the habitat and is aesthetically pleasing. On steep banks, however, trees may not be able to stabilize the toe of the bank, and the weight of the tree itself may lead to failure. It is also difficult to grow vegetation in conditions such as freeze thaw. If not properly protected, wildlife and livestock may damage the vegetation.
