= Lalgola =

- census town
- Location in West Bengal, India
- Coordinates: 24.42°N 88.25°E
- Country: India
- State: West Bengal
- District: Murshidabad

Government
  - Type: Panchayat

Area
  - Total: 134 km^{2} (52 sq mi)
- Elevation: 23 m (75 ft)

Population (2001)
  - Total: 267,563
  - Density: 2,000/km^{2} (5,170/sq mi)

Languages
  - Official: Bengali, English
- Time zone: UTC+5:30 (IST)
- PIN: 742148
- Sex ratio: 955 ♀ / 1000 ♂
- Lok Sabha constituency: Jangipur
- Vidhan Sabha constituency: Lalgola
- Website: murshidabad.gov.in

Lalgola is a census town in the Lalgola CD block in the Lalbag subdivision of Murshidabad district, West Bengal. It is situated about 225 kilometres (140 mi) north of Kolkata, near the head of the Ganges delta. It is a terminal railway station on the Ranaghat-Lalgola branch line. The distance between Lalgola railway station and Krishnapur railway station is one of the shortest distance between two railway stations in India (1.7 km). It is also a border checkpoint but presently non functional.

== Backdrop ==
Lalgola is a trading hub situated near Bangladesh-India border surrounded by a number of large and small lakes (dighis). It was a settlement which came into existence after the Permanent Settlement in Bengal in 1793 by the Zamindar employed by the British East India Company. It was one of the prominent businesses hubs in then Murshidabad. Mainly agricultural products were collected and exported to different corner of the country. The remnant of the Palaces, called Rajbari, is still present. In one of these palaces Lalgola Open Air Correctional Home is established. It is the oldest open air correctional home in West Bengal which runs here since 1987.Presently Sourav Ray and Princess Sreeparna Ray are carrying the flag of this royal family.

== Geography ==
Cities, towns and locations in the Lalbag and Domkal subdivisions, Murshidabad district
M: municipal town, CT: census town, R: rural/ urban centre, H: historical place
Owing to space constraints in the small map, the actual locations in a larger map may vary slightly

=== Location ===
Lalgola is located at 24.42°N 88.25°E. It is located near the Padma River, which is the principal distributary of the Ganges, and which forms the border between India and Bangladesh in this area; thus Bangladesh bounds the town on the north and east. The average elevation is about 23 metres (75 ft)

The climate is similar to the rest of Gangetic West Bengal. The maximum temperature during the summer is about 45 °C (113 °F); the minimum during the winter is between 8 and 10 °C (46 and 50 °F).

=== Border checkpoint ===
Lalgola is a border checkpoint on the Bangladesh-India border. On the other side is Godagiri, across the Padma.

=== Area overview ===
While the Lalbag subdivision is spread across both the natural physiographic regions of the district, Rarh and Bagri, the Domkal subdivision occupies the north-eastern corner of Bagri. In the map alongside, the Ganges/ Padma River flows along the northern portion. The border with Bangladesh can be seen in the north and the east. Murshidabad district shares with Bangladesh a porous international border which is notoriously crime prone (partly shown in this map). The Ganges has a tendency to change course frequently, causing severe erosion, mostly along the southern bank. The historic city of Murshidabad, a centre of major tourist attraction, is located in this area. In 1717, when Murshid Quli Khan became Subahdar, he made Murshidabad the capital of Subah Bangla (then Bengal, Bihar and Odisha). The entire area is overwhelmingly rural with over 90% of the population living in the rural areas.

Note: The map alongside presents some of the notable locations in the subdivisions. All places marked in the map are linked in the larger full screen map.

== Civic administration ==
=== Police station ===
Lalgola police station has jurisdiction over Lalgola CD block.

=== CD block HQ ===
The headquarters of Lalgola CD block are located at Lalgola.

=== Open Air Jail ===
One notable institution in Lalgola is the Lalgola Open Air Correctional Home, established in 1987. The facility was established on the former residential estate of the Lalgola Raj family, whose descendant, Sri Birendra Narayan Roy, popularly known as Biren Roy, donated their residential palace to the government for public use.The property had previously been used to accommodate female prisoners with mental illnesses before being converted into an open-air correctional facility. The correctional home occupies approximately 100 acres (0.40 km^{2}) of land, including a mango orchad with around 1000 trees. It accommodates prisoners who meet specified eligibility criteria for transfer from conventional prisons. Eligible prisoners must have been sentenced to at least seven years of imprisonment, served at least two-thirds of their sentence, and maintained a good disciplinary record. Selection is subject to screening and a personal interview conducted by a designated board.

== Demographics ==
According to the 2011 Census of India, Lalgola had a total population of 31,698, of which 16,147 (51%) were males and 15,551 (49%) were females. Population in the age range 0–6 years was 4,290. The total number of literate persons in Lalgola was 19,797 (72.23% of the population over 6 years).

== Economy ==
As a trading town and transit point for farm products, Lalgola is visited daily by hundreds of people from the surrounding villages.

== Controversies ==
Even though Lalgola is a township surrounded by natural beauty, history, culture, and art, it also has its fare share of controversies.

1. 5 Empty Trains Set On Fire In Lalgola Amid Protest Over Citizenship Act creating tension between communities.
2. The MLA from Lalgola Abdul Aziz 's Father In Law is behind the bars for smuggling related crimes.

== Education ==
- Lalgola College was established in 2006 and began offering courses in the 2007–08 academic year, under the University of Kalyani.

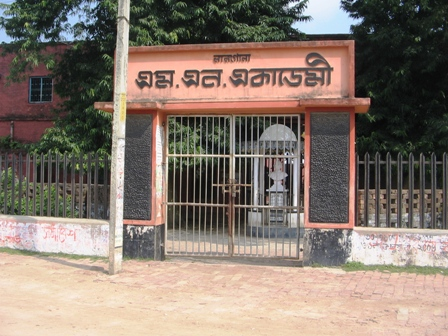
Mahesh Narayan Academy

- Mahesh Narayan Academy provides education up to class XII. It was established in 1914 by Maharaja Jogendra Narayan Ray.
- Rahmatullah High Madrasah was established in 1919. It was also patronized by Maharaja. Initially it was affiliated with Dhaka Board. It is now affiliated to West Bengal Board of Madrasa Education.
- Sekhalipur High School (H.S)
- Sailaja Memorial Girls' High School
- Laskarpur High School (HS)
- Shree Padmaprava Digamber Jain Vidyalaya
- Synergy Mission School
- Ramkrishna Vidyapith
- Chamapara Primary School.

There is a public library, Mahesh Narayan Academy Town Library, was established in 1913.

== Culture ==
Almost all major and minor Hindu and Muslim festivals are celebrated here. A popular Bengali proverb is baro mase tero parbon, translated as thirteen festivals in twelve months.

One of the main festivals is the Hindu Durga Puja, when pandals (ceremonial structures) are constructed throughout the town.

The Muslim Eid ul-Fitr and Eid al-Adha is also celebrated here. A number of local festivals are also held, including the local Flower Show and Exhibition, held every January since 1986 and also a Local Football event called Lalgola Challenge Cup which is organised by the local voluntary organization.

== Healthcare ==
There is one hospital in the town, Krishnapur Primary Health Centre. A number of local and visiting doctors are also available for consultation. A local voluntary organisation, Lalgola Sanjeeban, works in health-related fields.

== See also ==
- River bank erosion along the Ganges in Malda and Murshidabad districts
