= The Story of Lalpila =

The Story of Lalpila is an Indian folktale collected from the Baiga people by ethnologist Verrier Elwin. It is related to the cycle of the Calumniated Wife, and is classified in the international Aarne-Thompson-Uther Index as tale type ATU 707, "The Three Golden Children".

These tales refer to stories where a girl promises a king she will bear a child or children with wonderful attributes, but her jealous relatives or the king's wives plot against the babies and their mother. Many variants of the tale type are registered in India, although they comprise specific cycles in this country. In one of the cycles, the king's children's play-pretend with wooden horses leads to their father discovering the truth. Variants of the sort are recorded in Asia (India and Iran), and also in Spain and in Africa.

== Sources ==
According to Verrier Elwin, the story was sourced from the Baiga, in Taliyapani, in Mandla district. The tale was previously published in Elwin's book The Songs of the Forest, and sourced from a Baiga named Hothu, who told the tale "in a remote village of Bilaspur". In Hothu's tale, the prince's name is given as Lāl. However, Shyam Parmar republished the tale as Lal, stating that the story was the "Gondi version" of a Malwi story titled Kag-Udawanɪ, thus "identical" to other tales from North India.

== Summary ==
A childless king with six wives goes hunting in the woods and finds an emaciated-looking woman named "Queen of the Forest" atop a tree. The king and his retinue inquire about her nature: is she a devata, a rakshasa, a bhut, a Pret or human, like them? The woman climbs down the tree and eats a meal. The king takes her back to his palace and marries her. The other six queens become jealous. The Queen of the Forest is heavy with child and the king gives her a bell to ring to summon him. The Queen of the Forest gives birth to a boy that is replaced by a stone by the other queens and thrown to the buffaloes to be trampled. The animals, however, suckle the child and the queens throw the boy in a goat-shed. A woman that grazes the goats finds the boy (which she identifies as "the Forest Queen son") and she and her husband adopt him. Years later, the boy, named Lal, commissions a wooden horse to be made. He takes the boy to the river where the six queens were bathing and orders the wooden horse to drink water. The six queens mock the boy's action and he retorts about a human woman giving birth to a stone. The six queens notice it is their rival's son and return in a stunned state to the palace. The king learns of this and orders the boy to be summoned to his presence. The boy Lal tells his story and asks for the Queen of the Forest to be brought to them for a test: the woman is to be place behind a very thick screen; if she is Lal's biological mother, her milk will flow from her breasts and enter Lal's mouth. So it happens; the king recognizes him as his son, reinstates Lal's mother and banishes the six queens.

== Analysis ==
=== Tale type ===
The tale is classified in the international Aarne-Thompson-Uther Index as ATU 707, "The Three Golden Children".

According to Stith Thompson' and Jonas Balys's index of Indian tales, the tale type ATU 707 shows 44 variants across Indian sources.

=== Motifs ===
Folklorist Christine Goldberg, in the entry of the tale type in Enzyklopädie des Märchens, noted that in Indian variants of tale type 707, the children may entice their father to the truth by trying to feed a wooden horse. Likewise, researcher Noriko Mayeda and Indologist W. Norman Brown divided Indian variants of type 707 in five groups: (1) quest for wonderful items; (2) reincarnation into flowers; (3) use of wooden horses; (4) children sing a song; (5) miscellaneous.

== Variants ==
=== Asia ===
==== India ====
James Hinton Knowles collected a tale from Kashmir from a teller he identified as Pandit Ánand Ram of Renawari, Srinagar. In this variant, a childless king has three wives. Somehow, his third queen is heavy with child, and the king celebrates this happening. When the time comes, the two other queens, afraid of losing the king's favour, bribe the midwife to replace the boy for a pup and throw the boy in a carpenter's shop. The same happens to a second son. Their mother is banished from the palace and forced to beg for a living. Some time later, the boys grow up and play with a wooden horse in front of the palace, pretending to give food rice and water to the wooden animal. The king wonders about the boys' strange play, to which the boys retort that the same absurdity can be said of a woman giving birth to pups. The king takes notice of the boys' answer, summons the midwife and discovers the whole truth.

Bengali folklorist Saratchandra Mitra published a tale from North Bihar, "of the 'Wicked Queen's type'". In this tale, a Raja is already married to a Rani, but hasn't had any son yet, so he marries another. The second Rani becomes pregnant and the Rajah gives her a bell to ring if she needs something. After ringing the bell some times - both the rani and her rival -, the Raja decides to not pay attention to the bell, which leaves the pregnant rani to the jealous rani's devices. The second queen gives birth to a boy, which the first rani substitutes for a stone and casts in the river in an earthenware vessel. The same thing happens to the second queen's three other sons, born in the subsequent years. The four boys are found by a potter, who raised the boys as his own sons. When they grow up, the potter carves wooden horses for them, and instructs them to play pretend with the wooden horses in the well where the women from the village go to fetch water. A woman at the well complains to the boys about the strange pastime and they break their wares. The next time, the Raja comes to investigate the commotion and sights the four boys. The Raja summons the poor potter, who tells the whole truth, and the first rani is punished.

Sarat Chandra Mitra translated a legend, "current" in the village of Panchthupi, in the Kandi subdivision of the Murshidabad district, in Western Bengal, which he considered to have "striking similarities" to the Bihari folktale he collected. He relates this story to a goddess of children named Shashthi. In this legend, titled The Legend of the Aśoka Shashṭhî, a doe is hunted by a rajah and takes refuge in the sacred grove that belongs to a Muni. One day, the Muni urinates on a rock and secretes a bit of seminal fluid. The doe licks the rock and becomes pregnant. The doe gives birth to a human girl who is named Asoki and raised by the Muni. The rajah goes hunting the deer in the forest and reaches the sacred grove. He finds the girl Asoki and inquires the Muni, her adopted father, if he can marry her. The Muni agrees to her marriage. Asoki is taken to the rajah's palace and made his new queen, alongside the rajah's previous six queens. Asoki gives birth to seven boys in the subsequent years, who are replaced for a wooden doll each time, cast in a copper cauldron and cast adrift in the stream. The cauldrons wash on the Muni's sacred grove and he rescues them. Meanwhile, Asoki, the youngest rani, escapes the palace and goes back to her adoptive father. She meets her sons and lives with them. One day, the seven boys asks his adoptive grandfather to make wooden horses for them. They go the Rajah's seraglio, where the six queens bathe, to pretend to make the wooden horses drink water. The ranis puzzle at their play, and the boys retort that is no more absurd than a woman giving birth to wooden dolls. The six queens realize the boys are Asoki's sons and order the guards to kill them. The guards, however, disobey the orders and summon the rajah. The rajah follows the boys to the sacred grove and finds Asoki again. He is told of the whole truth and punishes the six ranis. Researcher Tony K. Stewart published a similar tale, titled Şaşțhī Who Removes Sorrow, where the goddess Sasthi helps the unfortunate queen, and the truth is revealed by her sons when they try to give water to wooden horses.

In a tale from Karnataka titled The Lucky Prince, a king has two wives, but no son yet. One day, he meets a woman named Kanaka, a Brahmin's daughter, in a temple during a festival. He marries Kanaka. One day, he has to go to war, and Kanaka gives birth to a boy in his absence. The jealous queens bribe a woman to replace the boy for a brick, and kill him, but the woman, out of mercy, places the baby in a temple's garden. A priest finds the boy, names him Kantirava and raises the boy as his own. The priest's wife gives birth to a boy, and he and Kantirava are raised as brothers. Years later, Kantirava learns of his story, and takes a wooden horse and a bamboo elephant to play near a pond. Some maidservants are drawing water from the pond and see the boy playing pretend that his wooden toys are drinking water. The women mock the boy for the absurd idea, and he retorts that so is a human woman giving birth to a brick. The maidservants report to the two co-queens, who realize that the boy must be Kanaka's son. The queens bribe some men to taka Kantirava and his adoptive brother to the outskirts of the city and kill them. The men decide to spare the boys and the duo leaves the city to go on some adventures. At the end of the tale, both Kantirava and his brother return, each married to two lovely brides. The king learns of the jealous queens' plot, proclaims Kantirava a his successor and banishes the wicked queens.

In a tale collected from the Lapcha people in Sikhim, The King of Lyang-bar and the two witch nurses, the queen of the king of Lyang-bar has two nurses who are witches in disguise. While bathing in the sea Jam-chi-chume-der, they fill their wooden bowls with flowers, while the queen plays with her golden plate. It was all a ruse to make the queen flee her home once she sets the golden plate on the water and loses it. The trio journeys to another realm, the Sachak-lat land, whose king dreamt his future wife was coming to him. He finds the three women and tests their abilities, by asking them to wash his head and brush his hair. The two witches act in a forceful manner, but the queen does it gently. They marry and she is expecting three sons. The children are born and put in a box in the water. The three children, a girl and two boys, are saved by an old fisherman and his wife. One day, they carve a wooden horse and ride it to the fountain where the queen and the witches were bathing, and taunt them that a wooden horse drinking water is the same absurd notion that a human woman gave birth to animals. Enraged, the witches feign illness and try to convince the king to kill the children and take their livers as remedy. The assassination plot is averted by the children, who each go their separate ways. Then, the elder brother tries to find their siblings, but only finds their remains. He builds a pyre to burn it, but falls in the flames, perishing also. After three days, a fir-tree springs out of the ashes with the reborn three siblings. The king's syce finds the fir-tree and reports to the king, who goes to the tree with the queen to convince the children to climb down the tree. The children agree, after their parents promise to punish the two witches.

In an Indian tale from Goa with the title Twenty Brothers and a Sister, a man gathers his seven daughters to impart them with their marriage portions, and asks them whose destiny they are born to fulfill. The six elder daughters say their father's, to the man's contentment. The seventh and youngest daughter answers that she was born to fulfill her own destiny. Offended, the man dresses his cadette in rags and forces her to work as the family's servant. Some time later, a prince passes by the man's house and the seven sisters each promise to make him a gift from their own hands, save for the seventh, who promises to bear him twenty sons and a daughter. The prince overhears the words and locates her voice: it belongs to the man's seventh daughter, who is in the kitchen. He decides to marry the seventh daughter, despite the elders' jealousy. The prince departs to deal with some business in a distant land, and promises to return to take his wife to his parents' house. In turn, the seventh sister promises that, when the children will be born, a rain of pearls will fall where he is to signal their birth. It happens thus. While the prince is away, the girl keeps working at the kitchen in her father's house and, when she is in labour, her elder sisters blindfold her and take the children as soon as they are born, placing them in boxes in the river and replacing them for frogs. As for the prince, a rain of pearls falls on the land where he is, just as his wife promised it would happen, and he returns home. However, his sisters-in-law show him the twenty-one frogs, and the prince abandons his wife in her parents' house. Back to the children, the boxes are washed near a chapel, and the chaplain rescues the children to raise them. Years later, the children play near the river bank until dusk, then return to the chaplain. One day, the twenty boys befriend a servant who gives them poisoned ladoos, which their sister warns not to eat, but they eat and die. The girl rushes to tell the chaplain about it, and the man rubs his ring and sprinkles some water on the boys to revive them. The priest then warns them never to accept any food from strangers, and gives them some wooden horses for them to play with. The children's aunts learns of their survival and plot to kill them. The boys play by the river margin where the six aunts are walking, and the women mock their play pretend by asking how can wooden horses drink water. The boys retort how a woman can bear frogs, and the aunts realize the boys are their nephews. Some time later, the children's father, the prince, pass by them again and notices how they resemble the woman he married years ago. The prince then goes to talk to the priest, who explains he found the children floating in the river. The priest then tells the prince to pay a visit to his sisters-in-law' house, prepare dinner with some poisoned dishes and invite the children, but not let them touch any meal; then, he is to bring his wife, for, if she is the mother of the children, jets of her breastmilk will spurt forth and feed them. The prince does as instructed and brings the children to their aunts' house. The prince brings the woman he married before the children and, just as the priest predicted, her milk gushes forth to feed her children. Thus, after confirming their relationship, the prince takes his wife and children with him, and punishes his sisters-in-law.

Gujarati author Jhaverchand Meghani published a tale in his work Kankavati with the tale titled Gaai Vat, which he sourced from the Umreth region of Gujarat. In this story, which is told in the occasion of the Shravan mas, a Brahmin's daughter observes religious vows of the cow, dies during this period, and is reborn as a poor koli's daughter. The girl grows up and a passing king sights her, asks her if she is demon or human, and wishes to marry her. The koli's daughter says she is no demon nor spirit, but human, and despite some reluctance, agrees to the king's proposal, but requests the king brings her some objects and gifts for a pre-marriage period eight days. After the elapsed time, the king takes the girl back home. On the road, the girl makes a religious vow to the cow, to the Goddess Basil (the tulsi plant), to the leaf of the peepal tree, to the Sun as her witness and to Mother Earth. Lastly, the king's mother is informed of her son coming with a daughter-in-law. The king asks to treat the new queen with utmost care and respect, which the kings mother does begrudgingly, by tying a panchmasi on her daughter-in-law, and holding a baby shower in the seventh month of her pregnancy. When she is ready to give birth, the king announces he has to depart and leaves his wife under his mother's care. The queen gives birth to a baby boy, but the king's envious mother tosses him in a dung hill and places a broom and rags to trick the king. In the dung hill, the cow, the tulsi plant, the peepal tree, the Sun (called Surya Narayan) and Mother Earth see the boy and take care of him. Later, the daughter of Vanijia Sutar comes by and worships the cow. The cow delivers the boy to Vanijia Sutar's daughter, whom she brings home to her family to raise. The boy grows up and asks his adoptive parents to fashion him a horse of glass from a horse of wood. His father, a carpenter, questions such an impossibility, but makes one for the boy. Some time later, the occasion of Sitla satam arrives, and the seven queens go to bathe. The boy takes the horse of glass to play pretend it is drinking water, when the queens notice the strange play. The boy retorts that so is a woman giving birth to rags and brooms. The queens report the incident to the king. Later, during the gokal aatham event, the boy repeats the question to the queens, which offends them so much they report to the king. The monarch banishes the boy from the city with a black veil and a black mare. The boy goes to find work in catering for the king's banquet. The seven queens attend the occasion, and so does the boy's kolan mother, who sits by a dung hill. When the boy goes to serve food to the kolan queen, the queen's bodice rips and her breastmilk drips, indicating her "motherly affection".

===== Stories about Goludev =====
In a 1981 article, researcher John Leavitt noticed that some Indian variants of type 707, collected from Kumaon and Garhwal, fit a ritual and religious context about a local deity named Goril, Gōryā or Gōllā.

French ethnologue Paul Ottino and researcher Aditya Malik provided the summary of a North Indian (Kumaoni or Central Himalayan) variant about the legend of Goriya (Golu Devata or Goludev): a king, Halrai or Jhalrai of the Katyuri dynasty, meets a woman named Mata Kalinga in the forest (possibly the goddess Kali herself). They marry and she gives birth to a boy, Bala Goriya. The king's previous seven co-wives replace the boy for a wooden object (or a grinding stone and grinder). In one version, the queens throw the boy under a wild cow, bury him under a salt heap and even abandon him in the woods, but he survives these attempts. The queens then lock the boy in a box and throw him in the Kali Ganga. The box is washed downstream to the Gori Ganga. The boy is found by fishermen (or by the Bhana Dhaivar) and given the name Goriya. When he is young, he has a chance encounter with his father, the king, when the boy puts his wooden horse to drink water. The king notices the absurdity of the situation and discovers the truth. Later, when Goriya (Goludev) meets his mother, a jet of her breastmilk flows from her breasts, which confirms the boy's lineage. Similar tales are found in Karnataka, Gujarat, and in Mysore.

In a tale from Himachal Pradesh titled Gol, the God-King, a king of Kumaon has seven wives, but no children. His ministers advise him to marry an eighth wife. His newest wife becomes pregnant, to the king's contentment and the cowives' jealousy. As soon as the king's son is born, the cowives replace him for a stone and try to have the boy killed: first they cast it to a snake then to an elephant, but both animals protect the little prince. Finally they cast the boy in a box in the river. The boy is found by a fisherman who names him Gulel. One day, the seven queens and their maidservant (the disgraced eighth queen) go to the river to fill their pitchers, but the boy Gulel, later Gol, shoots an arrow to break their pitchers. The next day, Gol brings his wooden horse to drink water and breaks the queens' pitchers, but fills the maidservant's one. The queens bring their complaint to the king, who inquires the boy about his actions. Gol retorts that a wooden horse can drink water from a river just as it is possible for a woman to give birth to a stone. The maidservant embraces Gol, recognizing him as her son. The king reunites with his family and banishes the seven queens to a far-off portion of the palace as per his son's merciful request.

In another similar tale from Kumaon, published by author Taradutt Gairola with the title Goril, in the ancient state of Champawatgarh, lives prince Jhalu Rai. He has seven queens, but has not fathered a son yet. One day, during a hunt in the forest, he orders his servants to find him water. The servants find a water tank near a temple, and a goddess comes outside to inquire the men about their presence. The men answer that their king wants some water, but the goddess denies their request. Jhalu Rai comes to the temple to attack it, but, on seeing the goddess, named Kalindra, falls in love with her at once and takes her to his palace as his eighth queen. Kalindra becomes pregnant and is placed by the other jealous co-queens in a dark room. From her womb, her son, Goril, asks to be born from her left eye, just like Krishna was born of his mother Devaki. Goril is born, with twenty arms and riding a wooden horse. The other co-queens lock him up in a golden casket and throw him in the river, while they put a stone in his place. While being washed downstream, Goril calls out for his father Jhalu Rai from inside the casket. The prince hears his son's plea and rescues him. After he learns of the co-queens' treachery, he executes them and declares Goril as his successor.

==== Iran ====
In a tale collected from a teller in Isfahan and published by professor Mahomed-Nuri Osmanovich Osmanov with the title "Мельник с золотыми кудрями" ("The Boy with Golden Curls"), three sisters are talking through the night, and the youngest says she will give birth to a boy with golden curls she will name Kazolzari: when he cries, diamonds and pearls will appear; when he laughs, roses will fall from his mouth, and with every step he takes, he leaves behind a trail of bars of gold and silver. The shah listens to their conversation and brings them all to his presence; he marries the sisters off to the vizier and a courtier, and the youngest becomes his queen. The queen's jealous sisters replace the boy for a puppy, and throws him in the water. The boy is saved by an elderly couple who owns a bathhouse. His aunts feign illness and send him to a get milk from a lioness, a mare that gave birth to 40 foals, and a self-swinging cradle. At the end of the tale, Kazolzari takes a wooden horse to eat hay in front of the king, who notices the absurdity of the situation. The youth answers that it is no more absurd with a human woman giving birth to a puppy.

==== South Asia ====
Author Charles Swynnerton published a tale from the Upper Indus with the title Lál Bádsháh, the Red King, or, The Two Little Princesses. In this tale, a king loses his wife. He remarries another woman, who begins mistreating his two daughters. The two princesses go to their mother's grave to pray, and finds a dish with food in it. The stepmother's cat reports the situation to it owner. The stepmother feign illness and asks her husband to spread the bones of the dead queen all over the earth. A tree sprouts on the queen's grave and feeds her daughters with fruits. The cat also reports this to its owner, who wishes for the tree to be chopped down and burnt. The stepmother's persecution comes to a head when the king abandons his daughters in the mountains and returns alone to the kingdom. The two princesses find temporary shelter with an ogress, who directs them to another glade. The girls find a large tree with shade; the elder sister climbs the tree and sews, while the younger ventures into the forest to find food for them. They also exchange life tokens to warn the other of danger: the elder's is a flower, while the younger's is a needle. One day, a king named Lál Bádsháh goes with his retinue to the same forest. After a mishap with cooking a partridge, Lál Bádsháh discovers the elder princess and takes her to the city to marry her. She goes with the king, but leaves a trail of mustard seeds for her sister to find. The younger sister returns to the tree and, not seeing her elder, follows the trail of mustard seeds to the city. She build a house on the outskirts of town and learns of her sister's fate: she has become another wife of Lál Bádsháh; gave birth to a son, but the other co-wives replace him for a basket of charcoal. The boy's aunt rescues and raises the boy. Some years later, she gives her nephew a wooden horse, and advises him to say to the toy to drink water. The boy plays in front on the king, who mocks the boy's playtime. The second time, the boy retorts that if a wooden horse drinking water is a silly notion, so is a woman giving birth to a basket of charcoal.

==== Yaghnobi people ====
In an untitled tale in the Yaghnobi language published by Russian orientalists Mikhail Stepanovich Andreev and Elena Mikhailovna Peshchereva, a poor man has three daughters. One day, a vizier's son sends a matchmaker to court the three sisters: the elder two offer to marry the vizier's son, but he chooses the youngest. They marry and nine months later, the third sister gives birth to twins, a boy and a girl, whom the aunts replace for puppies. The twins are raised by an aunt. One day, when the male twin is old enough, he carves a horse out of wood, and takes it to drink water in front of his father. The vizier's son questions the boy the reason for giving water to a wooden horse, and the boy replies with his own question: if he can believe a woman can give birth to puppies. Moved by the boy's answer, he tells his wife about it, and the woman tells him to go ask the boy's parentage. The man does so and the boy answers he is his son, taken by the jealous aunts and raised elsewhere. With this, the man executes his sisters-in-law and welcomes his twin children back.

=== Europe ===
==== Spain ====
In a tale collected from an informant in Casares, Spain, with the title Los hijos de palo ("The Wooden Children"), three tailor sisters talk to each other about marrying the king, the youngest promising to bear wise twin boys, each with a star on the front. A king's spy overhears their conversation and reports back to the king. The king summons the girl and marries her. War breaks out, and the king has to leave his pregnant wife to fight in the war. The queen calls her sisters to keep her company while the king is away. When the queen gives birth to her twins, her sisters, jealous of her sister, take the boys and replace them for wooden images. The twins are cast into the sea in a box, but are saved by an old woman. She raises the boys and fashions them little wooden donkeys for them to play with. The twins go to the front of the king castle and play pretend that their wooden donkeys are eating grass. The king mocks their strange behaviour, and the twins retort that the same could be said of believing in the idea that a human woman can give birth to wooden images.

=== Africa ===
==== West Africa ====
In the Portuguese Folktale Catalogue, Portuguese scholar Isabel Cárdigos located one Portuguese language variant from Guiné of tale type ATU 707, Portuguese: Os Três Meninos com uma Estrelinha na Testa, lit. 'The three boys with a little star on the front'. In this tale, the royal children give wooden horses water to drink, and the king's curiosity is piqued.

In the first addendum to Cárdigos's Catalogue, Portuguese researcher Paulo Jorge Correia lists two Cape Verdian variants and two from Guiné-Bissau of type ATU 707, Portuguese: Os Três Meninos com uma Estrela na Testa, lit. 'The three boys with a star on the front'. In these tales, the royal children give wooden horses water to drink and later reveal the truth to their father, the king.

== See also ==
- Golu Devata

== Bibliography ==
- Leavitt, John (1981). "Himalayan Versions of "The Three Golden Sons": The Effect of Context on Narrative Content". Journal of Indian Folkloristics (4): 1–17.
