= Bhagirathpur =

- Village
- Location in West Bengal, India Bhagirathpur (India)
- Coordinates: 24.088411°N 88.494692°E
- Country: India
- State: West Bengal
- District: Murshidabad
- Elevation: 22 m (72 ft)

Population (2011)
  - Total: 10,125

Languages
  - Official: Bengali, English
- Time zone: UTC+5:30 (IST)
- PIN: 742406 (Domkal)
- Telephone/STD code: 03471
- Lok Sabha constituency: Murshidabad
- Vidhan Sabha constituency: Domkal
- Website: murshidabad.gov.in

Bhagirathpur is a village and a gram panchayat in the Domkal CD block in the Domkol subdivision of Murshidabad district in the state of West Bengal, India.

== Geography ==
Cities, towns and locations in the Lalbag and Domkal subdivisions, Murshidabad district
M: municipal town, CT: census town, R: rural/ urban centre, H: historical place
Owing to space constraints in the small map, the actual locations in a larger map may vary slightly

=== Location ===
Bhgirathpur is located at .088411°N 88.494692°E.

Bhagirathpur is 10 km from Domkal. It is on the banks of the Jalangi.

Villages in Bhagirathpur gram panchayat are: Bhagirathpur, Char Bhagirathpur, Char Kaludiar, Char Salikadaha, Char Sibnagar, Char Sundalpur and Sibnagar Laskarpur.

=== Area overview ===
While the Lalbag subdivision is spread across both the natural physiographic regions of the district, Rarh and Bagri, the Domkal subdivision occupies the north-eastern corner of Bagri. In the map alongside, the Ganges/ Padma River flows along the northern portion. The border with Bangladesh can be seen in the north and the east. Murshidabad district shares with Bangladesh a porous international border which is notoriously crime prone (partly shown in this map). The Ganges has a tendency to change course frequently, causing severe erosion, mostly along the southern bank. The historic city of Murshidabad, a centre of major tourist attraction, is located in this area. In 1717, when Murshid Quli Khan became Subahdar, he made Murshidabad the capital of Subah Bangla (then Bengal, Bihar and Odisha). The entire area is overwhelmingly rural with over 90% of the population living in the rural areas.

Note: The map alongside presents some of the notable locations in the subdivisions. All places marked in the map are linked in the larger full screen map.

== Demographics ==
According to the 2011 Census of India, Bhagirathpur had a total population of 10,125, of which 5,147 (51%) were males and 4,978 (49%) were females. Population in the age range 0–6 years was 1,081. The total number of literate persons in Bhagirathpur was 6,792 (75.10% of the population over 6 years).

== Education ==
Bhagirathpur High School is a Bengali medium co-educational higher secondary school established in 1896. It has a library of 3,500 books and has 15 computers.

== Healthcare ==
Bhagirathpur Block Primary Health Centre at Bhagirathpur functions with 10 beds.
