= Jafikul Islam =

Indian politician

Jafikul Islam - জাফিকুল ইসলাম
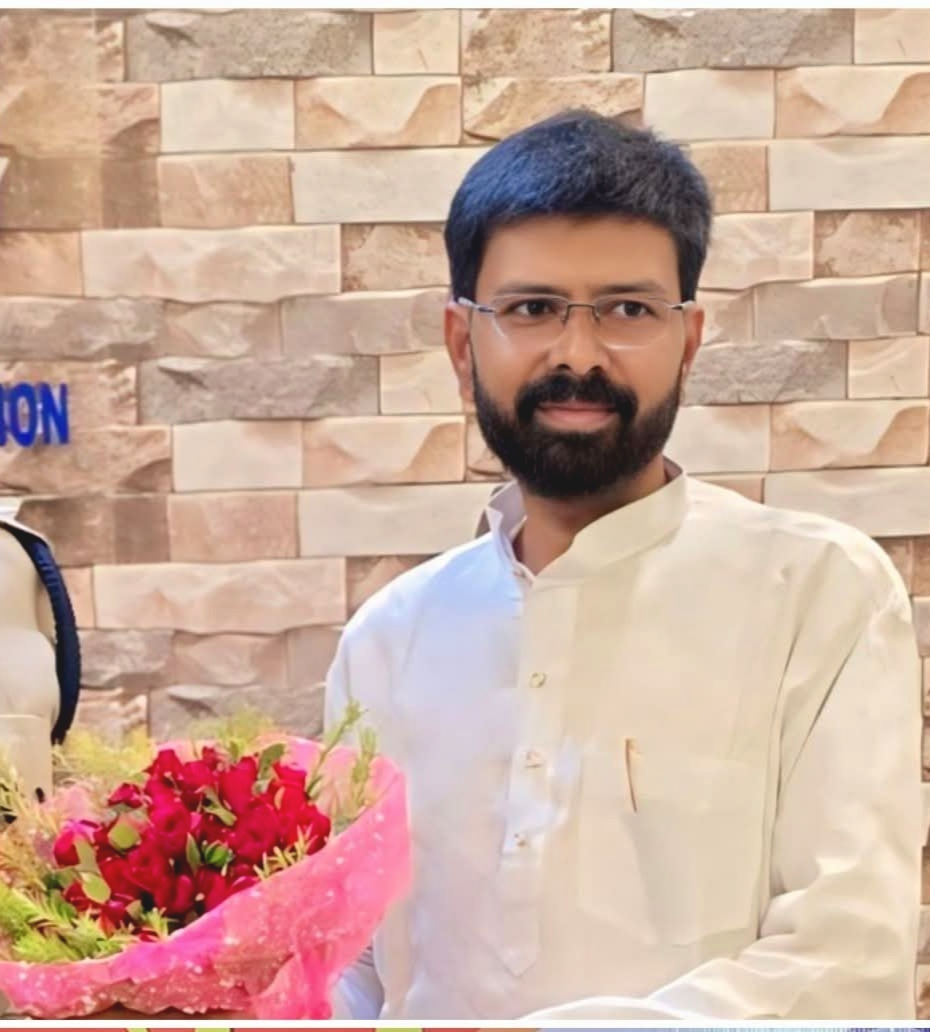
- Former M.L.A of Domkal

Member of the West Bengal Legislative Assembly
- In office 2 May 2021 – 4 September 2025
- Preceded by: Anisur Rahman
- Succeeded by: Md. Mostafijur Rahaman
- Constituency: Domkal

Personal details
- Died: September 4, 2025
- Party: All India Trinamool Congress
- Profession: Politician

Jafikul Islam, was an Indian politician member of Trinamool Congress. He was an MLA, elected from the Domkal constituency in the 2021 West Bengal Legislative Assembly election. Jafikul Islam died on 4 September 2025.
