= Domkal (community development block) =

- Community development block
- Coordinates: 24.1411927°N 88.5286903°E
- Country: India
- State: West Bengal
- District: Murshidabad

Government
  - Type: Federal democracy

Area
  - Total: 304.27 km^{2} (117.48 sq mi)
- Elevation: 22 m (72 ft)

Population (2011)
  - Total: 363,976
  - Density: 1,196.2/km^{2} (3,098.2/sq mi)

Languages
  - Official: Bengali, English

Literacy
  - Literacy (2011): 55.89%
- Time zone: UTC+5:30 (IST)
- PIN: 742303 (Domkal)
- Telephone/STD code: 03471
- ISO 3166 code: IN-WB
- Vehicle registration: WB-57, WB-58
- Lok Sabha constituency: Mushidabad
- Vidhan Sabha constituency: Domkal, Raninagar
- Website: murshidabad.gov.in

Domkal is a community development block that forms an administrative division in the Domkol subdivision of Murshidabad district in the Indian state of West Bengal.

== Geography ==
Domkal is located at 24°08′28″N 88°31′43″E

Domkal CD block lies in the Raninagar plain at the north-eastern corner of the Bagri region in Murshidabad district. The Bhagirathi River splits the district into two natural physiographic regions – Rarh on the west and Bagri on the east. The Padma River separates Murshidabad district from Malda district and Chapai Nawabganj and Rajshahi districts of Bangladesh in the north. The Raninagar plain lies between the Jalangi and Bhairab rivers. It is a low-lying area and is characterized by the nature of inundation along with many swamps

Domkal CD block is bounded by Raninagar I and Raninagar II CD blocks in the north, Jalangi CD block in the east, Karimpur I CD block, in Nadia district, in the south and Hariharpara CD block in the west.

The Bagri or the eastern part of the district is a low lying alluvial plain with the shape of an isosceles triangle. The Ganges/Padma and the Bhagirathi form the two equal sides; the Jalangi forms the entire base; other offshoots of the Ganges meander within the area. It is liable to flooding by the Bhagirathi and other rivers. The main rivers of this region are Bhairab, Jalangi, Chhoto Bhairab, Sialmari and Gobra Nala. All these rivers are distributaries of the main branch of the Ganges. The rivers are in their decaying stages.

A major problem is river bank erosion. As of 2013, an estimated 2.4 million people reside along the banks of the Ganges alone in Murshidabad district.

Domkal CD block has an area of 305.19 km^{2}. It has 1 panchayat samity, 13 gram panchayats, 249 gram sansads (village councils), 87 mouzas and 77 inhabited villages. Domkal police station serves this block. Headquarters of this CD block is at Domkal.

Gram panchayats of Domkal block/ panchayat samiti are: Azimganjgola, Bhagirathpur, Dhulauri, Domkal, Garaimari, Ghoramara, Goribpur, Jitpur, Juginda, Juranpur, Madhurkul, Raipur and Sarangpur.

== Demographics ==
=== Population ===
According to the 2011 Census of India, Domkal CD block had a total population of 363,976, all of which were rural. There were 186,182 (51%) males and 177,794 (49%) females. Population in the age range 0–6 years numbered 45,641. Scheduled Castes numbered 9,515 (2.61%) and Scheduled Tribes numbered 1,219 (0.33%).

As per 2001 census, Domkal block has a total population of 311,683, out of which 160,562 were males and 151,121 were females. Domkal block registered a population growth of 23.03 per cent during the 1991-2001 decade. Decadal growth for the district was 23.70 per cent. Decadal growth in West Bengal was 17.84 per cent.

The decadal growth of population in Domkal CD block in 2001-2011 was 16.78%.

The decadal growth rate of population in Murshidabad district was as follows: 33.5% in 1951–61, 28.6% in 1961–71, 25.5% in 1971–81, 28.2% in 1981–91, 23.8% in 1991-2001 and 21.1% in 2001–11. The decadal growth rate for West Bengal in 2001-11 was 13.93%.

There are reports of Bangladeshi infiltrators entering Murshidabad district.

=== Villages ===
Large villages in the Domkal CD block were (2011 population figure in brackets): Gokulpur Gobindapur (8,270), Bagharpur Ramna (7,525), Jitpur (11,016), Radhakantapur (4,041), Dhulauri (6.959), Jot Kamal (6,170), Par Raghunathpur (5,802), Taraf Rasulpurpatnipara (19,958), Raypur (13,285), Bhatsala (5,720), Ramna Etbarnagar Basantapur (8,409), Lakshminathpur (10,122), Bhagirathpur (10,125), Sibnagar Laskarpur (15,887), Sabdalpur (4,948), Garibpur (12,788), Chandpur (4,879), Pardiar (5,097), Juranpur (5,743), Kusbaria (5,153), Juginda (13,891), Aminabad (10,496), Mamenpur (10,187), Garaimari (29,260), Kuchemora (6,917), Sahadiar (5,275) and Kupila (8,922).

=== Literacy ===
As per the 2011 census, the total number of literate persons in the Domkal CD block was 203,429 (63.90% of the population over 6 years) out of which males numbered 105,034 (64.47% of the male population over 6 years) and females numbered 98,395 (63.31% of the female population over 6 years). The gender disparity (the difference between female and male literacy rates) was 1.16%.

See also – List of West Bengal districts ranked by literacy rate

Literacy in CD blocks of
Murshidabad district
Jangipur subdivision
Farakka – 59.75%
Samserganj – 54.98%
Suti I – 58.40%
Suti II – 55.23%
Raghunathganj I – 64.49%
Raghunathganj II – 61.17%
Sagardighi – 65.27%
Lalbag subdivision
Murshidabad-Jiaganj – 69.14%
Bhagawangola I - 57.22%
Bhagawangola II – 53.48%
Lalgola– 64.32%
Nabagram – 70.83%
Sadar subdivision
Berhampore – 73.51%
Beldanga I – 70.06%
Beldanga II – 67.86%
Hariharpara – 69.20%
Naoda – 66.09%
Kandi subdivision
Kandi – 65.13%
Khargram – 63.56%
Burwan – 68.96%
Bharatpur I – 62.93%
Bharatpur II – 66.07%
Domkol subdivision
Domkal – 55.89%
Raninagar I – 57.81%
Raninagar II – 54.81%
Jalangi – 58.73%
Source: 2011 Census: CD Block Wise
Primary Census Abstract Data

=== Language and religion ===
Religion in Domkal CD block (2011)
Islam	89.69%
Hinduism	10.16%
Other or not stated	0.15%

In the 2011 census, in Domkal CD block, Muslims numbered 326,459 and formed 89.69% of the population, Hindus numbered 36,972 and formed 10.16% of the population. Others numbered 545 and formed 0.15% of the population. In Domkal CD block while the proportion of Muslims increased from 87.24% in 1991 to 88.58% in 2001, the proportion of Hindus declined from 12.72% in 1991 to 11.31% in 2001.

Murshidabad district had 4,707,573 Muslims who formed 66.27% of the population, 2,359,061 Hindus who formed 33.21% of the population, and 37, 173 persons belonging to other religions who formed 0.52% of the population, in the 2011 census. While the proportion of Muslim population in the district increased from 61.40% in 1991 to 63.67% in 2001, the proportion of Hindu population declined from 38.39% in 1991 to 35.92% in 2001.

Murshidabad was the only Muslim majority district in West Bengal at the time of partition of India in 1947. The proportion of Muslims in the population of Murshidabad district in 1951 was 55.24%. The Radcliffe Line had placed Muslim majority Murshidabad in India and the Hindu majority Khulna in Pakistan, in order to maintain the integrity of the Ganges river system In India.

Bengali is the predominant language, spoken by 99.89% of the population.

== Rural poverty ==
As per the Human Development Report 2004 for West Bengal, the rural poverty ratio in Murshidabad district was 46.12%. Purulia, Bankura and Birbhum districts had higher rural poverty ratios. These estimates were based on Central Sample data of NSS 55th round 1999–2000.

== Economy ==
=== Livelihood ===
In the Domkal CD block in 2011, amongst the class of total workers, cultivators numbered 29,015 and formed 22.62%, agricultural labourers numbered 54,090 and formed 42.16%, household industry workers numbered 8,900 and formed 6.94% and other workers numbered 36,293 and formed 28.29%.

=== Infrastructure ===
There are 77 inhabited villages in the Domkal CD block. 100% villages have power supply and drinking water supply. 12 villages (15.58%) have post offices. 72 villages (94.51%) have telephones (including landlines, public call offices and mobile phones). 42 villages (54.55%) have a pucca approach road and 37 villages (48.05%) have transport communication (includes bus service, rail facility and navigable waterways). 22 villages (28.57%) have agricultural credit societies and 17 villages (22.08%) have banks.

=== Agriculture ===
Persons engaged in agriculture
in Domkal CD block
1. Bargadars (7.04%)
2. Patta holders (10.1%)
3. Small farmers (4.63%)
4. Marginal farmers (30.7%)
5. Agricultural labourers (47.6%)

From 1977 onwards major land reforms took place in West Bengal. Land in excess of land ceiling was acquired and distributed amongst the peasants. Following land reforms land ownership pattern has undergone transformation. In 2013–14, persons engaged in agriculture in Domkal CD block could be classified as follows: bargadars 8,005 (7.04%), patta (document) holders 11,453 (10.08%), small farmers (possessing land between 1 and 2 hectares) 5,262 (4.63%), marginal farmers (possessing land up to 1 hectare) 34,855 (30.66%) and agricultural labourers 54,090 (47.59%).

Domkal CD block had 107 fertiliser depots, 2 seed stores and 70 fair price shops in 2013–14.

In 2013–14, Domkal CD block produced 2,511 tonnes of Aman paddy, the main winter crop from 1,081 hectares, 9,948 tonnes of Boro paddy (spring crop) from 3,029 hectares, 39,749 tonnes of wheat from 14,146 hectares, 313,768 tonnes of jute from 20,548 hectares, 11,079 tonnes of potatoes from 381 hectares and 3,295 tonnes of sugar cane from 59 hectares. It also produced pulses and oilseeds.

In 2013–14, the total area irrigated in Domkal CD block was 17.427 hectares, out of which 2,193 hectares were irrigated with tank water, 1,734 hectares by deep tube well and 13,500 hectares by other means.

=== Silk and handicrafts ===
Murshidabad is famous for its silk industry since the Middle Ages. There are three distinct categories in this industry, namely (i) Mulberry cultivation and silkworm rearing (ii) Peeling of raw silk (iii) Weaving of silk fabrics.

Ivory carving is an important cottage industry from the era of the Nawabs. The main areas where this industry has flourished are Khagra and Jiaganj. 99% of ivory craft production is exported. In more recent years sandalwood etching has become more popular than ivory carving. Bell metal and Brass utensils are manufactured in large quantities at Khagra, Berhampore, Kandi and Jangipur. Beedi making has flourished in the Jangipur subdivision.

=== Banking ===
In 2013–14, Domkal CD block had offices of 7 commercial banks and 7 gramin banks.

=== Backward Regions Grant Fund ===
Murshidabad district is listed as a backward region and receives financial support from the Backward Regions Grant Fund. The fund, created by the Government of India, is designed to redress regional imbalances in development. As of 2012, 272 districts across the country were listed under this scheme. The list includes 11 districts of West Bengal.

== Transport ==
Domkal CD block has 9 originating/ terminating bus routes. The nearest railway station is 20 km from the CD block headquarters.

Baharampur-Lalgola Road and Rabindra Sarani-Siraj-ud-daulah Road pass through this block.

State Highway 11 running from Mohammad Bazar (in Birbhum district) to Ranaghat (in Nadia district) passes through this CD block.

== Education ==
In 2013–14, Domkal CD block had 144 primary schools with 18,155 students, 10 middle schools with 2,374 students, 9 high schools with 7,249 students and 18 higher secondary schools with 31,247 students. Domkal CD block had 1 general college with 1,755 students, 6 technical/ professional institutions with 1,929 students and 500 institutions for special and non-formal education with 21,424 students.

Dumkal College was established in 1999 at Domkal. Affiliated with the University of Kalyani, it offers honours courses in Bengali, English, history, political science, philosophy, geography, physics, chemistry, mathematics, computer science and B Com.

Domkal Girls’ College was established in 2011 at Domkal, Affiliated with the University of Kalyani, it offers honours courses in Bengali, English, history, education and political science.

In Domkal CD block, amongst the 77 inhabited villages, 4 villages do not have a school, 49 villages have more than 1 primary school, 40 villages have at least 1 primary and 1 middle school and 28 villages had at least 1 middle and 1 secondary school.

== Healthcare ==
In 2014, Domkal CD block had 1 hospital, 1 block primary health centre, 3 primary health centres and 14 private nursing homes with total 116 beds and 28 doctors (excluding private bodies). It had 46 family welfare subcentres. 23,377 patients were treated indoor and 315,029 patients were treated outdoor in the hospitals, health centres and subcentres of the CD Block.

Domkal CD block has Domkal Subdivisional Hospital at Domkal (with 68 beds), Bhagirathpur Block Primary Health Centre at Bhagirathpur (with 10 beds), Garaimari Primary Health Centre (with 4 beds) and Jitpur PHC (with 10 beds).

Domkal CD block is one of the areas of Murshidabad district where ground water is affected by a high level of arsenic contamination. The WHO guideline for arsenic in drinking water is 10 mg/ litre, and the Indian Standard value is 50 mg/ litre. All but one of the 26 blocks of Murshidabad district have arsenic contamination above the WHO level, all but two of the blocks have arsenic concentration above the Indian Standard value and 17 blocks have arsenic concentration above 300 mg/litre. The maximum concentration in Domkal CD Block is 1,300 mg/litre.
