= Ashis Marjit =

Indian politician

Member of the West Bengal Legislative Assembly
- In office 2011 – 4 May 2026
- Preceded by: Manabendranath Saha
- Succeeded by: Mitali Mal
- Constituency: Khargram

Personal details
- Party: Trinamool Congress
- Profession: Politician

Ashis Marjit is an Indian politician from Trinamool Congress. In May 2021, he was elected as the member of the West Bengal Legislative Assembly from Khargram Assembly constituency.

== Early life and education ==
Marjit is from Khargram, Murshidabad. His father's name is Sambhunath Marjit. He has passed H.S from H.S.Gurapasla S.K.Siksha Niketan in 1992.

== Career ==
He has been elected as the member of the West Bengal Legislative Assembly from Khargram Assembly constituency. He won the election. He was defeated by Mitali Mal of the Bharatiya Janata Party in the 2026 election.
