= Kandi subdivision =

- Subdivision
- Interactive map of Kandi subdivision
- Coordinates: 23.95°N 88.03°E
- Country: India
- State: West Bengal
- District: Murshidabad
- Headquarters: Kandi

Area
  - Total: 1,200.76 km^{2} (463.62 sq mi)

Population
  - Total: 1,155,645
  - Density: 962.428/km^{2} (2,492.68/sq mi)

Languages
  - Official: Bengali, English
- Time zone: UTC+5:30 (IST)
- ISO 3166 code: ISO 3166-2:IN
- Website: wb.gov.in

Kandi subdivision is an administrative subdivision of Murshidabad district in the state of West Bengal, India.

== Overview ==
The Bhagirathi River splits the district into two natural physiographic regions – Rarh on the west and Bagri on the east. Kandi subdivision lies in the Mayurakshi Dwaraka plain in the south-eastern corner of the Rarh region. The Rarh region is undulating and contains mostly clay and lateritic clay based soil.

== Geography ==
=== Subdivisions ===
Murshidabad district is divided into the following administrative subdivisions:

Subdivision	Headquarters	Area km^{2}	Population (2011)	Rural population % (2011)	Urban population % (2011)
Barhampur	Baharampur	1,195.57	1,725,525	80.15	19.85
Kandi	Kandi	1,200.76	1,155,645	93.21	6.79
Jangipur	Jangipur	1,097.82	1,972,308	56.43	43.57
Lalbag	Murshidabad	1019.10	1,253,886	92.36	7.64
Domkol	Domkol	837.88	996,443	97.55	2.45
Murshidabad district		5,324.00	7,103,807	80.28	19.72

Cities, towns and locations in the Berhampore and Kandi subdivisions, Murshidabad district
M: municipal town, CT: census town, R: rural/ urban centre, H: historical centres
Owing to space constraints in the small map, the actual locations in a larger map may vary slightly

=== Administrative units ===
Kandi subdivision has 5 police stations, 5 community development blocks, 5 panchayat samitis, 50 gram panchayats, 552 mouzas, 510 inhabited villages, 1 municipality and 1 census town. The municipality is: Kandi. The census town is: Salar. The subdivision has its headquarters at Kandi, Murshidabad.

=== Police stations ===
Police stations in Kandi subdivision have the following features and jurisdiction:

Police station	Area covered km^{2}	Municipal town	CD Block
Kandi	n/a	Kandi	Kandi
Khargram	n/a	-	Khargram
Burwan	n/a	-	Burwan
Bharatapur	n/a	-	Bharatpur I
Salar	n/a	-	Bharatpur II

=== Gram Panchayats ===
The subdivision contains 50 gram panchayats under 5 community development blocks:

- Kandi CD Block - Andulia, Hizole, Kumarsanda, Purandarpur, Gokarna-I, Jashahari Anukha–I, Mahalandi–I, Gokarna–II, Jashahari Anukha–II and Mahalandi–II.
- Khargram CD Block - Eroali, Jaipur, Kirtipur, Padamkandi, Balia, Jhilli, Mahisar, Parulia, Indrani, Khargram, Margram and Sadal.
- Burwan CD Block - Burwan–I, Kalyanpur–II, Panchthupi, Sundarpur, Burwan–II, Kharjuna, Sabaldaha, Biprasekhar, Kuli, Sabalpur, Kalyanpur–I, Kurunnorun and Sahora.
- Bharatpur I CD Block - Alugram, Bharatpur, Gundiria, Sijgram, Amlai, Gadda, Jajan and Talgram.
- Bharatpur II CD Block - Kagram, Salar, Simulia, Tenya–Baidyapur, Malihati, Salu and Talibpur.

=== Blocks ===
Community development blocks in Kandi subdivision are:

CD Block	Headquarters	Area km^{2}	Population (2011)	SC %	ST %	Muslims %	Hindus %	Decadal Growth Rate 2001-2011 %	Literacy rate %	Census Towns
Kandi	Kandi	227.48	220,145	16.29	1.54	60.65	38.82	14.01	65.13	-
Khargram	Nagar	318.45	272,332	21.93	0.89	54.22	45.43	16.42	63.56	-
Burwan	Gram Salkia	299.66	257,466	24.51	1.15	43.06	56.76	14.74	68.96	-
Bharatpur I	Bharatpur	183.72	172,702	13.82	0.25	57.45	42.39	14.45	62.93	-
Bharatpur II	Salar	158.50	176,368	18.70	0.11	57.71	42.16	17.47	66.07	1

== Economy ==
=== Infrastructure ===
All inhabited villages in Murshidabad district have power supply.

See the individual block pages for more information about the infrastructure available.

=== Agriculture ===
Murshidabad is a predominantly agricultural district. A majority of the population depends on agriculture for a living. The land is fertile. The eastern portion of the Bhagirathi, an alluvial tract, is very fertile for growing Aus paddy, jute and rabi crops. The Kalantar area in the south-eastern portion of the district, is a low lying area with stiff dark clay and supports mainly the cultivation of Aman paddy. The west flank of the Bhagirathi is a lateritic tract intersected by numerous bils and old riverbeds. It supports the cultivation of Aman paddy, sugar cane and mulberry.

Given below is an overview of the agricultural production (all data in tonnes) for Kandi subdivision, other subdivisions and the Murshidabad district, with data for the year 2013-14.

CD Block/ Subdivision	Rice	Wheat	Jute	Pulses	Oil seeds	Potatoes	Sugarcane
Kandi	140,043	608	3,555	1,411	2,872	8,300	4,265
Khargram	124,132	125	41	101	3,609	29,960	80,757
Burwan	42,272	2,314	445	1,486	1,973	37,401	8,196
Bharatpur I	120,191	966	-	1,809	782	4,613	12,060
Bharatpur II	60,569	144	2,145	11	119	5,612	1,368
Kandi subdivision	487,207	4,157	6,186	4,818	9,355	85,886	106,646
Barhampur subdivision	268,587	109,091	914,791	5,758	35,315	39,914	160,221
Jangipur subdivision	207,472	45,261	207,425	9,374	12,375	38,197	52,344
Lalbag subdivision	68,034	20,304	427,450	7,809	22,592	40,997	3,295
Domkol subdivision	80,899	109,518	730,393	16,755	33,410	117,082	25,023
Murshidabad district	1,112,199	288,331	2,286,245	44,514	113,047	322.076	347,529

== Education ==
Murshidabad district had a literacy rate of 66.59% (for population of 7 years and above) as per the census of India 2011. Barhampur subdivision had a literacy rate of 72.60%, Kandi subdivision 66.28%, Jangipur subdivision 60.95%, Lalbag subdivision 68.00% and Domkal subdivision 68.35%. Given in the table below is a comprehensive picture of the education scenario in Murshidabad district for the year 2013-14:

Subdivision	Primary School		Middle School		High School		Higher Secondary School		General College, Univ		Technical / Professional Instt		Non-formal Education	
Subdivision	Institution	Student	Institution	Student	Institution	Student	Institution	Student	Institution	Student	Institution	Student	Institution	Student
Barhampur	728	88,371	107	13,364	37	31,214	92	162,613	7	17,418	11	2,796	2,278	100,164
Kandi	672	66,030	105	11,248	46	32,752	61	87,482	5	7,830	3	400	1,717	74,370
Jangipur	747	144,416	72	14,159	25	30,004	76	194,025	5	15,335	5	500	2,793	160,236
Lalbag	601	72,429	74	8,997	24	22,174	66	120,454	5	13,088	7	759	2,082	93,891
Domkol	432	52,177	73	11,791	22	23,201	47	86,672	3	7,211	11	2,457	1,612	74,330
Murshidabad district	3,180	423,423	431	59,559	154	139,345	342	651,246	25	60,882	37	6,912	10,482	502,991

Note: Primary schools include junior basic schools; middle schools, high schools and higher secondary schools include madrasahs; technical schools include junior technical schools, junior government polytechnics, industrial technical institutes, industrial training centres, nursing training institutes etc.; technical and professional colleges include engineering colleges, medical colleges, para-medical institutes, management colleges, teachers training and nursing training colleges, law colleges, art colleges, music colleges etc. Special and non-formal education centres include sishu siksha kendras, madhyamik siksha kendras, centres of Rabindra mukta vidyalaya, recognised Sanskrit tols, institutions for the blind and other handicapped persons, Anganwadi centres, reformatory schools etc. The following institutions are located in Kandi subdivision:

- Kandi Raj College was established in 1950 by the Kandi Raj family at Kandi.
- Raja Birendra Chandra College was established in 1965 at Kandi. It was earlier known as Kandi Raj College of Commerce.
- Panchthupi Haripada Gouribala College was established in 1996 at Panchthupi.
- Sunil Dhar Memorial B.P.Ed. College, a college for physical education, was established at Panchthupi in 2007.
- Nagar College was established in 1998 at Nagar.
- Muzaffar Ahmed Mahavidyalaya was established in 1986 at Salar.

== Healthcare ==
The table below (all data in numbers) presents an overview of the medical facilities available and patients treated in the hospitals, health centres and sub-centres in 2014 in Murshidabad district.

Subdivision	Health & Family Welfare Deptt, WB				Other State Govt Deptts	Local bodies	Central Govt Deptts / PSUs	NGO / Private Nursing Homes	Total	Total Number of Beds	Total Number of Doctors*	Indoor Patients	Outdoor Patients
Subdivision	Hospitals	Rural Hospitals	Block Primary Health Centres	Primary Health Centres	Other State Govt Deptts	Local bodies	Central Govt Deptts / PSUs	NGO / Private Nursing Homes	Total	Total Number of Beds	Total Number of Doctors*	Indoor Patients	Outdoor Patients
Barhampur	2	2	4	15	3	-	-	45	71	1,645	282	149,393	2,094,027
Kandi	1	2	3	17	1	-	-	6	30	567	68	85,624	1,005,056
Jangipur	1	1	6	15	-	-	2	12	37	590	62	141,427	1,043,548
Lalbag	1	2	3	14	-	1	1	23	45	483	65	105,562	1,154,275
Domkol	1	2	2	9	-	-	-	19	33	252	44	45,110	802,309
Murshidabad district	6	9	18	70	4	1	3	105	216	2,537	521	527,116	6,099,215

.* Excluding nursing homes

Medical facilities in Kandi subdivision are as follows:

Hospitals: (Name, location, beds)
Kandi Subdivisional Hospital, Kandi, 250 beds
Home for Lunatic Vagrants, Mahalandi, 10 beds

Rural Hospitals: (Name, block, location, beds)
Burwan Rural Hospital, Burwan CD Block, Burwan, 30 beds
Khargram Rural Hospital, Khargram CD Block, Khargram, 50 beds
Gokarna Rural Hospital, Kandi CD Block, Gokarna, 15 beds
Bharatpur Rural Hospital, Bharatapur I CD Block, Bharatpur, 30 beds
Salar Rural Hospital, Bharatpur II CD Block, Salar, 30 beds

Primary Health Centres: (CD Block-wise)(CD Block, PHC location, beds)
Kandi CD Block: Bahara (6), Purandarpur (10), Lakshmikantapur (2)
Bharatpur I CD Block: Amlai (4), Jajan (10)
Bharatpur II CD Block: Kagram (6), Simulia, Duttabarutia (6), Talibpur (10), Tenya (4)
Burwan CD Block: Kuli (6), Kharjuna (Subaldaha) (4), Panchthupi (10), Sundarpur (10)
Khargram CD Block: Margram (10), Jhili, Nonadanga (10), Parulia, Debiparulia (10), Indrani (2)

== Electoral constituencies ==
Lok Sabha (parliamentary) and Vidhan Sabha (state assembly) constituencies in Kandi subdivision were as follows:

Lok Sabha constituency	Reservation	Vidhan Sabha constituency	Reservation	CD Block and/or Gram panchayats and/or municipal areas
Baharampur	None	Kandi	None	Kandi municipality, Kandi CD Block, and Satui Chaurigachha GPs of Berhampore CD Block
		Burwan	Reserved for SC	Biprasekhar, Burwan I, Burwan II, Kharjuna, Kuli, Kurunnorun, Panchthupi, Sabaldaha, Sabalpur, Sahora and Sundarpur gram panchayats of Burwan community development block and Gadda, Jajan and Gundiria GPs of Bharatpur I CD Block
		5 assembly segments in Barhampur subdivision		
Jangipur	None	Khargram	Reserved for SC	Khargram CD Block, and Kalyanpur I and Kalyanpur II GPs of Burwan CD Block
		4 assembly segments in Jangipur subdivision and 2 assembly segments in Lalbag subdivision		
