= Anisur Rahman (politician, born 1952) =

Indian politician

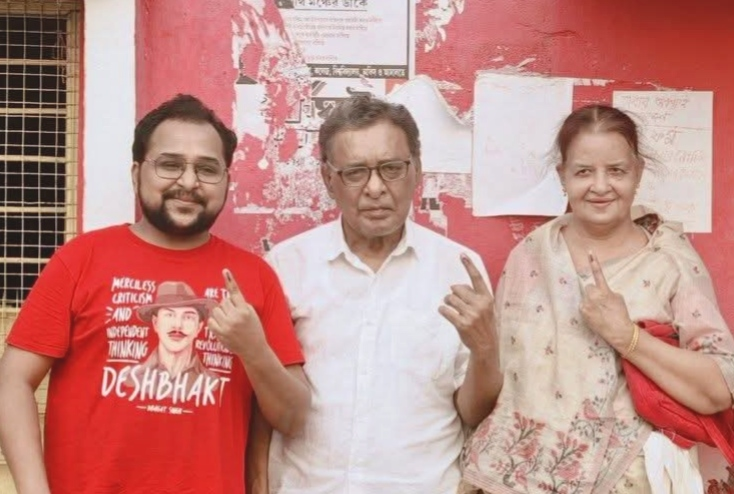

Member of West Bengal Legislative Assembly
- In office 1991–2021
- Preceded by: Md Abdul Bari
- Succeeded by: Jafikul Islam
- Constituency: Domkal

Minister for Animal Resources Development, Government of West Bengal
- In office 1991–2011
- Chief Minister: Buddhadeb Bhattacharjee; Jyoti Basu

Personal details
- Born: 6 June 1952 (age 74) Domkal, Murshidabad West Bengal
- Party: CPI(M)
- Education: University of Calcutta (M.A.)-(B.Ed)
- Profession: Politician, Teacher, social worker

Anisur Rahman Sarkar is an Indian Bengali politician and was a Minister for Panchayat and Rural Development in the Left Front Ministry in the Indian state of West Bengal. He was elected on a CPI(M) ticket from the Domkal Vidhan Sabha constituency in 1991, 1996, 2001, 2006, 2011 and 2016.

Born on 6 June 1952, in Domkal, Murshidabad, West Bengal, Sarkar holds a Master of Arts and a Bachelor of Education degree from the University of Calcutta.
