= Ramna Etbarnagar Basantapur =

- Village
- Location in West Bengal, India Ramna Etbarnagar Basantapur (India)
- Coordinates: 24.11°N 88.53°E
- Country: India
- State: West Bengal
- District: Murshidabad

Government
  - Type: Gram panchayat

Population (2011)
  - Total: 8,409

Languages
  - Official: Bengali, English
- Time zone: UTC+5:30 (IST)
- PIN: 742406
- Lok Sabha constituency: Murshidabad
- Vidhan Sabha constituency: Domkal

Ramna Etbarnagar Basantapur is a village located in Domkal CD block of the Murshidabad district in the state of West Bengal, India.
