= Bharatpur I =

- Community development block
- Interactive map of Bharatpur I
- Coordinates: 23.879101°N 88.088287°E
- Country: India
- State: West Bengal
- District: Murshidabad

Government
  - Type: Federal democracy

Area
  - Total: 182 km^{2} (70 sq mi)
- Elevation: 19 m (62 ft)

Population (2011)
  - Total: 172,702
  - Density: 949/km^{2} (2,460/sq mi)

Languages
  - Official: Bengali, English

Literacy
  - Literacy (2011): 62.93%
- Time zone: UTC+5:30 (IST)
- PIN: 742301 (Bharatpur)
- Telephone/STD code: 03484
- ISO 3166 code: IN-WB
- Vehicle registration: WB-57, WB-58
- Lok Sabha constituency: Baharampur
- Vidhan Sabha constituency: Bharatpur, Burwan
- Website: bdobharatpur1.in

Bharatpur I is a community development block that forms an administrative division in the Kandi subdivision of Murshidabad district in the Indian state of West Bengal.

== Geography ==
Bharatpur is located at 23°52′45″N 88°05′18″E

Bharatpur I CD block is bounded by Kandi CD block in the north, Beldanga II CD block in the east, Bharatpur II CD block and Ketugram I CD block, in Bardhaman district, in the south and Burwan CD block in the west.

Bharatpur I CD block lies in the Mayurakshi Dwaraka plain in the south-eastern corner of Rarh region in Murshidabad district. The Bhagirathi River splits the district into two natural physiographic regions – Rarh on the west and Bagri on the east. The Rarh region is undulating and contains mostly clay and lateritic clay based soil.

The Rarh region or the western part of the district is drained by the right bank tributaries of the Bhagirathi, flowing down from the hilly / plateau region of Santhal Pargana division in neighbouring Jharkhand. The Farakka Barrage regulates the flow of water into the Bhagirathi through the feeder canal. Thereafter, it is fed with the discharge from the Mayurakshi system. About 1,800 km^{2} of area in the neighbourhood of Kandi town is flooded by the combined discharge of the Mayurakshi, Dwarka, Brahmani, Gambhira, Kopai and Bakreshwar – the main contributor being the Mayurakshi. Certain other areas in the western sector also get flooded.

Bharatpur I CD block has an area of 183.72 km^{2}. It has 1 panchayat samity, 8 gram panchayats, 121 gram sansads (village councils), 92 mouzas and 82 inhabited villages. Bharatpur police station serves this block. Headquarters of this CD block is at Bharatpur.

Gram panchayats in Bharatpur I block/ panchayat samiti are: Alugram, Amlai, Bharatpur, Godda, Gundiria, Jajan, Sijgram and Talgram.

Jajan gram panchayet is situated in the north-west of Bharatpur block. This Panchayet has 10 no.of villages named Kujura, Palitpara, Akta, Harishchandrapur, Sardanga, Bindarpur, Jadavpur, Ruha, Jajan, Jadupur .

== Demographics ==
=== Population ===
According to the 2011 Census of India, Bharatpur I CD block had a total population of 172,702, all of which were rural. There were 89,088 (52%) males and 83,614 (48%) females. Population in the age range 0–6 years was 22,944. Scheduled Castes numbered 23,865 (13.82%) and Scheduled Tribes numbered 428 (0.25).

As of 2001 census, Bharatpur I block has a total population of 150,839, out of which 78,238 were males and 72,601 were females. Bharatpur I block registered a population growth of 16.38 per cent during the 1991-2001 decade. Decadal growth for the district was 23.70%. Decadal growth in West Bengal was 17.84%.

The decadal growth of population in Bharatpur I CD block in 2001-2011 was 14.45%.

=== Villages ===
Large villages in Bharatpur CD block were (2011 census figures in brackets): Jajan (4,318), Harishchandrapur (4,192), Bindarpur (4,052), Talgram (5,564), Bharatpur (15,812), Sijgram (5,464), Saiyad Kulutia (4,629), Binodia (4,473), Sahapur (7,825), Amlai (10,115) and Lohadaha (4,531).

=== Literacy ===
As per the 2011 census, the total number of literate persons in Bharatpur I CD block was 94,247 (62.93% of the population over 6 years) out of which males numbered 52,620 (67.94% of the male population over 6 years) and females numbered 41,627 (57.57% of the female population over 6 years). The gender disparity (the difference between female and male literacy rates) was 10.37%.

See also – List of West Bengal districts ranked by literacy rate

Literacy in CD blocks of
Murshidabad district
Jangipur subdivision
Farakka – 59.75%
Samserganj – 54.98%
Suti I – 58.40%
Suti II – 55.23%
Raghunathganj I – 64.49%
Raghunathganj II – 61.17%
Sagardighi – 65.27%
Lalbag subdivision
Murshidabad-Jiaganj – 69.14%
Bhagawangola I - 57.22%
Bhagawangola II – 53.48%
Lalgola– 64.32%
Nabagram – 70.83%
Sadar subdivision
Berhampore – 73.51%
Beldanga I – 70.06%
Beldanga II – 67.86%
Hariharpara – 69.20%
Naoda – 66.09%
Kandi subdivision
Kandi – 65.13%
Khargram – 63.56%
Burwan – 68.96%
Bharatpur I – 62.93%
Bharatpur II – 66.07%
Domkol subdivision
Domkal – 55.89%
Raninagar I – 57.81%
Raninagar II – 54.81%
Jalangi – 58.73%
Source: 2011 Census: CD Block Wise
Primary Census Abstract Data

=== Language and religion ===
Religion in Bharatpur I CD block (2011)
Islam	57.45%
Hinduism	42.39%
Other or not stated	0.16%

In the 2011 census, Muslims numbered 99,217 and formed 57.45% of the population in Bharatpur I CD block. Hindus numbered 73,214 and formed 42.39% of the population. Others numbered 271 and formed 0.16% of the population. In Bharatpur I and Bharatpur II CD blocks taken together while the proportion of Muslims increased from 51.93% in 1991 to 55.13% in 2001, the proportion of Hindus declined from 48.06% in 1991 to 44.801% in 2001.

Murshidabad district had 4,707,573 Muslims who formed 66.27% of the population, 2,359,061 Hindus who formed 33.21% of the population, and 37, 173 persons belonging to other religions who formed 0.52% of the population, in the 2011 census. While the proportion of Muslim population in the district increased from 61.40% in 1991 to 63.67% in 2001, the proportion of Hindu population declined from 38.39% in 1991 to 35.92% in 2001.

Bengali is the predominant language, spoken by 99.94% of the population.

== Rural poverty ==
As per the Human Development Report 2004 for West Bengal, the rural poverty ratio in Murshidabad district was 46.12%. Purulia, Bankura and Birbhum districts had higher rural poverty ratios. These estimates were based on Central Sample data of NSS 55th round 1999–2000.

== Economy ==
=== Livelihood ===
In Bharatpur I CD block in 2011, amongst the class of total workers, cultivators formed 22.77%, agricultural labourers 46.61%, household industry workers 3.82% and other workers 26.80%.

=== Infrastructure ===
There are 82 inhabited villages in Bharatpur I CD block. 100% villages have power supply. 81 villages (91.78%) had drinking water supply. 23 villages (28.05%) have post offices. 79 villages (96.34%) have telephones (including landlines, public call offices and mobile phones). 37 villages (45.12%) have a pucca approach road and 39 villages (47.56%) have transport communication (includes bus service, rail facility and navigable waterways). 5 villages (6.10%) have agricultural credit societies and 5 villages (6.10%) have banks.

=== Agriculture ===
Persons engaged in agriculture
in Bharatpur I CD block
1. Bargadars (6.82%)
2. Patta holders (8.26%)
3. Small farmers (6.80%)
4. Marginal farmers (30.1%)
5. Agricultural labourers (48.1%)

From 1977 onwards major land reforms took place in West Bengal. Land in excess of land ceiling was acquired and distributed amongst the peasants. Following land reforms land ownership pattern has undergone transformation. In 2013–14, persons engaged in agriculture in Bharatpur I CD block could be classified as follows: bargadars 3,831 (6.82%,) patta (document) holders 4,642 (8.26%), small farmers (possessing land between 1 and 2 hectares) 3,823(6.80%), marginal farmers (possessing land up to 1 hectare) 16,887 (30.05%) and agricultural labourers 27,020 (48.08%).

Bharatpur I CD block had 14 fertiliser depots, 5 seed stores and 43 fair price shops in 2013–14.

In 2013–14, Bharatpur I CD block produced 96,620 tonnes of Aman paddy, the main winter crop from 30,229 hectares, 23,571 tonnes of Boro paddy (spring crop) from 6,249 hectares, 966 tonnes of wheat from 354 hectares, 4,613 tonnes of potatoes from 346 hectares and 12,060 tonnes of sugar cane from 148 hectares. It also produced pulses and oilseeds.

In 2013–14, the total area irrigated in Bharatpur I CD block was 5,220 hectares, out of which 2,000 hectares were irrigated by canal water, 1,125 hectares with tank water, 40 hectares by deep tube wells, and 433 hectares by other means.

=== Silk and handicrafts ===
Murshidabad is famous for its silk industry since the Middle Ages. There are three distinct categories in this industry, namely (i) Mulberry cultivation and silkworm rearing (ii) Peeling of raw silk (iii) Weaving of silk fabrics.

Ivory carving is an important cottage industry from the era of the Nawabs. The main areas where this industry has flourished are Khagra and Jiaganj. 99% of ivory craft production is exported. In more recent years sandalwood etching has become more popular than ivory carving. Bell metal and Brass utensils are manufactured in large quantities at Khagra, Berhampore, Kandi and Jangipur. Beedi making has flourished in the Jangipur subdivision.

=== Banking ===
In 2013–14, Bharatpur I CD block had offices of 5 commercial banks and 3 gramin banks.

=== Backward Regions Grant Fund ===
Murshidabad district is listed as a backward region and receives financial support from the Backward Regions Grant Fund. The fund, created by the Government of India, is designed to redress regional imbalances in development. As of 2012, 272 districts across the country were listed under this scheme. The list includes 11 districts of West Bengal.

== Transport ==
Bharatpur I CD block has 15 ferry services and 3 originating/ terminating bus routes. The nearest railway station is 14 km from the CD block headquarters.

The Kandi-Katwa Road passes through this block.

== Education ==
In 2013–14, Bharatpur I CD block had 101 primary schools with 9,524 students, 23 middle schools with 3,168 students, 4 high school with 2,708 students and 9 higher secondary schools with 12,120 students. Bharatpur I CD block had 253 institutions special and non-formal education with 11,740 students.

In Bharatpur I CD block, amongst the 82 inhabited villages, 5 villages do not have a school, 30 villages have more than 1 primary school, 35 villages have at least 1 primary and 1 middle school and 15 villages had at least 1 middle and 1 secondary school.

== Healthcare ==
In 2014, Bharatpur I CD block had 1 block primary health centre and 2 primary health centres with total 35 beds and 8 doctors (excluding private bodies). It had 24 family welfare subcentres. 7,628 patients were treated indoor and 164,603 patients were treated outdoor in the hospitals, health centres and subcentres of the CD block.

Bharatpur I CD block has Bharatpur Rural Hospital at Bharatpur (with 30 beds), Amlai Primary Health Centre (with 4 beds) and Jajan PHC (with 10 beds).

Bharatpur I CD block is one of the areas of Murshidabad district where ground water is affected by a moderate level of arsenic contamination. The WHO guideline for arsenic in drinking water is 10 mg/ litre, and the Indian Standard value is 50 mg/ litre. All but one of the 26 blocks of Murshidabad district have arsenic contamination above the WHO level, all but two of the blocks have arsenic concentration above the Indian Standard value and 17 blocks have arsenic concentration above 300 mg/litre. The maximum concentration in Bharatpur I CD block is 82 mg/litre.
