= Burwan (community development block) =

- Community development block
- Interactive map of Burwan
- Coordinates: 23.940889°N 87.934952°E
- Country: India
- State: West Bengal
- District: Murshidabad

Government
  - Type: Federal democracy

Area
  - Total: 270.94 km^{2} (104.61 sq mi)
- Elevation: 58 m (190 ft)

Population (2011)
  - Total: 257,466
  - Density: 950.27/km^{2} (2,461.2/sq mi)

Languages
  - Official: Bengali, English

Literacy
  - Literacy (2011): 68.96%
- Time zone: UTC+5:30 (IST)
- PIN: 742132 (Burwan); 742184; 742168; 742137 (Kuli)
- Telephone/STD code: 03484
- ISO 3166 code: IN-WB
- Vehicle registration: WB-57, WB-58
- Lok Sabha constituency: Baharampur
- Vidhan Sabha constituency: Burwan, Khargram
- Website: burwanblock.in

Burwan is a community development block that forms an administrative division in the Kandi subdivision of Murshidabad district in the Indian state of West Bengal.

== Geography ==
Burwan is located at 23°56′27″N 87°56′06″E

Burwan CD block is bounded by Khargram CD block in the north, Kandi and Bharatpur I CD blocks in the east, Mayureshwar II CD block, in Birbhum district, in the south and west.

Burwan CD block lies in the Mayurakshi Dwaraka plain in the south-eastern corner of Rarh region in Murshidabad district. The Bhagirathi River splits the district into two natural physiographic regions – Rarh on the west and Bagri on the east. The Rarh region is undulating and contains mostly clay and lateritic clay based soil.

The Rarh region or the western part of the district is drained by the right bank tributaries of the Bhagirathi, flowing down from the hilly / plateau region of Santhal Pargana division in neighbouring Jharkhand. The Farakka Barrage regulates the flow of water into the Bhagirathi through the feeder canal. Thereafter, it is fed with the discharge from the Mayurakshi system. About 1,800 km^{2} of area in the neighbourhood of Kandi town is flooded by the combined discharge of the Mayurakshi, Dwarka, Brahmani, Gambhira, Kopai and Bakreshwar – the main contributor being the Mayurakshi. Certain other areas in the western sector also get flooded.

Burwan CD block has an area of 299.66 km^{2}. It has 1 panchayat samity, 13 gram panchayats, 185 gram sansads (village councils), 155 mouzas and 138 inhabited villages. Burwan police station serves this block. Headquarters of this CD block is at Gram Salkia.

Gram panchayats in Burwan block/ panchayat samiti are: Biprasekhar, Burwan I, Burwan II, Kalyanpur I, Kalyanpur II, Kharjuna, Kuli, Kurunnurun, Panchthupi, Sabaldaha, Sabalpur, Sahora and Sundarpur.

== Demographics ==
=== Population ===
According to the 2011 Census of India Burwan CD block had a total population of 257,466, all of which were rural. There were 132,439 (51%) males and 125,027 (49%) females. The population in the age range 0–6 years numbered 32,063. Scheduled Castes numbered 63,098 (24.51%) and Scheduled Tribes numbered 2,955 (1.15%).

In 2011, Gram Salkia, the block headquarters had a population of 3,087.

As per 2001 census, Burwan block has a total population of 224,312, out of which 115,445 were males and 108,867 were females. Burwan block registered a population growth of 13.91 per cent during the 1991-2001 decade. Decadal growth for the district was 23.70 per cent. Decadal growth in West Bengal was 17.84 per cent.

The decadal growth of population in Burwan CD block in 2001-2011 was 14.74%.

=== Villages ===
Large villages in Burwan CD block were (2011 census population in brackets): Jhikarhati (8,163), Kundal (4,584), Barwan (8,974), Panchthupi (7,956) and Badua (7,051).Beldanga

=== Literacy ===
As per the 2011 census, the total number of literates in Burwan CD block was 155,449 (68.96% of the population over 6 years) out of which males numbered 86,929 (74.97% of the male population over 6 years) and females numbered 68,520 (62.60% of the female population over 6 years). The gender disparity (the difference between female and male literacy rates) was 12.37%.

See also – List of West Bengal districts ranked by literacy rate

Literacy in CD blocks of
Murshidabad district
Jangipur subdivision
Farakka – 59.75%
Samserganj – 54.98%
Suti I – 58.40%
Suti II – 55.23%
Raghunathganj I – 64.49%
Raghunathganj II – 61.17%
Sagardighi – 65.27%
Lalbag subdivision
Murshidabad-Jiaganj – 69.14%
Bhagawangola I - 57.22%
Bhagawangola II – 53.48%
Lalgola– 64.32%
Nabagram – 70.83%
Sadar subdivision
Berhampore – 73.51%
Beldanga I – 70.06%
Beldanga II – 67.86%
Hariharpara – 69.20%
Naoda – 66.09%
Kandi subdivision
Kandi – 65.13%
Khargram – 63.56%
Burwan – 68.96%
Bharatpur I – 62.93%
Bharatpur II – 66.07%
Domkol subdivision
Domkal – 55.89%
Raninagar I – 57.81%
Raninagar II – 54.81%
Jalangi – 58.73%
Source: 2011 Census: CD Block Wise
Primary Census Abstract Data

=== Language and religion ===
Religion in Burwan CD block (2011)
Hinduism	56.76%
Islam	43.06%
Other or not stated	0.18%

In the 2011 census, in Burwan CD block. Hindus numbered 146140 and formed 56.76% of the population, Muslims numbered 110,861 and formed 43.06% of the population. Others numbered 465 and formed 0.18% of the population. In Burwan CD block while the proportion of Muslims increased from 38.45% in 1991 to 40.20% in 2001, the proportion of Hindus declined from 61.50% in 1991 to 59.66% in 2001. Burwan is the only block in Murshidabad where Muslims are in a minority.

Murshidabad district had 4,707,573 Muslims who formed 66.27% of the population, 2,359,061 Hindus who formed 33.21% of the population, and 37, 173 persons belonging to other religions who formed 0.52% of the population, in the 2011 census. While the proportion of Muslim population in the district increased from 61.40% in 1991 to 63.67% in 2001, the proportion of Hindu population declined from 38.39% in 1991 to 35.92% in 2001.

Murshidabad was the only Muslim majority district in West Bengal at the time of partition of India in 1947. The proportion of Muslims in the population of Murshidabad district in 1951 was 55.24%. The Radcliffe Line had placed Muslim majority Murshidabad in India and the Hindu majority Khulna in Pakistan, in order to maintain the integrity of the Ganges river system In India.

Bengali is the predominant language, spoken by 99.23% of the population.

== Rural poverty ==
As per the Human Development Report 2004 for West Bengal, the rural poverty ratio in Murshidabad district was 46.12%. Purulia, Bankura and Birbhum districts had higher rural poverty ratios. These estimates were based on Central Sample data of NSS 55th round 1999-2000.

== Economy ==
=== Livelihood ===
In Burwan CD block in 2011, amongst the class of total workers, cultivators formed 25.12%, agricultural labourers 50.99%, household industry workers 3.54% and other workers 20.35%.

=== Infrastructure ===
There are 155 inhabited villages in Burwan CD block. 100% villages have power supply and drinking water supply. 38 villages (25.42%) have post offices. 145 villages (93.55%) have telephones (including landlines, public call offices and mobile phones). 66 villages (42.58%) have a pucca approach road and 76 villages (49.03%) have transport communication (includes bus service, rail facility and navigable waterways). 17 villages (10.97%) have agricultural credit societies and 15 villages (9.68%) have banks.

=== Agriculture ===
Persons engaged in agriculture
in Burwan CD block
1. Bargadars (5.44%)
2. Patta holders (4.22%)
3. Small farmers (5.98%)
4. Marginal farmers (30.2%)
5. Agricultural labourers (54.1%)

From 1977 onwards major land reforms took place in West Bengal. Land in excess of land ceiling was acquired and distributed amongst the peasants. Following land reforms land ownership pattern has undergone transformation. In 2013-14, persons engaged in agriculture in Burwan CD block could be classified as follows: bargadars 4,334 (5.44%,) patta (document) holders 3,359 (4.22%), small farmers (possessing land between 1 and 2 hectares) 4,765(5.98%), marginal farmers (possessing land up to 1 hectare) 24,106 (30.25%) and agricultural labourers 43,115 (54.11%).

Burwan CD block had 15 fertiliser depots, 3 seed stores and 71 fair price shops in 2013-14.

In 2013-14, Burwan CD block produced 5,220 tonnes of Aman paddy, the main winter crop from 1,878 hectares, 35,692 tonnes of Boro paddy (spring crop) from 10,346 hectares, 1,360 tonnes of Aus paddy (summer crop) from 507 hectares, 2,314 tonnes of wheat from 890 hectares, 445 tonnes of jute from 33 hectares, 37,401 tonnes of potatoes from 2,999 hectares and 8,196 tonnes of sugar cane from 106 hectares. It also produced pulses and oilseeds.

In 2013-14, the total area irrigated in Burwan CD block was 3,180 hectares, out of which 2,000 hectares were irrigated by canal water, 200 hectares with tank water, 257 hectares by deep tube wells, and 723 hectares by other means.

=== Silk and handicrafts ===
Murshidabad is famous for its silk industry since the Middle Ages. There are three distinct categories in this industry, namely (i) Mulberry cultivation and silkworm rearing (ii) Peeling of raw silk (iii) Weaving of silk fabrics.

Ivory carving is an important cottage industry from the era of the Nawabs. The main areas where this industry has flourished are Khagra and Jiaganj. 99% of ivory craft production is exported. In more recent years sandalwood etching has become more popular than ivory carving. Bell metal and Brass utensils are manufactured in large quantities at Khagra, Berhampore, Kandi and Jangipur. Beedi making has flourished in the Jangipur subdivision.

=== Banking ===
In 2013-14, Burwan CD block had offices of 10 commercial banks and 3 gramin banks.

=== Backward Regions Grant Fund ===
Murshidabad district is listed as a backward region and receives financial support from the Backward Regions Grant Fund. The fund, created by the Government of India, is designed to redress regional imbalances in development. As of 2012, 272 districts across the country were listed under this scheme. The list includes 11 districts of West Bengal.

== Transport ==
Burwan CD block has 10 ferry services and 9 originating/ terminating bus routes. The nearest railway station is 40 km from the CD block headquarters.

State Highway 7 running from Rajgram (in Birbhum district) to Midnapore (in Paschim Medinipur district) passes through this CD Block.

== Education ==
In 2013-14, Burwan CD block had 174 primary schools with 13,115 students, 37 middle schools with 3,960 students, 11 high school with 7,750 students and 13 higher secondary schools with 16,078 students. Burwan CD block had 1 general college with 791 students, 1 technical/ professional institution with 50 students and 411 institutions special and non-formal education with 14,608 students.

Panchthupi Haripada Gouribala College was established in 1996 at Panchthupi. Affiliated with the University of Kalyani it offers honours courses in Bengali, English, Sanskrit, philosophy, political science and history. It offers general courses in Bengali, English, Sanskrit, Arabic, philosophy, political science and history.

Sunil Dhar Memorial B.P.Ed. College, a college for physical education, was established at Panchthupi in 2007.

In Burwan CD block, amongst the 155 inhabited villages, 7 villages do not have a school, 72 villages have more than 1 primary school, 57 villages have at least 1 primary and 1 middle school and 28 villages had at least 1 middle and 1 secondary school.

== Healthcare ==
In 2014, Burwan CD block had 1 rural hospital, 4 primary health centres and 2 private nursing homes with total 60 beds and 8 doctors (excluding private bodies). It had 37 family welfare subcentres. 10,117 patients were treated indoor and 152,681 patients were treated outdoor in the hospitals, health centres and subcentres of the CD block.

Burwan CD block has Burwan Rural Hospital at Burwan (with 30 beds), Kuli Primary Health Centre (with 6 beds), Kharjuna (Subaldaha) PHC (with 4 beds), Panchthupi PHC (with 10 beds) and Sundarpur PHC (with 10 beds)

Burwan CD block is one of the areas of Murshidabad district where ground water is affected by moderate level of arsenic contamination. The WHO guideline for arsenic in drinking water is 10 mg/ litre, and the Indian Standard value is 50 mg/ litre. All but one of the 26 blocks of Murshidabad district have arsenic contamination above the WHO level, all but two of the blocks have arsenic concentration above the Indian Standard value and 17 blocks have arsenic concentration above 300 mg/litre. The maximum concentration in Burwan CD block is 64 mg/litre.
