= Bharatpur II =

- Community development block
- Interactive map of Bharatpur II
- Coordinates: 23.7821200°N 88.0996320°E
- Country: India
- State: West Bengal
- District: Murshidabad

Government
  - Type: Federal democracy

Area
  - Total: 98.74 km^{2} (38.12 sq mi)
- Elevation: 26 m (85 ft)

Population (2011)
  - Total: 176,368
  - Density: 1,786/km^{2} (4,626/sq mi)

Languages
  - Official: Bengali, English

Literacy
  - Literacy (2011): 66.07%
- Time zone: UTC+5:30 (IST)
- PIN: 742401 (Salar); 742402 (Talibpur); 742404 (Tenya); 713123 (Banwaribad Raj)
- Telephone/STD code: 03484
- ISO 3166 code: IN-WB
- Vehicle registration: WB-57, WB-58
- Lok Sabha constituency: Baharampur
- Vidhan Sabha constituency: Bharatpur
- Website: murshidabad.gov.in

Bharatpur II is a community development block that forms an administrative division in the Kandi subdivision of Murshidabad district in the Indian state of West Bengal.

== Geography ==
Salar is located at 23°46′56″N 88°05′59″E

Bharatpur II CD block is bounded by Bharatpur I CD Block in the north, Beldanga II and Kaliganj CD block, in Nadia district, in the east, Ketugram II CD block, in Bardhaman district, in the south and Ketugram I CD block, in Bardhaman district, in the west.

Bharatpur II CD block lies in the Mayurakshi Dwaraka plain in the south-eastern corner of Rarh region in Murshidabad district. The Bhagirathi River splits the district into two natural physiographic regions – Rarh on the west and Bagri on the east. The Rarh region is undulating and contains mostly clay and lateritic clay based soil.

The Rarh region or the western part of the district is drained by the right bank tributaries of the Bhagirathi, flowing down from the hilly / plateau region of Santhal Pargana division in neighbouring Jharkhand. The Farakka Barrage regulates the flow of water into the Bhagirathi through the feeder canal. Thereafter, it is fed with the discharge from the Mayurakshi system. About 1,800 km^{2} of area in the neighbourhood of Kandi town is flooded by the combined discharge of the Mayurakshi, Dwarka, Brahmani, Gambhira, Kopai and Bakreshwar – the main contributor being the Mayurakshi. Certain other areas in the western sector also get flooded.

Bharatpur II CD block has an area of 158.50 km^{2}. It has 1 panchayat samity, 7 gram panchayats, 123 gram sansads (village councils), 52 mouzas and 51 inhabited villages. Salar police station serves this block. Headquarters of this CD block is at Salar.

Gram panchayats in Bharatpur II block/ panchayat samiti are: Kagram, Malihati, Salar, Salu, Simulia, Talibpur and Tenya Baidyapur.

== Demographics ==
=== Population ===
According to the 2011 Census of India, Bharatpur II CD block had a total population of 176,368, of which 153,474 were rural and 22,894 were urban. There were 90,031 (51%) males and 86,337 (49%) females. Population in the age range 0–6 years of age numbered 23,102. Scheduled Castes numbered 32,983 (18.70%) and Scheduled Tribes numbered 197 (0.11%).

As per 2001 census, Bharatpur II block has a total population of 150,115, out of which 76,993 were males and 73,442 were females. Bharatpur II block registered a population growth of 17.89 per cent during the 1991-2001 decade. Decadal growth for the district was 23.70 per cent. Decadal growth in West Bengal was 17.84 per cent.

The decadal growth of population in Bharatpur II CD block in 2001-2011 was 17.47%.

=== Census town and villages ===
The only census town in Bharatpur II CD block was (2011 population figure in brackets): Salar (22,894).

Large villages in Bharatpur II CD block were (2011 population figures in brackets): Khanrera (8,440), Punasi (4,751), Dakshinkhanda (4,497), Tenya (4,786) and Sarmastapur (7,955).

Other villages in Bharatpur II CD block included (2011 population figure in brackets): Duttabarutia (3.282).

=== Literacy ===
As per the 2011 census, the total number of literate persons in Bharatpur II CD block was 101,264 (66.07% of the population over 6 years) out of which males numbered 55,527 (70.96% of the male population over 6 years) and females numbered 45,737 (60.97% of the female population over 6 years). The gender disparity (the difference between female and male literacy rates) was 9.99%.

See also – List of West Bengal districts ranked by literacy rate

Literacy in CD blocks of
Murshidabad district
Jangipur subdivision
Farakka – 59.75%
Samserganj – 54.98%
Suti I – 58.40%
Suti II – 55.23%
Raghunathganj I – 64.49%
Raghunathganj II – 61.17%
Sagardighi – 65.27%
Lalbag subdivision
Murshidabad-Jiaganj – 69.14%
Bhagawangola I - 57.22%
Bhagawangola II – 53.48%
Lalgola– 64.32%
Nabagram – 70.83%
Sadar subdivision
Berhampore – 73.51%
Beldanga I – 70.06%
Beldanga II – 67.86%
Hariharpara – 69.20%
Naoda – 66.09%
Kandi subdivision
Kandi – 65.13%
Khargram – 63.56%
Burwan – 68.96%
Bharatpur I – 62.93%
Bharatpur II – 66.07%
Domkol subdivision
Domkal – 55.89%
Raninagar I – 57.81%
Raninagar II – 54.81%
Jalangi – 58.73%
Source: 2011 Census: CD Block Wise
Primary Census Abstract Data

=== Language and religion ===
Religion in Bharatpur II CD block (2011)
Islam	57.71%
Hinduism	42.16%
Other or not stated	0.13%

In the 2011 census, Muslims numbered 101,789 and formed 57.71% of the population in Bharatpur II CD block. Hindus numbered 74,359 and formed 42.16% of the population. Others numbered 220 and formed 0.13% of the population. In Bharatpur I and Bharatpur II CD Blocks taken together while the proportion of Muslims increased from 51.93% in 1991 to 55.13% in 2001, the proportion of Hindus declined from 48.06% in 1991 to 44.80% in 2001.

Murshidabad district had 4,707,573 Muslims who formed 66.27% of the population, 2,359,061 Hindus who formed 33.21% of the population, and 37, 173 persons belonging to other religions who formed 0.52% of the population, in the 2011 census. While the proportion of Muslim population in the district increased from 61.40% in 1991 to 63.67% in 2001, the proportion of Hindu population declined from 38.39% in 1991 to 35.92% in 2001.

Bengali is the predominant language, spoken by 99.94% of the population.

== Rural poverty ==
As per the Human Development Report 2004 for West Bengal, the rural poverty ratio in Murshidabad district was 46.12%. Purulia, Bankura and Birbhum districts had higher rural poverty ratios. These estimates were based on Central Sample data of NSS 55th round 1999-2000.

== Economy ==
=== Livelihood ===
In Bharatpur II CD block in 2011, amongst the class of total workers, cultivators formed 15.74%, agricultural labourers 40.60%, household industry workers 14.28% and other workers 29.37%.

=== Infrastructure ===
There are 51 inhabited villages in Bharatpur II CD block. 100% villages have power supply and drinking water supply. 21 villages (41.18%) have post offices. 58 villages (98.04%) have telephones (including landlines, public call offices and mobile phones). 25 villages (49.02%) have a pucca approach road and 23 villages (45.10%) have transport communication (includes bus service, rail facility and navigable waterways). 6 villages (11.76%) have agricultural credit societies and 7 villages (13.73%) have banks.

=== Agriculture ===
Persons engaged in agriculture
in Bharatpur II CD block
1. Bargadars (4.68%)
2. Patta holders (4.79%)
3. Small farmers (7.23%)
4. Marginal farmers (29.5%)
5. Agricultural labourers (53.8%)

From 1977 onwards major land reforms took place in West Bengal. Land in excess of land ceiling was acquired and distributed amongst the peasants. Following land reforms land ownership pattern has undergone transformation. In 2013-14, persons engaged in agriculture in Bharatpur II CD block could be classified as follows: bargadars 2,208 (4.68%,) patta (document) holders 2,260 (4.79%), small farmers (possessing land between 1 and 2 hectares) 3,411 (7.23%), marginal farmers (possessing land up to 1 hectare) 13,920 (29.49%) and agricultural labourers 25,398 (53.81%).

Bharatpur II CD block had 35 fertiliser depots, 2 seed stores and 39 fair price shops in 2013-14.

In 2013-14, Bharatpur II CD block produced 38,789 tonnes of Aman paddy, the main winter crop from 13,265 hectares, 21,780 tonnes of Boro paddy (spring crop) from 7,354 hectares, 144 tonnes of wheat from 57 hectares, 2,145 tonnes of jute from 207 hectares, 5,612 tonnes of potatoes from 188 hectares and 1,368 tonnes of sugar cane from 19 hectares. It also produced pulses and oilseeds.

In 2013-14, the total area irrigated in Bharatpur II CD block was 11,290 hectares, out of which 7,000 hectares were irrigated by canal water, 20 hectares with tank water, 444 hectares by river lift irrigation, 360 hectares by deep tube wells, and 3,466 hectares by other means.

=== Silk and handicrafts ===
Murshidabad is famous for its silk industry since the Middle Ages. There are three distinct categories in this industry, namely (i) Mulberry cultivation and silkworm rearing (ii) Peeling of raw silk (iii) Weaving of silk fabrics.

Ivory carving is an important cottage industry from the era of the Nawabs. The main areas where this industry has flourished are Khagra and Jiaganj. 99% of ivory craft production is exported. In more recent years sandalwood etching has become more popular than ivory carving. Bell metal and Brass utensils are manufactured in large quantities at Khagra, Berhampore, Kandi and Jangipur. “Beedi” making has flourished in the Jangipur subdivision.

=== Banking ===
In 2013-14, Bharatpur II CD block had offices of 6 commercial banks and 4 gramin banks.

=== Backward Regions Grant Fund ===
Murshidabad district is listed as a backward region and receives financial support from the Backward Regions Grant Fund. The fund, created by the Government of India, is designed to redress regional imbalances in development. As of 2012, 272 districts across the country were listed under this scheme. The list includes 11 districts of West Bengal.

== Transport ==
Bharatpur II CD block has 2 ferry services and 10 originating/ terminating bus routes.

The Barharwa-Azimganj-Katwa loop line passes through this block and there are stations at Salar and Tenya.

The Kandi-Katwa Road passes through this block.

== Education ==
In 2013-14, Bharatpur II CD block had 94 primary schools with 10,549 students, 9 middle schools with 843 students, 11 high school with 7,389 students and 8 higher secondary schools with 11,601 students. Bharatpur II CD block had 1 general college with 2,238 students and 255 institutions special and non-formal education with 8,910 students.

Muzaffar Ahmed Mahavidyalaya was established in 1986 at Salar. Affiliated with the University of Kalyani it offers courses in Bengali, English, Sanskrit, Arabic, history, geography, political science, sociology and education.

In Bharatpur II CD block, amongst the 51 inhabited villages, 1 village did not have a school, 32 villages have more than 1 primary school, 28 villages have at least 1 primary and 1 middle school and 19 villages had at least 1 middle and 1 secondary school.

== Healthcare ==
In 2014, Bharatpur II CD block had 1 block primary health centre, 4 primary health centres and 1 private nursing home with total 62 beds and 8 doctors (excluding private bodies). It had 24 family welfare subcentres. 6,556 patients were treated indoor and 157,525 patients were treated outdoor in the hospitals, health centres and subcentres of the CD Block.

Bharatpur II CD block has Salar Rural Hospital at Salar (with 30 beds), Kagram Primary Health Centre (with 6 beds), Simulia PHC at Duttabarutia (with 6 beds), Talibpur PHC (with 10 beds) and Tenya PHC (with 4 beds)

Bharatpur II CD Block is the only CD block in Murshidabad district where ground water is not affected by arsenic contamination. The WHO guideline for arsenic in drinking water is 10 mg/ litre, and the Indian Standard value is 50 mg/ litre. All but one of the 26 blocks of Murshidabad district have arsenic contamination above the WHO level, all but two of the blocks have arsenic concentration above the Indian Standard value and 17 blocks have arsenic concentration above 300 mg/litre. The maximum concentration in Bharatpur I CD block is >3 mg/litre.
