= Duttabarutia =

Dutta Barutia
- Village
- Location in West Bengal, India Dutta Barutia (India)
- Coordinates: 23.77202°N 88.074632°E
- Country: India
- State: West Bengal
- District: Murshidabad

Population (2011)
  - Total: 3,282

Languages
  - Official: Bengali, English
- Time zone: UTC+5:30 (IST)
- PIN: 742401
- Telephone code: 03484
- ISO 3166 code: IN-WB
- Nearest city: Katwa, Kandi, & Berhampur

Duttabarutia is a village in Bharatpur II CD Block in Kandi subdivision Murshidabad district in West Bengal, India.

== Demographics ==
As per the 2011 Census of India, Duttabarutia had a total population of 3,282, of which 1,679 (51%) were males and 1,603 (49%) were females. Population below 6 years was 368. The total number of literates was 1,843 (63.25% of the population over 6 years).

== Education ==
There are two primary schools. One is situated at the center of the village named Duttabarutia 1 No Primary School and the other is in the west of the village named Duttabarutia 2 No Primary School.

== Culture ==
There are two famous temples named after Lord Shiva (Raghaveswar) and Goddess Kali in the village. No separate idol of Kali is worshiped during Kali Puja. The reason for this is not clearly known. However, people think that the existing famous Kali temple might be the reason.

== Healthcare ==
There is a Primary Health Centre, with 6 beds, at Duttabarutia.

== Sports ==
There is a Big Play Ground at the entrance of the village.
