= Mitali Mal =

Indian politician (born 1998)

Mitali Mal (born 1998) is an Indian politician from West Bengal. She is a member of the West Bengal Legislative Assembly from the Khargram Assembly constituency, which is reserved for Scheduled Caste community in Murshidabad district, representing the Bharatiya Janata Party.

Mal is from Hassan, Murshidabad district, West Bengal. She married Mithun Ghosh. She completed her BA in history in 2024 at Rampurhat College which is affiliated with Netaji Subhas Open University. She declared assets worth Rs.12 lakhs in her affidavit with the Election Commission of India.

== Career ==
Mal won the Khargram Assembly constituency representing the Bharatiya Janata Party in the 2026 West Bengal Legislative Assembly election. She polled 77,748 votes and defeated her nearest rival, Ashis Marjit of the All India Trinamool Congress, by a margin of 9,333 votes.
