= Manabendranath Saha =

Indian politician (c. 1962–2019)

West Bengal Legislative Assembly
- In office 2006–2011
- Preceded by: Biswanath Mondal
- Succeeded by: Ashis Marjit
- Constituency: Khargram

Personal details
- Born: c. 1962
- Died: 16 November 2019 (aged 57)
- Party: Communist Party of India (Marxist)

Manabendranath Saha (c. 1962 – 16 November 2019) was an Indian teacher and politician belonging to the Communist Party of India (Marxist). He was a member of the West Bengal Legislative Assembly.

== Biography ==
Saha was a primary school teacher and politician. He was elected as a member of the West Bengal Legislative Assembly Khargram in 2006. He committed suicide on 16 November 2019 at the age of 57.
