= Khargram (community development block) =

- Community development block
- Interactive map of Khargram
- Coordinates: 24.0362700°N 87.9932710°E
- Country: India
- State: West Bengal
- District: Murshidabad

Government
  - Type: Federal democracy

Area
  - Total: 378.80 km^{2} (146.26 sq mi)
- Elevation: 27 m (89 ft)

Population (2011)
  - Total: 273,332
  - Density: 721.57/km^{2} (1,868.9/sq mi)

Languages
  - Official: Bengali, English

Literacy
  - Literacy (2011): 63.56%
- Time zone: UTC+5:30 (IST)
- PIN: 742159 (Khargram)
- Telephone/STD code: 03484
- ISO 3166 code: IN-WB
- Vehicle registration: WB-57, WB-58
- Lok Sabha constituency: Jangipur
- Vidhan Sabha constituency: Khargram
- Website: murshidbad.nic.in

Khargram is a community development block that forms an administrative division in the Kandi subdivision of Murshidabad district in the Indian state of West Bengal.

== Geography ==
Khargram is located at 24°02′11″N 87°59′36″E

Khargram CD block is bounded by Nabagram CD block in the north, In the east Kandi, In the South Burwan and Rampurhat II CD block in the west.

Khargram CD block lies in the Mayurakshi Dwaraka plain in the south-eastern corner of Rarh region in Murshidabad district. The Bhagirathi River splits the district into two natural physiographic regions – Rarh on the west and Bagri on the east. The Rarh region is undulating and contains mostly clay and lateritic clay based soil.

The Rarh region or the western part of the district is drained by the right bank tributaries of the Bhagirathi, flowing down from the hilly / plateau region of Santhal Pargana division in neighbouring Jharkhand. The Farakka Barrage regulates the flow of water into the Bhagirathi through the feeder canal. Thereafter, it is fed with the discharge from the Mayurakshi system. About 1,800 km^{2} of area in the neighbourhood of Kandi town is flooded by the combined discharge of the Mayurakshi, Dwarka, Brahmani, Gambhira, Kopai and Bakreshwar – the main contributor being the Mayurakshi. Certain other areas in the western sector also get flooded.

Khargram CD block has an area of 318.45 km^{2}. It has 1 panchayat samity, 12 gram panchayats, 186 gram sansads (village councils), 160 mouzas and 155 inhabited villages. Khargram police station serves this block. Headquarters of this CD block is at Nagar.

Gram panchayats in Khargram block/ panchayat samiti are: Balia, Eroali, Indrani, Jhilli, Joypur, Khargram, Kirtipur, Margram, Mohisar, Padamkandi, Parulia and Sadal.

== Demographics ==
=== Population ===
According to the 2011 Census of India, Khargram CD block had a total population of 273,332, all of which were rural. There were 139,533 (51%) males and 133,799 (49%) females. The population in the age range 0-6 years was 37,804. Scheduled Castes numbered 59,929 (21.93%) and Scheduled Tribes numbered 2,442 (0.89%).

As per 2001 census, Khargram block has a total population of 234,715, out of which 120,352 were males and 114,363 were females. Khargram block registered a population growth of 16.04 per cent during the 1991-2001 decade. Decadal growth for the district was 23.70 per cent. Decadal growth in West Bengal was 17.84 per cent.

The decadal growth of population in Khargram CD block in 2001-2011 was 16.42%.

=== Villages ===
Large villages in Khargram CD block were (2011 population figures in brackets): Jhilli (5,162), Indrani (7,018), Rahigram (4,395), Sankarpur (10,124), Asalpur (5,010), Parulia (4,400), Nagar (11,882), Sahapur (5,409), Jatarpur (4,098), Khargram (11,209) and Mahisar (4,325).

=== Literacy ===
According to the 2011 census, the total number of literate persons in Khargram CD block was 149,700 (63.56% of the population over 6 years) out of which males numbered 83,797 (69.69% of the male population over 6 years) and females numbered 65,903 (57.16% of the female population over 6 years). The gender disparity (the difference between female and male literacy rates) was 12.53%.

See also – List of West Bengal districts ranked by literacy rate

Literacy in CD blocks of
Murshidabad district
Jangipur subdivision
Farakka – 59.75%
Samserganj – 54.98%
Suti I – 58.40%
Suti II – 55.23%
Raghunathganj I – 64.49%
Raghunathganj II – 61.17%
Sagardighi – 65.27%
Lalbag subdivision
Murshidabad-Jiaganj – 69.14%
Bhagawangola I - 57.22%
Bhagawangola II – 53.48%
Lalgola– 64.32%
Nabagram – 70.83%
Sadar subdivision
Berhampore – 73.51%
Beldanga I – 70.06%
Beldanga II – 67.86%
Hariharpara – 69.20%
Naoda – 66.09%
Kandi subdivision
Kandi – 65.13%
Khargram – 63.56%
Burwan – 68.96%
Bharatpur I – 62.93%
Bharatpur II – 66.07%
Domkol subdivision
Domkal – 55.89%
Raninagar I – 57.81%
Raninagar II – 54.81%
Jalangi – 58.73%
Source: 2011 Census: CD Block Wise
Primary Census Abstract Data

=== Language and religion ===
Religion in Khargram CD block (2011)
Islam	54.22%
Hinduism	45.53%
Other or not stated	0.25%

In the 2011 census, Muslims numbered 148,206 and formed 54.22% of the population in Khargram CD block. Hindus numbered 124,440 and formed 45.53% of the population. Others numbered 686 and formed 0.25% of the population. In Khargram CD block while the proportion of Muslims increased from 47.31% in 1991 to 51.35% in 2001, the proportion of Hindus declined from 52.63% in 1991 to 48.48% in 2001.

Murshidabad district had 4,707,573 Muslims who formed 66.27% of the population, 2,359,061 Hindus who formed 33.21% of the population, and 37, 173 persons belonging to other religions who formed 0.52% of the population, in the 2011 census. While the proportion of Muslim population in the district increased from 61.40% in 1991 to 63.67% in 2001, the proportion of Hindu population declined from 38.39% in 1991 to 35.92% in 2001.

Bengali is the predominant language, spoken by 99.51% of the population.

== Rural poverty ==
As per the Human Development Report 2004 for West Bengal, the rural poverty ratio in Murshidabad district was 46.12%. Purulia, Bankura and Birbhum districts had higher rural poverty ratios. These estimates were based on Central Sample data of NSS 55th round 1999-2000.

== Economy ==
=== Livelihood ===
In Khargram CD block in 2011, amongst the class of total workers, cultivators formed 20.68%, agricultural labourers 53.69%, household industry workers 7.32% and other workers 18.31%.

=== Infrastructure ===
There are 138 inhabited villages in Khargram CD block. 100% villages have power supply. 137 villages (99.28%) have drinking water supply. 30 villages (21.74%) have post offices. 132 villages (95.65%) have telephones (including landlines, public call offices and mobile phones). 35 villages (25.36%) have a pucca approach road and 54 villages (39.14%) have transport communication (includes bus service, rail facility and navigable waterways). 17 villages (12.32%) have agricultural credit societies and 9 villages (6.52%) have banks.

=== Agriculture ===
Persons engaged in agriculture
in Khargram CD block
1. Bargadars (7.12%)
2. Patta holders (10.6%)
3. Small farmers (4.42%)
4. Marginal farmers (27.4%)
5. Agricultural labourers (50.5%)

From 1977 onwards major land reforms took place in West Bengal. Land in excess of land ceiling was acquired and distributed amongst the peasants. Following land reforms land ownership pattern has undergone transformation. In 2013-14, persons engaged in agriculture in Khargram CD block could be classified as follows: bargadars 6,816 (7.12%,) patta (document) holders 10,104 (10.56%), small farmers (possessing land between 1 and 2 hectares) 4,230 (4.42%), marginal farmers (possessing land up to 1 hectare) 26,180 (27.36%) and agricultural labourers 48,349 (50.53%).

Khargram CD block had 114 fertiliser depots, 2 seed stores and 63 fair price shops in 2013-14.

In 2013-14, Khargram CD block produced 72,974 tonnes of Aman paddy, the main winter crop from 25,198 hectares, 51,158 tonnes of Boro paddy (spring crop) from 14,290 hectares, 125 tonnes of wheat from 24 hectares, 41 tonnes of jute from 4 hectares, 6,741 tonnes of potatoes from 225 hectares and 4,845 tonnes of sugar cane from 60 hectares. It also produced pulses and oilseeds.

In 2013-14, the total area irrigated in Khargram CD block was 13,447 hectares, out of which 7,089 hectares were irrigated by canal water, 2,187 hectares with tank water, 118 hectares by river lift irrigation, 40 hectares by deep tube wells, and 4,013 hectares by other means.

=== Silk and handicrafts ===
Murshidabad is famous for its silk industry since the Middle Ages. There are three distinct categories in this industry, namely (i) Mulberry cultivation and silkworm rearing (ii) Peeling of raw silk (iii) Weaving of silk fabrics. Prime locations for weaving (silk and cotton) are: Khargram, Raghunathganj I, Nabagram, Beldanga I, Beldanga II and Raninagar-I CD blocks.

Ivory carving is an important cottage industry from the era of the Nawabs. The main areas where this industry has flourished are Khagra and Jiaganj. 99% of ivory craft production is exported. In more recent years sandalwood etching has become more popular than ivory carving. Bell metal and Brass utensils are manufactured in large quantities at Khagra, Berhampore, Kandi and Jangipur. Beedi making has flourished in the Jangipur subdivision.

=== Banking ===
In 2013-14, Khargram CD block had offices of 11 commercial banks and 1 gramin bank.

=== Backward Regions Grant Fund ===
Murshidabad district is listed as a backward region and receives financial support from the Backward Regions Grant Fund. The fund, created by the Government of India, is designed to redress regional imbalances in development. As of 2012, 272 districts across the country were listed under this scheme. The list includes 11 districts of West Bengal.

== Transport ==
Khargram CD block has 9 ferry services and 11 originating/ terminating bus routes. The nearest railway station is 45 km from the CD block headquarters.

SH 7 running from Rajgram (in Birbhum district) to Midnapore (in Paschim Medinipur district) passes through this CD block.

== Education ==
In 2013-14, Khargram CD block had 148 primary schools with 16,885 students, 14 middle schools with 1,610 students, 14 high school with 9,603 students and 15 higher secondary schools with 15,179 students. Khargram CD block had 1 general college with 1,676 students, and 421 institutions for special and non-formal education with 19,862 students.

Nagar College was established in 1998 at Nagar. Affiliated to the University of Kalyani, it offers honours courses in Bengali, English, Sanskrit, Arabic, philosophy, political science, history, geography and mathematics.

In Khargram CD block, amongst the 138 inhabited villages, 6 villages do not have a school, 64 villages have more than 1 primary school, 55 villages have at least 1 primary and 1 middle school and 29 villages had at least 1 middle and 1 secondary school.

== Healthcare ==
In 2014, Khargram CD block had 1 rural hospital, 4 primary health centres and 1 private nursing home with total 92 beds and 6 doctors (excluding private bodies). It had 38 family welfare subcentres. 10,450 patients were treated indoor and 135,786 patients were treated outdoor in the hospitals, health centres and subcentres of the CD Block.

Khargram CD block has Khargram Rural Hospital at Khargram (with 50 beds), Margram Primary Health Centre (with 10 beds), Jhili PHC at Nonadanga (with 10 beds), Parulia PHC at Debiparulia (with 10 beds) and Indrani PHC (with 2 beds)

Khargram CD block is one of the areas of Murshidabad district where ground water is affected by moderate level of arsenic contamination. The WHO guideline for arsenic in drinking water is 10 mg/ litre, and the Indian Standard value is 50 mg/ litre. All but one of the 26 blocks of Murshidabad district have arsenic contamination above the WHO level, all but two of the blocks have arsenic concentration above the Indian Standard value and 17 blocks have arsenic concentration above 300 mg/litre. The maximum concentration in Khargram CD block is 75 mg/litre.
