= Md. Mostafijur Rahaman =

Indian politician

- মোঃ মোস্তাফিজুর রহমান

Member of the West Bengal Legislative Assembly
- Incumbent
- Assumed office 4 May 2026
- Preceded by: Jafikul Islam
- Constituency: Domkal

Personal details
- Born: Murshidabad
- Party: Communist Party of India (Marxist)
- Spouse: Dipanwita Chowdhury
- Children: 2 (1 son, 1 daughter)
- Parents: Asraful Islam (father); Setara Bibi (mother)
- Education: Master of Arts (2012)
- Alma mater: Kalyani University
- Profession: Politician

Md. Mostafijur Rahaman is an Indian politician from West Bengal, India. He is a member of Communist Party of India (Marxist). Currently he is representing Domkal Assembly constituency in West Bengal Legislative Assembly. In 2026 West Bengal Legislative Assembly election he defeated Minister of State Humayun Kabir of Trinamool Congress by the margin of 16,296 votes.
