= Nagar, Murshidabad =

Nagar
- Village
- Location in West Bengal, India Nagar (India)
- Coordinates: 24°05′30″N 87°59′17″E
- Country: India
- State: West Bengal
- District: Murshidabad
- Elevation: 18 m (59 ft)

Population (2011)
  - Total: 11,882

Languages
  - Official: Bengali, English
- Time zone: UTC+5:30 (IST)
- PIN: 742159 (Nagar)
- Telephone/STD code: 03484-xxx
- Website: murshidabad.gov.in

Nagar is a village in the Khargram CD block in the Kandi subdivision of Murshidabad district in the state of West Bengal, India. It is located about 190 km from Kolkata, the state capital.

== Geography ==
Cities, towns and locations in the Berhampore and Kandi subdivisions, Murshidabad district
M: municipal town, CT: census town, R: rural/ urban centre, H: historical centres
Owing to space constraints in the small map, the actual locations in a larger map may vary slightly

=== Location ===
Nagar is located at 24.08980°N 87.99023°E

=== Area overview ===
The area shown in the map alongside, covering Berhampore and Kandi subdivisions, is spread across both the natural physiographic regions of the district, Rarh and Bagri. The headquarters of Murshidabad district, Berhampore, is in this area. The ruins of Karnasubarna, the capital of Shashanka, the first important king of ancient Bengal who ruled in the 7th century, is located 9.6 kilometres (6.0 mi) south-west of Berhampore. The entire area is overwhelmingly rural with over 80% of the population living in the rural areas.

Note: The map alongside presents some of the notable locations in the subdivisions. All places marked in the map are linked in the larger full screen map.

== Demographics ==
According to the 2011 Census of India, Nagar had a total population of 11,882, of which 6,198 (52%) were males and 5,684 (48%) were females. Population in the age range 0–6 years was 1,472. The total number of literate persons in Nagar was 7,096 (68.17% of the population over 6 years).

== Civic administration ==
=== CD block HQ ===
The headquarters of Khargram CD block are located at Nagar.

== Transport ==
State Highway 7 (Badshahi Road) passes through Nagar. National Highway 116A passess through west side of Nagar, Connecting Kharagpur to Siliguri(Part of Kharagpur-Siliguri Economic Corridor).

== Education ==
=== Colleges ===
- Nagar College was established in 1998 at Nagar. Affiliated to the University of Kalyani, it offers honours courses in Bengali, English, Sanskrit, Arabic, philosophy, political science, history, geography and mathematics.

== Tourism ==
There is a mosque named 'Nagar Jame Masjid', is one of the largest mosques of Murshidabad. Nagar Fair is arranged every year on 5 January in the Pirtala ground which is located near Nagar Dighi, for Data Pir.
