= Dumkal College =

B Grade Accredited College by NAAC

- Type: Undergraduate college Public college
- Established: 1999; 27 years ago
- Affiliations: University of Kalyani
- Principal: Dr. Bhabesh Pramanik
- Location: Basantapur, Domkal, Murshidabad, West Bengal, 742303, India
- Website: https://dumkalcollege.in/

Dumkal College, was founded on 21 September 1999 by the order of the Government of West Bengal in Domkal, Murshidabad. The college starts its functioning with a handful of students initiating their classes in B.T High School, Dumkal. This is a co-education college and the only institution within the locality which ran from the very beginning with all the three streams: Arts, Science and Commerce. It is affiliated to the University of Kalyani.

== Location ==
The college is located in Basantapur, a remote village near the Indo - Bangladesh border in Dumkal subdivision. The college is connected by a road coming from Dumkal Bus Stand. It is, therefore, conveniently connected with both Berhampore and Jalangi by road.

== Departments ==
=== Science ===
- Chemistry
- Computer Science
- Mathematics
- Physics

=== Arts and Commerce ===
- Bengali
- Commerce
- Economics
- English
- Geography
- History
- Philosophy
- Political Science
- Sanskrit

== Facilities ==
=== Library ===
The college library has a vast collection of text books, references, rare books and useful journals. The library is mainly founded by U.G.C. grants (M.P. and M.L.A. funds), State Government grants available from time to time and the college fund as well. Some departments have seminar libraries where students can interact with the teachers directly.

=== Laboratories ===
The college has well-equipped laboratories for the departments of Physics, Chemistry, Geography, Computer Science and Mathematics. The laboratories have recently been renovated and modernized to meet the demands of the latest syllabi. A number of Computers have been installed in the departments. Some departments are equipped with modern teaching aids like overhead projectors and audio system.

=== Sports & Games ===
The college has a spacious common room for students will the facility of Indoor games. The college regularly participate in various outdoor sports, such as Football, Cricket, and athletics in different levels. The college regularly holds the annual sports during winter. The Students, Union of the college plays a major role in arranging and conducting the various games and other sporting activities.

=== Academic Tour ===
The educational tour of Geography and Environmental studies departments are arranged by the concerned department in every academic year. Tours are compulsory and part of the curriculum.

=== Scholarships ===
Depending on their results, the students of the college will be able to apply for the Scholarship like National Scholarship, S.C, S.T, O.B.C scholarship and grants from College.

=== Canteen or Common Room ===
The college has two spacious students common rooms, one for Boys and another for Girls, and a Canteen for all.

=== Students Health Home ===
All students of the college are member of students of Health Home, and they can get all sort of medical facilities from the same.

=== College Magazine ===
The college magazine is published annually with the objective of nourishing and giving an exposure to the literary prowess of the students. Regular publication of wall magazine is also a platform for the students to express their literary talent and innovative thinking. College authority has taken a plan for the publication of College Journal with ISBN no.

=== National Service Scheme (N.S.S) ===
Dumkal College participates in the National Service Scheme under Kalyani University, sponsored by the Ministry of Human Resources Development, Government of India. A Programme Officer, assisted by an Advisory Committee, oversees the NSS activities. Every year, volunteers from among the students are enrolled and after completion of 120 hours of work, certificates are awarded by the college. Regular programme different relevant aspects are going on the special camps under NSS scheme.

=== Free & Half Free Studentship ===
These facilities extended to a very limited number of students on the basis of their results in previous examination, regular attendance in the classes. Along with their economical condition at present, only to poor but highly meritorious students as verified and recommended by teachers of specified departments.

== Accreditation ==
Dumkal College was awarded a 'B' grade by the National Assessment and Accreditation Council (NAAC). The college is recognized by the University Grants Commission (UGC).

== See also ==
- List of institutions of higher education in West Bengal
- Education in India
- Education in West Bengal
