= Panchthupi =

- Village
- Location in West Bengal, India Panchthupi (India)
- Coordinates: 23.8898°N 87.9889°E
- Country: India
- State: West Bengal
- District: Murshidabad

Population (2011)
  - Total: 7,956

Languages
  - Official: Bengali, English
- Time zone: UTC+5:30 (IST)
- PIN: 742161 (Panchthupi)
- Telephone/STD code: 03484
- Lok Sabha constituency: Baharampur
- Vidhan Sabha constituency: Burwan
- Website: murshidabad.gov.in

Panchthupi (also spelled Panch Thupi) is a village in the Burwan CD block in the Kandi subdivision of Murshidabad district in the state of West Bengal, India.

== Geography ==
Cities, towns and locations in the Berhampore and Kandi subdivisions, Murshidabad district
M: municipal town, CT: census town, R: rural/ urban centre, H: historical centres
Owing to space constraints in the small map, the actual locations in a larger map may vary slightly

=== Location ===
Panchthupi is located at 23.8898°N 87.9889°E.

=== Area overview ===
The area shown in the map alongside, covering Berhampore and Kandi subdivisions, is spread across both the natural physiographic regions of the district, Rarh and Bagri. The headquarters of Murshidabad district, Berhampore, is in this area. The ruins of Karnasubarna, the capital of Shashanka, the first important king of ancient Bengal who ruled in the 7th century, is located 9.6 kilometres (6.0 mi) south-west of Berhampore. The entire area is overwhelmingly rural with over 80% of the population living in the rural areas.

Note: The map alongside presents some of the notable locations in the subdivisions. All places marked in the map are linked in the larger full screen map.

== Demographics ==
According to the 2011 Census of India, Panch Thupi had a total population of 7,956, of which 4,092 (51%) were males and 3,864 (50%) were females. Population in the age range 0–6 years was 1,117. The total number of literate persons in Panch Thupi was 4,445 (64.99% of the population over 6 years).

== Transport ==
Dak Bangla Road links Panchthupi to State Highway 7 running from Rajgram (in Birbhum district) to Midnapore (in Paschim Medinipur district).

== Education ==
- Panchthupi Haripada Gouribala College was established in 1996 at Panchthupi. Affiliated with the University of Kalyani.
- Sunil Dhar Memorial B.P.Ed. College, a college for physical education, was established at Panchthupi in 2007.
- Panchthupi T.N. Institution which was established in 1904 by Troilokya nath Adhikari.
- Sri Sri Ram Krishna Sarada Balika Vidyapith, established in 1954.

== Culture ==
There is a group of mounds, possibly five, indicating the remains of a stupa, as signified by the name Panchthupi. It is known as Barkona Deul Mound.

According to the List of Monuments of National Importance in West Bengal, the mound known as Barkona Deul Mound at Panchthupi is an ASI listed monument.

== Healthcare ==
There is a Primary Health Centre at Panchthupi (with 10 beds).
