= Khargram Assembly constituency =

Legislative assembly constituency in West Bengal, India

Khargram
- Constituency No. 66 for the West Bengal Legislative Assembly
- Interactive Map Outlining Khargram Assembly Constituency

Constituency details
- Country: India
- Region: East India
- State: West Bengal
- District: Murshidabad
- Lok Sabha constituency: Jangipur
- Established: 1951
- Total electors: 228,923
- Reservation: SC

Member of Legislative Assembly
- 18th West Bengal Legislative Assembly
- Incumbent Mitali Mal
- Party: BJP
- Alliance: NDA
- Elected year: 2026

Khargram Assembly constituency is an assembly constituency in Murshidabad district in the Indian state of West Bengal. It is reserved for scheduled castes.

== Overview ==
As per orders of the Delimitation Commission, No. 66 Khargram Assembly constituency (SC) covers Khargram community development block, and Kalyanpur I and Kalyanpur II gram panchayats Burwan community development block.

Khargram Assembly constituency is part of No. 9 Jangipur Lok Sabha constituency.

== Members of the Legislative Assembly ==
Year	Name	Party
1951	Satyendra Chandra Ghosh Moulik (Burwan–Khargram)	Indian National Congress
1951	Sudhir Mondal (Burwan–Khargram)	Indian National Congress
1957	No seat	
1962	Abhayapada Saha	Revolutionary Socialist Party
1967	S.K. Mondal	Indian National Congress
1969	Kumarish Chandra Moulik	Revolutionary Socialist Party
1971	Narendra Haldar	Indian National Congress
1972	Harendranath Halder	Indian National Congress
1977	Dinabandhu Majhi	Communist Party of India (Marxist)
1982	Dinabandhu Majhi	Communist Party of India (Marxist)
1987	Biswanath Mondal	Communist Party of India (Marxist)
1991	Biswanath Mondal	Communist Party of India (Marxist)
1996	Biswanath Mondal	Communist Party of India (Marxist)
2001	Biswanath Mondal	Communist Party of India (Marxist)
2006	Manabendranath Saha	Communist Party of India (Marxist)
2011	Ashish Marjit	Indian National Congress
2016	Ashish Marjit	Indian National Congress
2021	Ashish Marjit	Trinamool Congress
2026	Mitali Mal	Bharatiya Janata Party

== Election results ==
=== 2026 ===
2026 West Bengal Legislative Assembly election: Khargram
Party	Candidate	Votes	%	±%
BJP	Mitali Mal	77,748	38.02	▲5.38
AITC	Ashish Marjit	68,415	33.46	▼16.69
CPI(M)	Dhrubajoti Saha	41,944	20.51	
INC	Mander Kanti Mondal	11,009	5.38	▼9.37
NOTA	None of the above	1,879	0.92	▲0.01
Majority		9,333	4.56	▼12.95
Turnout		204,477	88.49	▲7.27
BJP gain from AITC		Swing		

=== 2021 ===
2021 West Bengal Legislative Assembly election: Khargram
Party	Candidate	Votes	%	±%
AITC	Ashish Marjit	93,255	50.15	▲15.71
BJP	Aditya Moulik	60,682	32.64	▲27.08
INC	Bipad Taran Bagdi	27,423	14.75	▼40.18
NOTA	None of the above	1,685	0.91	
Majority		32,573	17.51	
Turnout		185,936	81.22	
AITC gain from INC		Swing		

=== 2016 ===
2016 West Bengal Legislative Assembly election: Khargram
Party	Candidate	Votes	%	±%
INC	Ashish Marjit	88,913	54.93	▲4.97
AITC	Madhab Chandra Marjit	55,740	34.44	New entry
BJP	Sumanta Mondal	9,004	5.56	▲2.83
WPI	Swapan Das	2,439	1.51	New entry
NOTA	None of the above	1,870	1.16	New entry
Majority		33,173	20.49	▲14.44
Turnout		1,61,860	79.30	▼6.44
INC hold		Swing		

=== 2011 ===
2011 West Bengal Legislative Assembly election: Khargram
Party	Candidate	Votes	%	±%
INC	Ashish Marjit	74,093	49.96	
CPI(M)	Goutam Mondal	65,123	43.91	
BJP	Harekrishna Konai	4,049	2.73	
Independent	Smritikana Sarkar	2,369	1.60	
CPI(ML)L	Sadhan Kumar Marjit	1,616	1.09	
JD(U)	Dipak Mandal	1,049	0.71	
Majority		8,970	6.05	
Turnout		1,48,299	85.74	
INC gain from CPI(M)		Swing		

=== 2006 ===
In the 2006 state assembly elections, Manabendranath Saha of CPI(M) won the 66 Khargram (SC) seat defeating his nearest rival Ashis Marjit of Congress. Contests in most years were multi cornered but only winners and runners are being mentioned. Biswanath Mondal of CPI(M) defeated Madhab Chandra Marjit of Congress in 2001 and 1996, Harendranath Haldar of Congress in 1991, and Ashok Saha of Congress in 1987. Dinabandhu Majhi of CPI(M) defeated Nakari Chandra Majhi of Congress in 1982 and Harendranath Haldar of Congress in 1977.

=== 1972 ===
Harendranath Halder of Congress won in 1972. Narendra Haldar of Congress won in 1971. Kumarish Chandra Moulick of RSP won in 1969. S.K.Mondal of Congress won in 1967. Abhayapada Saha of RSP won in 1962. The Khargram seat was not there in 1957. In independent India's first election in 1951 Burwan Khargram was a joint seat Satyendra Chandra Ghosh Moulik and Sudhir Mondal, both of Congress, jointly won the Burwan Khargram seat.
