= Domkal Assembly constituency =

Domkal
- Constituency No. 75 for the West Bengal Legislative Assembly
- Interactive Map Outlining Domkal Assembly Constituency

Constituency details
- Country: India
- Region: East India
- State: West Bengal
- District: Murshidabad
- Lok Sabha constituency: Murshidabad
- Established: 1967
- Total electors: 266,283
- Reservation: None

Member of Legislative Assembly
- 18th West Bengal Legislative Assembly
- Incumbent Md. Mostafijur Rahaman
- Party: CPI(M)
- Alliance: LF
- Elected year: 2026

Domkal Assembly constituency is an assembly constituency in Murshidabad district in the Indian state of West Bengal.

Most Successful parties from Domkal Assembly constituency
1. Communist Party of India (Marxist) (12 times) (80.0%)
2. Indian National Congress (4 times) (13.3%)
3. Trinamool Congress(1 time) (6.66%)

== Overview ==
As per orders of the Delimitation Commission, No. 75 Domkal Assembly constituency covers Ajimganjgola, Bhagirathpur, Domkal, Garaimari, Garibpur, Ghoramara, Jitpur, Juginda, Juranpur, Madhurkul, Raipur and Sarangpur gram panchayats of Domkal community development block.

Domkal Assembly constituency is part of No. 11 Murshidabad Lok Sabha constituency.

== Members of the Legislative Assembly ==
Year	Name	Party
1967	Mohammad Abdul Bari	Communist Party of India (Marxist)
1969	Ekramul Hoque Biswas	Indian National Congress
1971	Mohammad Abdul Bari	Communist Party of India (Marxist)
1972	Ekramul Hoque Biswas	Indian National Congress
1977	Mohammad Abdul Bari	Communist Party of India (Marxist)
1982	Mohammad Abdul Bari	Communist Party of India (Marxist)
1987	Mohammad Abdul Bari	Communist Party of India (Marxist)
1991	Anisur Rahman	Communist Party of India (Marxist)
1996	Anisur Rahman	Communist Party of India (Marxist)
2001	Anisur Rahman	Communist Party of India (Marxist)
2006	Anisur Rahman	Communist Party of India (Marxist)
2011	Anisur Rahman	Communist Party of India (Marxist)
2016	Anisur Rahman	Communist Party of India (Marxist)
2021	Jafikul Islam	Trinamool Congress
2026	Mohammad Mostafijur Rahaman	Communist Party of India (Marxist)

== Election results ==
=== 2026 ===
2026 West Bengal Legislative Assembly election: Domkal
Party	Candidate	Votes	%	±%
CPI(M)	Md. Mostafijur Rahaman	107,882	41.85	▲6.28
AITC	Humayun Kabir	91,586	35.53	▼20.92
INC	Sahnaz Begum	30,453	11.81	New
BJP	Nanda Dulal Pal	13,180	5.11	▼0.35
AJUP	Mohammad Mosharaf Hossain	7,392	2.87	New
NOTA	None of the above	1,207	0.47	▼0.6
Majority		16,296	6.32	▼14.56
Turnout		257,790	96.3	▲11.36
CPI(M) gain from AITC		Swing		

=== 2021 ===
2021 West Bengal Legislative Assembly election: Domkal
Party	Candidate	Votes	%	±%
AITC	Jafikul Islam	127,671	56.45	
CPI(M)	Md. Mostafijur Rahaman	80,442	35.57	
BJP	Biyamma Mondal	12,348	5.46	
NOTA	None of the above	2,419	1.07	
Majority		47,229	20.88	
Turnout		226,183	84.94	
AITC gain from CPI(M)		Swing		

=== 2016 ===
West Bengal assembly elections, 2016: Domkal constituency
Party	Candidate	Votes	%	±%
CPI(M)	Anisur Rahaman	71,703	36.59	−10.63
AITC	Soumik Hossain	64,813	33.07	+33.07
INC	Abdur Rahaman Sekh	46,294	23.62	−21.83
BJP	Nanda Dulal Pal	4,652	2.37	+1.09
Independent	Abdur Rahaman Mandal	1,756	0.90	
NOTA	None of the above	1,580	0.81	+0.81
Turnout		1,95,962	83.80	−5.83
CPI(M) hold		Swing		

=== 2011 ===
2011 West Bengal Legislative Assembly election: Domkal
Party	Candidate	Votes	%	±%
CPI(M)	Anisur Rahaman	81,812	47.22	
INC	Soumik Hossain	78,737	45.45	
PDCI	Maulana Siddiqullah Chowdhury	4,922	2.84	
BJP	Santosh Mondal	2,215	1.28	
SUCI	Baijid Hossain	1,619	0.93	
IUML	Md. Salauddin	1,363	0.79	
Independent	Dipesh Sarkar	1,282	0.74	
BSP	Subodh Kumar Halder	864	0.50	
Independent	Apurba Sarkar	440	0.25	
Majority		3,075	1.77	
Turnout		173,254	89.52	
CPI(M) hold		Swing		

=== 2006 ===
2006 West Bengal Legislative Assembly election: Domkal
Party	Candidate	Votes	%	±%
CPI(M)	Anisur Rahaman	85,739	51.68	
INC	Rejaul Karim (Manik)	76,322	46.00	
Independent	Baijid Hossain	3,340	2.01	
Majority		9,417	5.68	
Turnout		165,908		
CPI(M) hold		Swing		

=== 2001 ===
2001 West Bengal Legislative Assembly election: Domkal
Party	Candidate	Votes	%	±%
CPI(M)	Anisur Rahaman Sarkar	78,151	52.83	
INC	Rejaul Karim (Manik)	65,042	43.97	
BJP	Samaul Alam	2,085	1.41	
Independent	Baijid Hossain	1,086	0.73	
Independent	Sader Ali Mondal	914	0.62	
Independent	Brindaban Halder	655	0.44	
Majority		13,109	8.86	
Turnout		148,022	82.19	
CPI(M) hold		Swing		

=== 1996 ===
1996 West Bengal Legislative Assembly election: Domkal
Party	Candidate	Votes	%	±%
CPI(M)	Anisur Rahaman	77,736	52.29	
INC	Sadeque Reza	62,896	42.31	
BJP	Prodyot Kumar Pal	2,977	2.00	
Independent	Sader Ali Mondal	2,049	1.38	
Independent	Baijwid Hossain	1,715	1.15	
IUML	Ashab Ali Ansari	688	0.46	
PBRML	Saikh Mohammad Abdur Rashid	593	0.40	
Majority		14,840	9.98	
Turnout		151,480	88.77	
CPI(M) hold		Swing		

=== 1991 ===
1991 West Bengal Legislative Assembly election: Domkal
Party	Candidate	Votes	%	±%
CPI(M)	Anesur Rahaman	67,535	55.97	
INC	Sarker Mokter Hossain	42,920	35.57	
BJP	Naryana Das Chakrabarti	6,867	5.69	
Independent	Mosharaf Hossain Biswas	1,856	1.54	
Independent	Sk. Abdur Rasid	1,106	0.92	
JP	Attarul Amria	374	0.31	
Majority		24,615	20.40	
Turnout		122,573	82.30	
CPI(M) hold		Swing		

=== 1987 ===
1987 West Bengal Legislative Assembly election: Domkal
Party	Candidate	Votes	%	±%
CPI(M)	Abdul Bari Mahammad	58,472	53.52	
INC	Ekramul Hoque Biswas	48,296	44.21	
SUCI	Mosharaf Hossain	1,536	1.41	
Independent	Mondal Israil	633	0.58	
Independent	Narendra Nath Biswas	313	0.29	
Majority		10,176	9.31	
Turnout		110,996	84.72	
CPI(M) hold		Swing		

=== 1982 ===
1982 West Bengal Legislative Assembly election: Domkal
Party	Candidate	Votes	%	±%
CPI(M)	Md. Abdul Bari	51,987	55.01	
IUML	A. K. M. Hazekul Alam	41,915	44.35	
Independent	Abdul Kader	599	0.63	
Majority		10,072	10.66	
Turnout		96,669	88.46	
CPI(M) hold		Swing		

=== 1977 ===
1977 West Bengal Legislative Assembly election: Domkal
Party	Candidate	Votes	%	±%
CPI(M)	Md. Abdul Bari	33,084	57.03	
INC	Ekramul Haque Biswas	18,240	31.44	
JP	Nagendra Nath Kundu	5,827	10.04	
IUML	Jiban Sultan Karikar	861	1.48	
Majority		14,844	25.59	
Turnout		59,041	64.98	
Swing to CPI(M) from INC		Swing		

=== 1972 ===
1972 West Bengal Legislative Assembly election: Domkal
Party	Candidate	Votes	%	±%
INC	Biswas Ekramul Haque	22,299	48.58	
CPI(M)	Md Abdul Bari	21,668	47.21	
IUML	Mandal Rafiluddin	1,932	4.21	
Majority		631	1.37	
Turnout		48,440	61.46	
Swing to INC from CPI(M)		Swing		

=== 1971 ===
1971 West Bengal Legislative Assembly election: Domkal
Party	Candidate	Votes	%	±%
CPI(M)	Md. Abdul Bari	17,338	41.12	
Independent	Maidul Islam Khondakar	12,078	28.65	
INC	Biswas Ekram Ul Haque	7,434	17.63	
SUCI	Md. Ashraf Ali	4,395	10.42	
ABJS	Sunil Brahmachari	915	2.17	
Majority		5,260	12.47	
Turnout		46,369	60.60	
Swing to CPI(M) from INC		Swing		

=== 1969 ===
1969 West Bengal Legislative Assembly election: Domkal
Party	Candidate	Votes	%	±%
INC	Biswas Ekram-ul-Haque	21,223	43.05	
CPI(M)	Mahammad Abdul Bari	20,988	42.58	
PML	Mallick Md. Booruddoza	5,465	11.09	
ABJS	Sunil Brahmachary	1,619	3.28	
Majority		235	0.47	
Turnout		50,691	68.28	
Swing to INC from CPI(M)		Swing		

=== 1967 ===
1967 West Bengal Legislative Assembly election: Domkal
Party	Candidate	Votes	%	±%
CPI(M)	M. A. Bari	26,277	60.59	
INC	A. B. Biswas	17,092	39.41	
Majority		9,185	21.18	
Turnout		46,533	62.77	
CPI(M) win (new seat)				
