= Domkal =

- Town
- Location in West Bengal, India Domkal (India)
- Coordinates: 24.132193°N 88.541695°E
- Country: India
- State: West Bengal
- District: Murshidabad

Government
  - Type: Municipality
  - Body: Domkal Municipality

Population (2011)
  - Total: 3,914

Languages
  - Official: Bengali, English
- Time zone: UTC+5:30 (IST)
- PIN: 742303
- Vehicle registration: WB
- Lok Sabha constituency: Murshidabad
- Vidhan Sabha constituency: Domkal
- Website: murshidabad.gov.in

Domkal is a town and a municipality of Murshidabad district in the Indian state of West Bengal. It is the headquarters of the Domkal Subdivision.

== Geography ==
Cities, towns and locations in the Lalbag and Domkal subdivisions, Murshidabad district
M: municipal town, CT: census town, R: rural/ urban centre, H: historical place
Owing to space constraints in the small map, the actual locations in a larger map may vary slightly

=== Area overview ===
While the Lalbag subdivision is spread across both the natural physiographic regions of the district, Rarh and Bagri, the Domkal subdivision occupies the north-eastern corner of Bagri. In the map alongside, the Ganges/ Padma River flows along the northern portion. The border with Bangladesh can be seen in the north and the east. Murshidabad district shares with Bangladesh a porous international border which is notoriously crime prone (partly shown in this map). The Ganges has a tendency to change course frequently, causing severe erosion, mostly along the southern bank. The historic city of Murshidabad, a centre of major tourist attraction, is located in this area. In 1717, when Murshid Quli Khan became Subahdar, he made Murshidabad the capital of Subah Bangla (then Bengal, Bihar and Odisha). The entire area is overwhelmingly rural with over 90% of the population living in the rural areas.

=== Location ===
Domkal is located at 24.132193°N 88.541695°E

== Demographics ==
According to the 2011 Census of India, Domkal had a total population of 3,914, of which 2,008 (51%) were males and 1,906 (49%) females. Population in the age range 0–6 years numbered 420. Scheduled Castes numbered 96 and Scheduled Tribes numbered 22.

=== Literacy ===
As per 2011 census the total number of literate persons in Domkal was 2,460 (70.40% of the population above 6 years), out of which 1,321 were males and 1,139 were females.

== Civic administration ==
=== Police station ===
Domkal police station has jurisdiction over Domkal CD block.

=== CD block HQ ===
The headquarters of Domkal CD block are located at Domkal.

== Transport ==
The State Highway 11 passes through the Domkal town. Bus services are available for Kolkata, district headquarters Berhampore and others town of Murshidabad. The nearest railway station is Cossimbazar railway station.

== Education ==
- Dumkal College was established in 1999 at Domkal. Affiliated with the University of Kalyani, it offers honours courses in Bengali, English, history, political science, philosophy, geography, physics, chemistry, mathematics, computer science and BCom.
- Dumkal Institute of Engineering & Technology, an Engineering College
- Domkal Girls' College was established in 2011 at Domkal. Affiliated with the University of Kalyani, it offers honours courses in Bengali, English, history, education and political science.
- Domkal Bhabataran High School established in 1900
- Domkal Balika Vidyapith established in 1965

== Healthcare ==
Domkal Subdivisional Hospital at Domkal functions with 68 beds.

Domkal Superspeciality Hospital is functional.

== See also ==
- Domkal (Community development block)
