= Murshidabad district =

District in West Bengal, India

- District of West Bengal
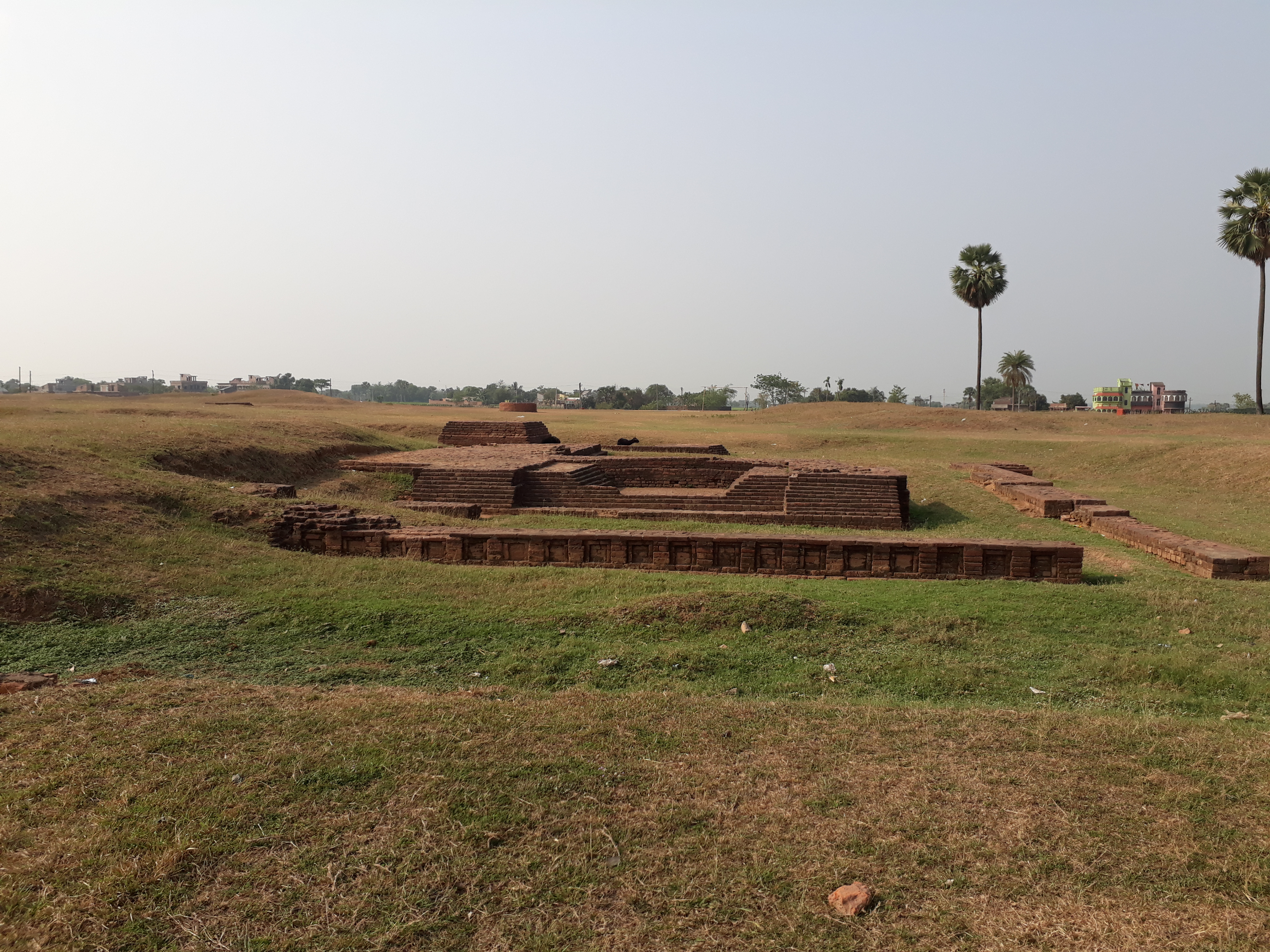
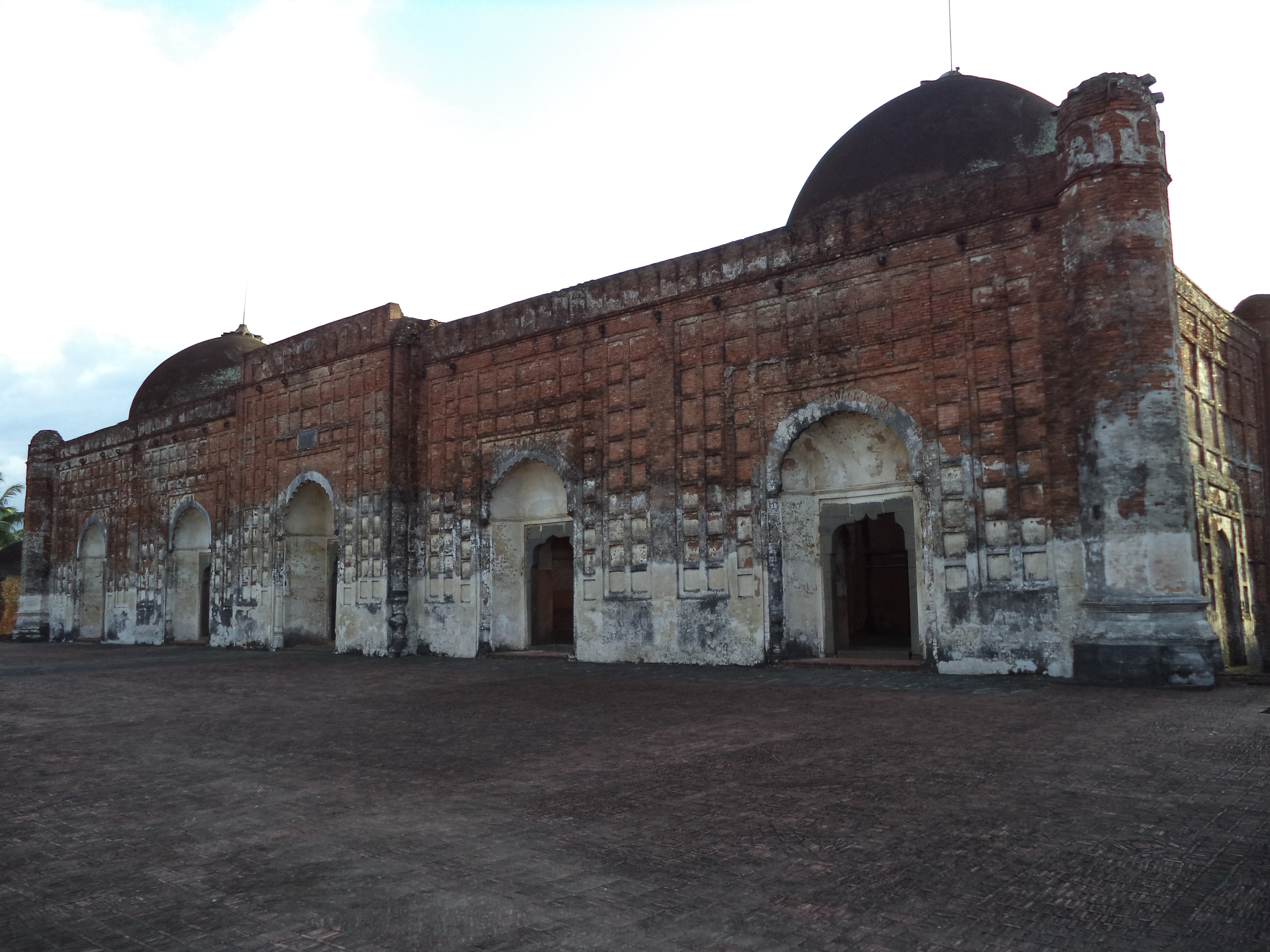
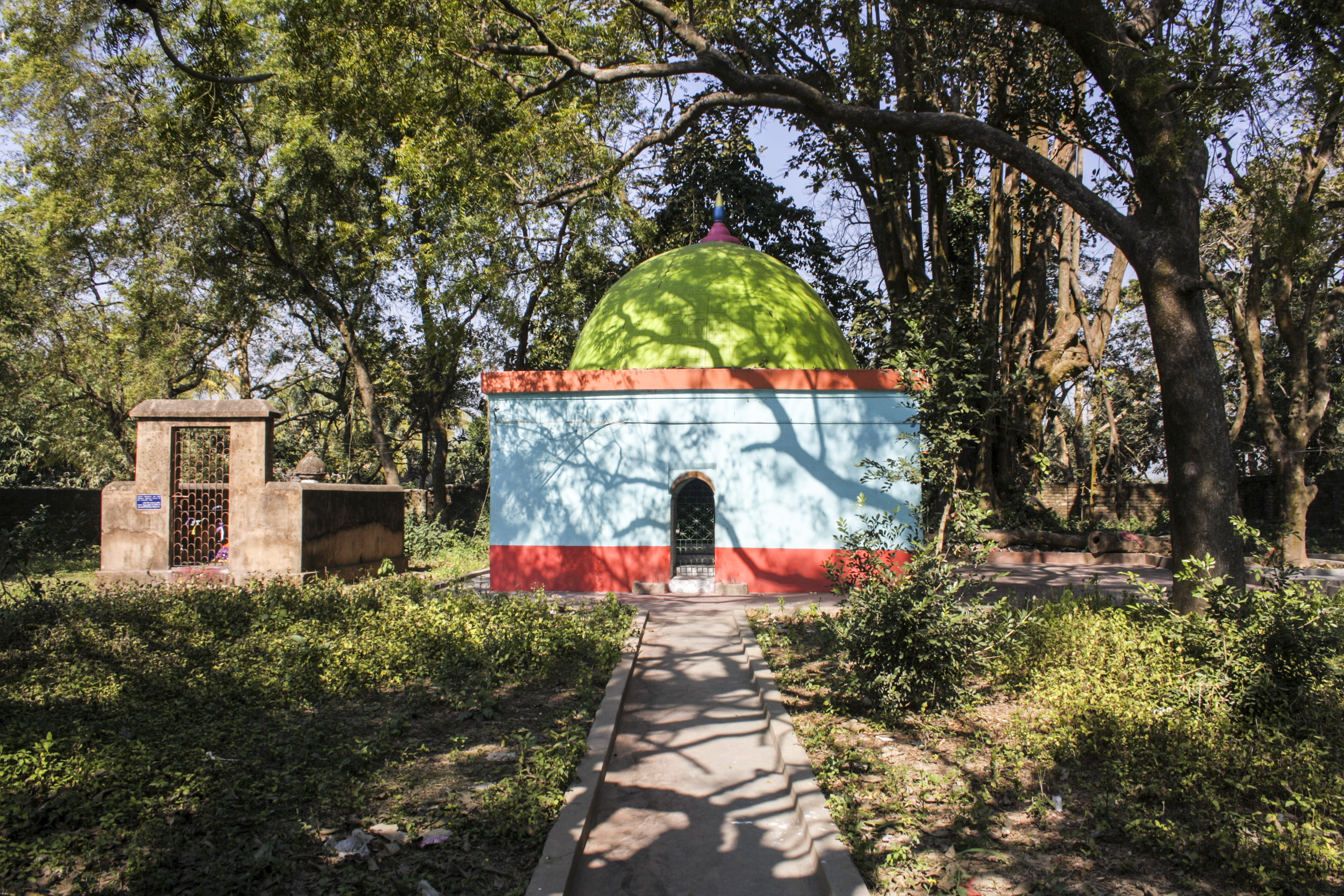
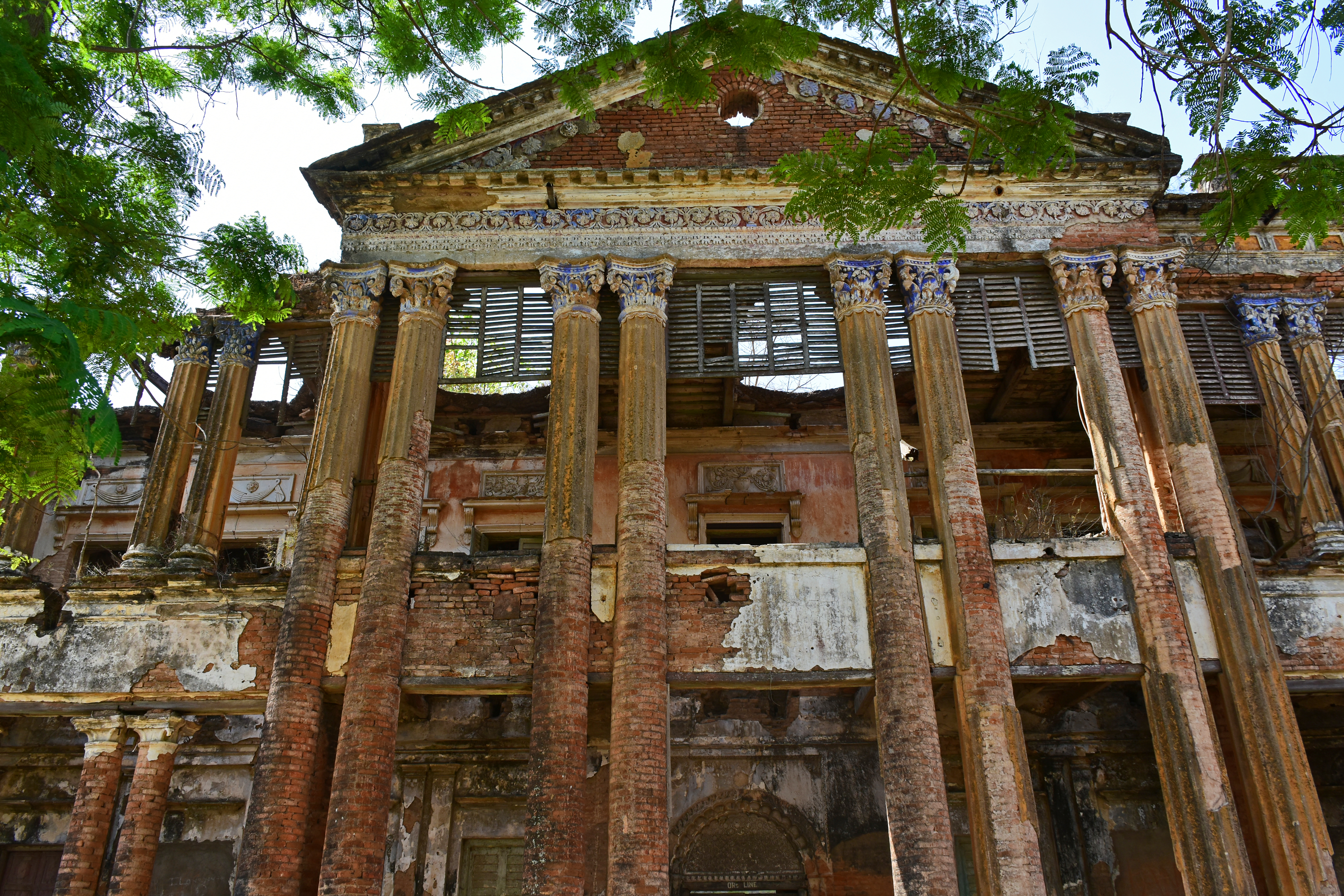
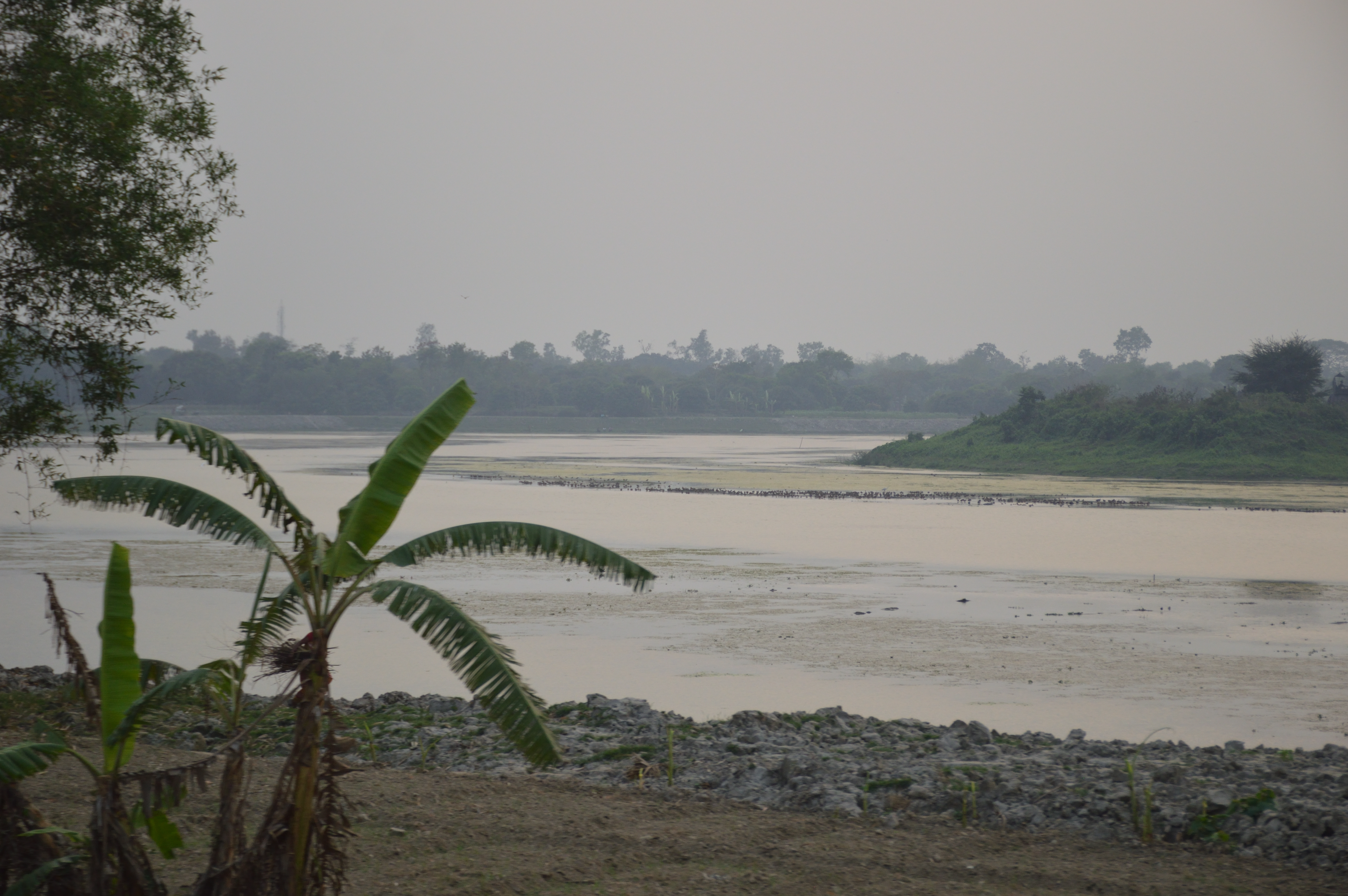
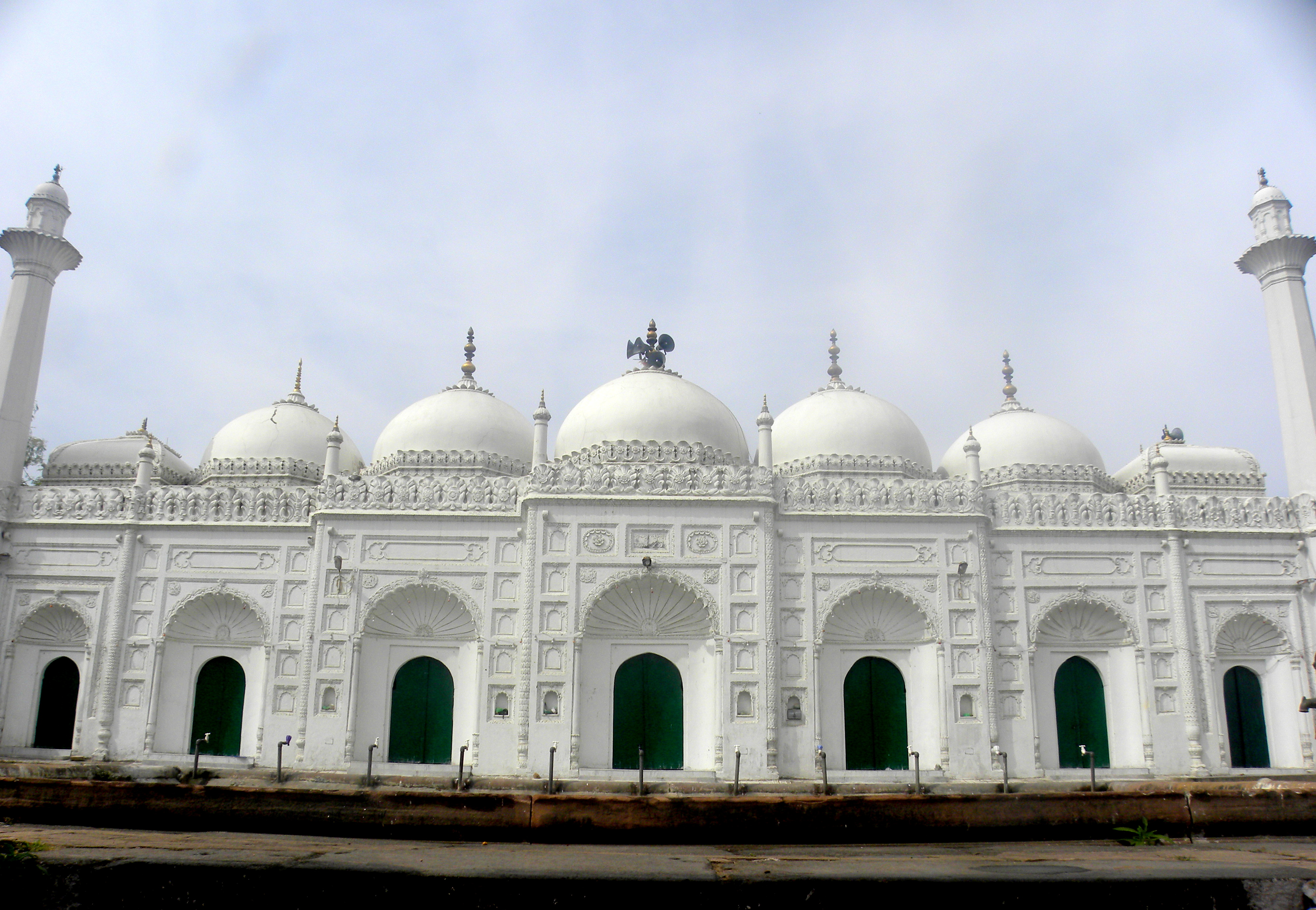
- Clockwise from top-left: Ruins of Karnasuvarna, Katra Masjid in Murshidabad, Nimtita Rajbari, Chawk Mosque, Motijheel Lake, Tomb of Mir Madan
- Interactive Map Outlining Murshidabad District
- Location of Murshidabad district in West Bengal
- Coordinates: 24°12′N 88°16′E
- Country: India
- State: West Bengal
- Division: Malda
- Headquarters: Berhampore

Government
  - Subdivisions: Berhampore Sadar, Domkal, Lalbag, Kandi, Jangipur
  - CD Blocks: Berhampore, Beldanga I, Beldanga II, Hariharpara, Naoda, Raninagar I, Raninagar II, Jalangi, Domkal, Murshidabad-Jiaganj, Bhagawangola I, Bhagawangola II, Lalgola, Nabagram, Kandi, Khargram, Burwan, Bharatpur I, Bharatpur II, Raghunathganj I, Raghunathganj II, Suti I, Suti II, Samserganj, Sagardighi, Farakka
  - Lok Sabha constituencies: Baharampur, Murshidabad, Jangipur
  - Vidhan Sabha constituencies: Farakka, Samserganj, Suti, Jangipur, Raghunathganj, Sagardighi, Lalgola, Bhagabangola, Raninagar, Murshidabad, Nabagram, Khargram, Burwan, Kandi, Bharatpur, Rejinagar, Beldanga, Baharampur, Hariharpara, Naoda, Domkal, Jalangi

Area
  - Total: 5,324 km^{2} (2,056 sq mi)

Population (2011)
  - Total: 7,103,807
  - Density: 1,334/km^{2} (3,456/sq mi)
  - Urban: 1,400,692

Demographics
  - Literacy: 62.59 per cent
  - Sex ratio: 958 ♂/♀

Languages
  - Official: Bengali
  - Additional official: English
- Time zone: UTC+5:30 (IST)
- Website: murshidabad.gov.in

Murshidabad district is a district in the Indian state of West Bengal. Situated on the left bank of the river Ganges, the district is very fertile. Covering an area of 5,341 km^{2} (2,062 sq mi) and having a population 7.103 million (according to 2011 census), it is a densely populated district and the ninth most populous in India (out of 640). Berhampore city is the headquarters of the district.

The Murshidabad city, which lends its name to the district, was the seat of power of the Nawabs of Bengal. All of Bengal was once governed from this city. A few years after Nawab Siraj-ud-Daula lost to the British at the Battle of Plassey, the capital of Bengal was moved to the newly founded city of Calcutta, now called Kolkata.

== Etymology ==
The district is named after the historical town of Murshidabad, which was named after Nawab Murshid Quli Khan.

== History ==
The capital city of Shashanka, the king of Gauḍa region (comprising most of Bengal) in the seventh century CE and perhaps that of Mahipala, one of the later Pala kings of Bengal, were in this district. The earliest evidences of the history of the district date back to the prehistoric days, perhaps as early as circa 1500 BCE.

The district got its present name in the early eighteenth century and its present shape in the later half of the eighteenth century. Murshidabad town, which lends its name to the district, derived its name from its founder, Murshid Quli Khan. The city, lying just east of the Bhagirathi River, is an agricultural trade and silk-weaving centre. Travellers marvelled at its glory through the ages. Originally called Makhsudabad, it was reportedly founded by the Mughal emperor Akbar in the 16th century. Kartalab Khan was appointed as Diwan of Bengal Subah in 1701 CE by Aurangzeb. He shifted his office from Dacca (present day Dhaka) to Maksudabad in 1702 CE. In 1703 CE, Aurangzeb honoured him with the title of Murshid Quli Khan and granted the permission to rename the city as Murshidabad in 1704 CE after his newly acquired title.

The Nawab Murshid Quli Khan made Murshidabad the capital city of Bengal Subah, comprising Bengal, Bihar, and Orissa. The family of Jagat Seth maintained their position as state bankers at Murshidabad from generation to generation. The East India Company reigned from here for many years after the Battle of Plassey.

Warren Hastings removed the supreme civil and criminal courts to Calcutta in 1772, but in 1775 the latter court was brought back to Murshidabad again. In 1790, under Charles Cornwallis, the entire revenue and judicial staffs were fixed at Calcutta. The city was still the residence of the nawab, who ranked as the first nobleman of the province with the style of Nawab Bahadur of Murshidabad, instead of Nawab Nazim of Bengal. The Hazarduari palace, dating from 1837, is a magnificent building in Italian style. The city still bears memories of Nawabs with other palaces, mosques, tombs, and gardens, and retains such industries as carving in ivory, gold and silver embroidery, and silk-weaving.

The Murshidabad District Committee of the Indian National Congress was formed in 1921 with Braja Bhusan Gupta as its first President. The Swadeshi movement and Quit India Movement were active in the district. Leaders Subhas Chandra Bose and Kazi Nazrul Islam were imprisoned in Berhampore, where Krishnath College educated revolutionaries Surya Sen and Niranjan Sengupta. The district saw the foundation of the Hindu Muslim Unity Association in 1937 by Wasif Ali Mirza, and the Revolutionary Socialist Party in 1940 by Tridib Choudhury.

On 15 August 1947, the Indian Independence Act 1947 came into force, and for the next two days Murshidabad, due to its Muslim majority, was part of the Dominion of Pakistan (specifically East Bengal or East Pakistan, which seceded as Bangladesh in 1971). On 17 August 1947, the final boundary adjustment of the Radcliffe Commission transferred Murshidabad to the Dominion of India (specifically West Bengal), to ensure the Hooghly River was entirely within India.

== Geography ==
It borders Malda district to the north, Jharkhand's Sahebganj district and to the north-west, Birbhum to the west, Bardhaman to the south-west and Nadia district due south. The international border with Bangladesh's Rajshahi division is on the east.

=== Landscape, rivers and vegetation ===
The district comprises two distinct regions separated by the Bhagirathi River. To the west lies the Rarh, a high, undulating continuation of the Chota Nagpur plateau. The eastern portion, the Bagri, is a fertile, low-lying alluvial tract, part of the Ganges Delta. The district is drained by the Bhagirathi and Jalangi rivers and their tributaries. Bhagirathi is a branch of the Ganges, and flows southwards from Farakka barrage where it originates from the Ganges. It flows southwards through the district and divides it into more or less equal halves. Dwarka River flows through Kandi and meet with Ganges.

Most of the land is arable, and used as agricultural land. Commonly seen trees are Neem, Mango, Jackfruit.

=== Climate ===
Murshidabad has a humid subtropical climate (Köppen climate classification). The annual mean temperature is approximately 27 °C; monthly mean temperatures range from 17 °C to 35 °C (approximate figures). Summers are hot and humid with temperatures in the low 30s and during dry spells the maximum temperatures often exceed 40 °C during May and June. Winter tends to last for only about two and a half months, with seasonal lows dipping to 9 °C – 11 °C between December and January. On an average, May is the hottest month with daily average temperatures ranging from a low of 27 °C to a maximum of 40 °C, while January the coldest month has temperatures varying from a low of 12 °C to a maximum of 23 °C. Often during early summer, dusty squalls followed by spells of thunderstorm or hailstorms and heavy rains cum ice sleets lash the district, bringing relief from the humid heat. These thunderstorms are convective in nature, and is locally known as Kal baisakhi (কালবৈশাখী, Nor'westers).

Rains brought by the Bay of Bengal branch of South-West monsoon lash the city between June and September and supplies the district with most of its annual rainfall of approx 1,600 mm (62 in). The highest rainfall occurs during the monsoon in August approx 300 mm (12 in). Floods are common during Monsoon, causing loss of life, destruction of property, and loss of crops.

== Economy ==
Most of the people depend on agriculture for their livelihood. There are some silk farms and some weaving machines, but they are losing out fast against the modern industries. Murshidabad is known for the quality silk produced here. Beedi industry is also there. Many of the India's major beedi companies are from this district.

Trade and business are conducted primarily with Asansol, Burdwan and Kolkata. There were some discussions between India and Bangladesh to open an internal water transport link between Dhulian and Rajshahi but it has not materialised yet.

In 2006 the Ministry of Panchayati Raj named Murshidabad one of the country's 250 most backward districts (out of a total of 640). It is one of the eleven districts in West Bengal currently receiving funds from the Backward Regions Grant Fund Programme (BRGF).

=== Agriculture ===
Rice, jute, legumes, oilseeds, wheat, barley, and mangoes are the chief crops in the east; extensive mulberry cultivation is carried out in the west. The district is known for the quality and diversity of Mango produced. However, Mango is not a major produce of the Murshidabad district, unlike the adjoining district of Malda.

=== Ivory and silk ===
The Ivory and Wood craft industry dates back to the time when the Nawabs of Bengal had their court at Murshidabad. As this industry was fully dependent for its prosperity on the support of a luxurious court and wealthy noblemen, it had to face a crisis when the Nawabs lost their power and their court disappeared.

=== Indian cork (shola) ===
Sholapith is a milky-white sponge-wood which is carved into delicate objects of art. Shola is a plant which grow wild in marshy waterlogged areas. The biological name of shola is Aeschynomene Indica or Aeschynomene Aspera (bean family) and it is a herbaceous plant. The sholapith is the cortex or core of the plant and is 1 1/2 inch in diameter. The outer harder brown skin is removed by expert hands to reveal the inner soft milky-white and spongy material, almost similar to "Thermocol", artificially produced in a laboratory. However, sholapith is much superior to thermocol in terms of malleability, texture, lustre and sponginess. Artisans use it for making artefacts used for decoration and ornate head-wears of bridal couple.

In Murshidabad the shola crafts are flowery designs, decorative head-wears of gods and goddesses, garlands, intricate figurines like faces of gods and goddesses, elephant-howdahs, peacock-boats, palanquins and so on are made of sholapith.

=== Bell metal works ===
Bell-metal and brass utensils are manufactured in large quantities at Khagra, Berhampore, Kandi, Baranagar and Jangipur. They are exported as well as sold in the local markets. Locks and betelnut cutters of a superior kind are made at Dhulian and iron chests at Jangipur. The problem of getting raw materials for the brass and bell-metal artisans of the district is, however, acute. While delay in getting raw materials owing to the complicated procedural formalities involved in the submission of applications for raw materials has been almost a constant factor, the industry has also been affected by the change in consumers demand in favour of stainless steel, plastic and ceramic goods and crockery.

=== Heavy industries ===
The District is having the largest Power Plant at Sagardighi 12 km from Raghunathganj, it also having a Central power plant at Farraka NTPC Generating 1600MW power. A Hydropower project is upcoming in the district. The District is the largest manufacturer of Bidi and many women from the district are involved in manufacturing Bidi.

=== Silk and sari ===
The Baluchari sarees are figured silk saree produced in the town of Baluchar in Murshidabad district. Baluchar sarees essentially have a silk base with silk brocaded designs with respect to their colours, where in spite of a rich composition, the Baluchar bootidars almost avoid strong contrasts. Each pattern is treated in a colour which harmonises with the ground on which it is laid. The most popular colours used are red, blue, yellow, green and scarlet. The Baluchari sarees have large floral motifs interspersed with flowering shrubs. Traditionally the Muslim community was also known to produce these Baluchars with figured patterns depicting court scenes, horse with a rider, women smoking hookah. The Kalka design or the cone motif is often surrounded with floral borders.

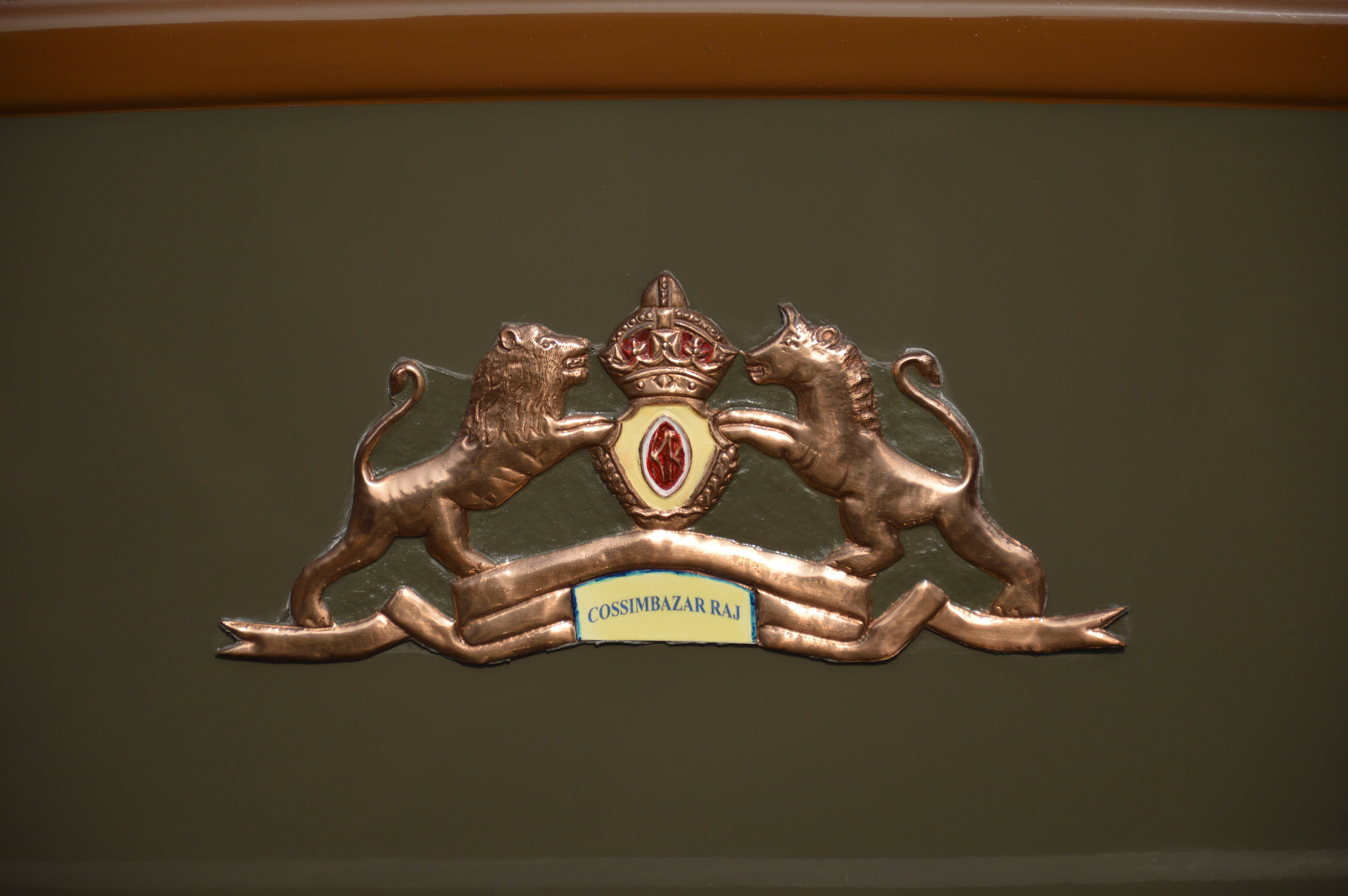
Cossimbazar Raj Logo

Bengal had a nourishing silk industry in the past and Murshidabad long enjoyed a special reputation in this respect. The Bengal silk manufactures formed one of the important exports of the English East India Company to England, and these were exported also to the markets in the Asiatic countries. After the establishment of English factories at Malda and Cossimbazar, the English Company's trade in Bengal silk manufactures began to increase, and their use became common among the people in England because of their good quality and cheapness. In the mid-eighteenth century the country round about it (Cossimbazar) was very fertile, and the inhabitants remarkably industrious, being employed in many useful manufactures. About 1663 AD, the Dutch in their Cossimbazar factory sometimes employed 700 silk weavers, and the English and the other European nations smaller number. There was considerable demand for Bengal's raw silk in England's markets as the Continental System occasioned an entire cessation of the customary importations of the Italian raw silk. Murshidabad has always had a high reputation for its quality of silk and that was one of the primary exports that the English East India Company made to England. Murshidabad has had a long association with the silk industry particularly during the times of the English East India company, which saw the emergence of two English factories to spruce up the production of silk as there was a growing demand in England owing to the cheaper prices and superior quality, particularly during a time when the Italians started charging additional cess.

At present, Murshidabad is a hub for sericulture and handicrafts.

== Transport ==
Surface transport (road and rail) is the most important way of transport. Even though a major river runs through the district (Bhagirathi), water transport is not very common, even though small boats ferry people across rivers where no bridge is available. one main bridge name Ramendrasundar Tribedi.

=== Road ===
Buses are the most common form of transport, and they are easily available, and run to a wide range of destinations within and without the district. Bus transport is cheap (For example, a journey of 182 km to Kolkata from Baharampur costs about Rs. 135) Trucks carry majority of goods transported in the district. Overloaded trucks on the road are also a common sight, and they are a major reason roads are in bad condition.

=== Rail ===
There are two major rail routes in this district. Both the major lines run in the North–South direction and connects the district to Kolkata.

- Barharwa-Azimganj-Katwa Loop, it also connects the district with North Bengal.
- Ranaghat-Krishnanagar-Lalgola Loop

There is also a branch line, Nalhati–Azimganj branch line, that branches out from the former one at Azimganj and connects the Sahibganj loop at Nalhati (Birbhum).

Nashipur Rail Bridge is an ongoing project that will connect the two major routes of the district between Murshidabad Railway Station and Azimganj Junction Railway Station across the Bhagirathi River. This when completed will reduce the travel time between South Bengal and North Bengal.

== Divisions ==
=== Administrative subdivisions ===
The district comprises five subdivisions: Barhampur, Domkal, Lalbag, Kandi and Jangipur. Other than municipality area, each subdivision contains community development blocks which in turn are divided into rural areas and census towns. In total there are 30 urban units: 8 municipalities and 22 census towns. The following are municipalities: Baharampur, Murshidabad, Jiaganj Azimganj, Beldanga, Domkal, Kandi, Jangipur, Dhulian. Baharampur and Kasim Bazar together form an urban agglomeration.

Barhampur consists of Baharampur municipality, Beldanga municipality, and five community development blocks: Berhampore, Beldanga I, Beldanga II, Hariharpara and Naoda.

Domkal subdivision consists of Domkal municipality and four community development blocks: Domkal, Raninagar I, Raninagar II and Jalangi.

Lalbag subdivision consists of Murshidabad municipality, Jiaganj-Azimganj municipality and five community development blocks: Murshidabad-Jiaganj, Bhagawangola I, Bhagawangola II, Lalgola and Nabagram.

Kandi subdivision consists of Kandi municipality and five community development blocks: Kandi, Khargram, Burwan, Bharatpur I and Bharatpur II.

Jangipur subdivision consists of Jangipur municipality, Dhulian municipality and seven community development blocks: Raghunathganj I, Raghunathganj II, Suti I, Suti II, Samserganj, Sagardighi and Farakka.

There are 26 police stations, 26 development blocks, 8 municipalities, 254 gram panchayats and 1937 villages in this district.

=== Assembly constituencies ===
As per order of the Delimitation Commission in respect of the delimitation of constituencies in the West Bengal, the district is now divided into 22 assembly constituencies: Farakka (AC #55), Samserganj (AC #56), Suti (AC #57), Jangipur (AC #58), Raghunathganj (AC #59), Sagardighi (AC #60), Lalgola (AC #61), Bhagabangola (AC #62), Raninagar (AC #63), Murshidabad (AC #64), Nabagram (AC #65), Khargram (AC#66), Burwan (AC#67), Kandi (AC#68), Bharatpur (AC#69), Rejinagar (AC#70), Beldanga (AC#71), Baharampur (AC#72), Hariharpara (AC#73), Naoda (AC#74), Domkal (AC#75) and Jalangi (AC #76). Nabagram, Khargram and Burwan constituencies will be reserved for Scheduled Castes (SC) candidates.

Farakka and Samserganj will be part of the newly formed Maldaha Dakshin (Lok Sabha constituency). Suti, Jangipur, Raghunathganj, Sagardighi, Lalgola, Nabagram and Khargram assembly segments will form the Jangipur (Lok Sabha constituency). Burwan, Kandi, Bharatpur, Rejinagar, Beldanga, Baharampur and Naoda constituencies will form the Baharampur (Lok Sabha constituency). Bhagabangola, Raninagar, Murshidabad, Hariharpara, Domkal and Jalanagi will be part of the Murshidabad (Lok Sabha constituency), which will also contain the Karimpur assembly constituency from the Nadia district.

Delimitation was made effective for all elections in the state of West Bengal that was to be held on or after 19 February 2008.

No.	Name	Lok Sabha	MLA	2026 Winner	2024 Lead
55	Farakka	Maldaha Dakshin	Motab Shaikh	Indian National Congress	Indian National Congress
56	Samserganj	Maldaha Dakshin	Mohammad Noor Alam	Trinamool Congress	Indian National Congress
57	Suti	Jangipur	Emani Biswas	Trinamool Congress	Trinamool Congress
58	Jangipur	Jangipur	Chitta Mukherjee	Bharatiya Janata Party	Bharatiya Janata Party
59	Raghunathganj	Jangipur	Akhruzzaman	Trinamool Congress	Trinamool Congress
60	Sagardighi	Jangipur	Bayron Biswas	Trinamool Congress	Trinamool Congress
61	Lalgola	Jangipur	Abdul Aziz	Trinamool Congress	Indian National Congress
62	Bhagabangola	Murshidabad	Reyat Hossain	Trinamool Congress	Trinamool Congress
63	Raninagar	Murshidabad	Julfikar Ali	Indian National Congress	Communist Party of India (Marxist)
64	Murshidabad	Murshidabad	Gouri Shankar Ghosh	Bharatiya Janata Party	Bharatiya Janata Party
65	Nabagram (SC)	Jangipur	Dilip Saha	Bharatiya Janata Party	Trinamool Congress
66	Khargram (SC)	Jangipur	Mitali Mal	Bharatiya Janata Party	Trinamool Congress
67	Burwan (SC)	Baharampur	Sukhen Kumar Bagdi	Bharatiya Janata Party	Bharatiya Janata Party
68	Kandi	Baharampur	Gargi Das Ghosh	Bharatiya Janata Party	Trinamool Congress
69	Bharatpur	Baharampur	Mustafizur Rahaman	Trinamool Congress	Trinamool Congress
70	Rejinagar	Baharampur	Shankharav Sarkar	Bharatiya Janata Party	Trinamool Congress
71	Beldanga	Baharampur	Bharat Kumar Jhawar	Bharatiya Janata Party	Trinamool Congress
72	Baharampur	Baharampur	Subrata Maitra	Bharatiya Janata Party	Indian National Congress
73	Hariharpara	Murshidabad	Niamot Sheikh	Trinamool Congress	Trinamool Congress
74	Naoda	Baharampur	Humayun Kabir	Aam Janata Unnayan Party	Trinamool Congress
75	Domkal	Murshidabad	Mohammad Mostafijur Rahaman	Communist Party of India (Marxist)	Trinamool Congress
76	Jalangi	Murshidabad	Babar Ali	Trinamool Congress	Trinamool Congress

=== Pre-delimitation scenario ===
The district was earlier divided into 19 assembly constituencies (AC): Farakka (AC #50), Aurangabad (AC #51), Suti (AC #52), Sagardighi (AC #53), Jangipur (AC #54), Lalgola (AC #55), Bhagabangola (AC #56), Nabagram (AC #57), Murshidabad (AC #58), Jalangi (AC #59), Domkal (AC#60), Naoda (AC#61), Hariharpara (AC#62), Berhampore (AC#63), Beldanga (AC#64), Kandi (AC#65), Khargram (AC#66), Barwan (AC#67) and Bharatpur (AC#68). The constituencies of Sagardighi and Khargram are reserved for Scheduled Castes (SC) candidates.

Farakka, Aurangabad, Suti, Sagardihi, Jangipur, Nabagram and Khargram assembly segments formed the Jangipur (Lok Sabha constituency). Lalgola, Bhagabangola, Murshidabad, Jalangi, Hariharpara and Mayureswar constituencies were part of the Murshidabad (Lok Sabha constituency), which also contained the Karimpur assembly constituency from the Nadia district. Naoda, Berhampore, Beldanga, Kandi, Barwan and Bharatpur were part of the Berhampore (Lok Sabha constituency), which also contained the Ketugram assembly constituency from the Bardhaman district.

== Demographics ==
Historical population
Year	Pop.	±%
1901	1,323,479	—
1911	1,346,069	+1.7%
1921	1,225,095	−9.0%
1931	1,371,604	+12.0%
1941	1,640,530	+19.6%
1951	1,717,229	+4.7%
1961	2,291,863	+33.5%
1971	2,946,563	+28.6%
1981	3,697,552	+25.5%
1991	4,740,149	+28.2%
2001	5,866,569	+23.8%
2011	7,103,807	+21.1%
Source: Census of India

According to the 2011 census Murshidabad district has a population of 7,103,807, roughly equal to the nation of Bulgaria or the US state of Washington. This gives it a ranking of 9th in India (out of a total of 640). The district has a population density of 1,334 inhabitants per square kilometre (3,460/sq mi) . Its population growth rate over the decade 2001-2011 was 21.07%. Murshidabad has a sex ratio of 957 females for 1000 every males, and a literacy rate of 67.53%. 19.72% of the population lives in urban areas. Scheduled Castes and Scheduled Tribes make up 12.63% and 1.28% of the population respectively.

As of 2001 India census, Murshidabad district had a population of 5,863,717 with a sex ratio of 952. A 23.70% growth of population and an increase of sex ratio by nine were noted since the previous census of 1991. The district has an area of 5,324 km^{2} (2,056 sq mi) and a population density of 1,101/km^{2} (2,850/sq mi) as per 2001 census data. The following table summarises the population distribution:

Rural/Urban	Area	Persons	Males	Females	Population density	Sex ratio
Total	5,324 km^{2} (2,056 sq mi)	3,015,422	1,546,633	1,468,789	1,101/km^{2} (2,850/sq mi)	952
Rural	5,195.11 km^{2} (2,005.84 sq mi)	2,757,002	1,414,097	1,342,905	988/km^{2} (2,560/sq mi)	949
Urban	128.89 km^{2} (49.76 sq mi)	258,420	132,536	125,884	5,682 km^{2} (2,194 sq mi)	

=== Religion ===
Religion in Murshidabad district (2011)
Religion	Percent
Islam	66.27%
Hinduism	33.21%
Other or not stated	0.52%

Religion in Murshidabad district
Religion	1941		1951		1961		1971		2001		2011	
Religion	Pop.	%	Pop.	%	Pop.	%	Pop.	%	Pop.	%	Pop.	%
Islam	927,747	56.55%	947,815	55.24%	1,279,256	55.86%	1,656,406	56.33%	3,735,380	63.67%	4,707,573	66.27%
Hinduism	684,987	41.75%	765,218	44.60%	1,009,470	44.08%	1,277,873	43.46%	2,107,469	35.92%	2,359,061	33.21%
Tribal religion	26,138	1.59%	441	0.03%	—N/a	—N/a	—N/a	—N/a	—N/a	—N/a	—N/a	—N/a
Others (Note: Including Jainism, Christianity, Buddhism, Zoroastrianism, Judaism, Ad-Dharmis, or not stated)	1,658	0.10%	2,285	0.13%	1,284	0.06%	5,925	0.21%	23,720	0.41%	37,173	0.52%
Total Population	1,640,530	100%	1,715,759	100%	2,290,010	100%	2,940,204	100%	5,866,569	100%	7,103,807	100%

The majority of people of the district, around 66.27%, are Muslims, who dominate rural areas. Muslims are most concentrated on the banks of the Padma along the Bangladesh border. Hindus form 33.21% of the population, and form a majority in urban areas.

CD Block	Muslim %	Hindu %	Others %
Farakka	67.15	32.23	0.62
Samserganj	83.48	16.38	0.14
Suti I	58.15	41.62	0.23
Suti II	72.53	27.22	0.25
Raghunathganj I	56.48	43.32	0.2
Raghunathganj II	81.97	17.87	0.16
Lalgola	80.25	19.50	0.25
Sagardighi	64.68	31.56	3.76
Bhagawangola I	85.67	14.19	0.14
Bhagawangola II	89.43	10.48	0.09
Jalangi	73.27	26.57	0.16
Domkal	89.69	10.16	0.15
Raninagar I	81.69	18.20	0.11
Raninagar II	80.78	19.03	0.19
Murshidabad Jiaganj	54.52	44.61	0.87
Nabagram	52.59	45.17	2.24
Khargram	54.22	45.53	0.25
Kandi	60.65	38.82	0.53
Berhampore	53.63	45.94	0.43
Hariharpara	80.70	19.04	0.26
Nawda	71.87	27.99	0.14
Beldanga I	78.25	21.4	0.35
Beldanga II	61.82	38.05	0.13
Bharatpur I	57.45	42.39	0.16
Bharatpur II	57.71	42.16	0.13
Burwan	43.06	56.76	0.18
Area not under any sub-district	33.98	65.24	0.78

=== Language ===
Bengali is the predominant language, spoken by 98.49% of the population. The most spoken Bengali dialect in the district is called Rarhi Bengali, which is more or less the same as spoken in other parts of South Bengal, with some occasional local accents. A regional dialect of Bengali language, Varendri Bengali (also known as Jangipuri or Maldaiya Bengali) is prevalent among the population of Jangipur subdivision of the district. Moreover, a variant of Hindi-Urdu language influenced by Bengali, Khotta Bhasha is also spoken by a substantial amount of population in the northern regions (specially Farakka, Samserganj, Suti, Jangipur areas) of the district. Adivasi languages spoken in the district include Santali and Malto.

== Culture ==
=== Tourism ===
The district, especially Murshidabad town is very important in Bengal's history. The place draws a good number of tourists every year.

==== The Hazarduari Palace ====
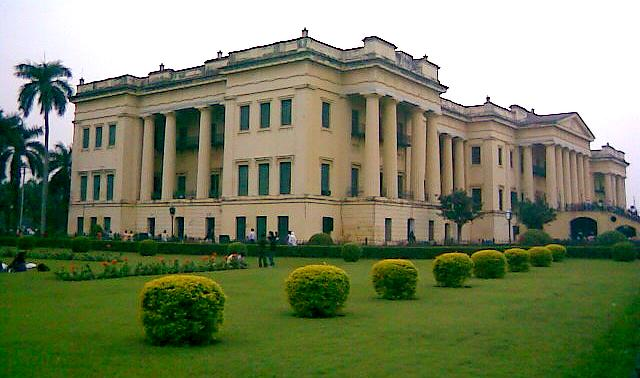
Hazarduari Palace

The Hazarduari Palace, or the palace with a thousand doors is the chief tourist attraction of Murshidabad. This three-storey palace was built in 1837 by Duncan McLeod for the Nawab Najim Humaun Jah, descendant of Mir Zafar. It has thousand doors (among which only 100 are real) and 114 rooms and 8 galleries, built in European architectural style. The total area of Hazarduari Palace is 41 acres (17 ha). It is now a museum and has a collection of armoury, splendid paintings, exhaustive portraits of the Nawabs, various works of art including works of ivory (Murshidabad school) of China (European) and many other valuables. The Armoury has 2700 arms in its collections of which only few are displayed. Swords used by Shiraj-ud-Daulla and his grandfather, Nawab Alivardi Khan, can be seen here. The other attractions in this floor are Vintage Cars and Fittan Cars used by the Nawabs and their families.

==== Wasef Manzil and other buildings and sites ====
Around the palace are other attractions like the Wasef Manzil (the New Palace) by the bank of the Ganges, Tripolia Gate, the Dakshin Darwaza, the Chak Darwaza, the Imambara, the Gharighar (the Clock Tower), the Bachchawali Tope (a canon) and the Madina, the only surviving structure built by Siraj-ud-Doula. The Bachchawali Tope (canon) was made between the 12th and the 14th century, probably by the Muslim rulers of Gaur.

==== Royal library ====
The library containing rare collections is not accessible to the public unless special permission is obtained. The building, rectangular on plan (424 feet Long and 200 feet (61 m) broad and 80 feet (24 m) high). The Palace was used for holding the "Durbar" or meetings and other official work of the Nawabs and also as the residence of the high ranking British Officials.

=== Festivals ===
Most Famous Fastival of Murshidabad is Beldanga Kartik puja which held in 16/17 and 17/18 November. Durga Puja, a five-day-long puja is the most important festival of the Hindus. Other pujas like Diwali, Kali puja, and Saraswati Puja are also celebrated here. Eid-ul-Fitr and Eid-ul-Adha (Bakri-eid, locally), Ashura are prominent Muslim festivities in this district.

== Places of interest ==
=== Historical places ===
- Hazarduari Palace
- Katra Masjid
- Nizamat Imambara
- Motijheel Park
- Kathgola Palace
- Fauti Masjid
- Jahan Kosha Cannon

=== Jamindarbari and Rajbari ===
- Nimtita Jamindarbari
- Jagtai Choudhury Bari
- Dhuliyan Jamindarbari
- Lalgola Rajbari
- Kandi Rajbari
- Nashipur Rajbari
- Kashimbazar Rajbari

=== Others ===
- Beldanga
- Karnasubarna
- Panchthupi

== Educational institutes ==
Notable education institutions in Murshidabad include:

=== Schools ===
- Krishnath College School
- Raghunathganj High School
- Sargachi Ramakrishna Mission High School
- Srikantabati P.S.S. Sikshaniketan

=== Colleges ===
- Berhampore College
- Berhampore Girls' College
- Dukhulal Nibaran Chandra College
- Dumkal College
- G. D. College, Shaikhpara
- Jalangi Mahavidyalaya
- Jangipur College
- Jatindra Rajendra Mahavidyalaya
- Kandi Raj College
- Krishnath College
- Lalgola College
- Muzaffar Ahmed Mahavidyalaya
- Nur Mohammad Smriti Mahavidyalaya
- Panchthupi Haripada Gouribala College
- Prof. Sayed Nurul Hasan College
- Rani Dhanyakumari College
- Sagardighi Kamada Kinkar Smriti Mahavidyalaya
- Sripat Singh College

=== Engineering colleges ===
- Dumkal Institute of Engineering & Technology
- Government College of Engineering & Textile Technology, Berhampore
- Jangipur Government Polytechnic
- Murshidabad College of Engineering & Technology
- Murshidabad Institute of Technology

=== Medical colleges ===
- Murshidabad Medical College and Hospital

=== Law colleges ===
- Mohammad Abdul Bari Institute of Juridical Science

=== Universities ===
- Aligarh Muslim University, Murshidabad Centre
- Murshidabad University

== Notable people ==
=== Politics ===
- Abdus Sattar
- Nur-e-Alam Siddique
- Khalilur Rahaman
- Adhir Ranjan Chowdhury
- Tridib Chaudhuri
- Sudip Bandyopadhyay
- Subrata Saha

=== Literature ===
- Babar Ali
- Sarat Chandra Pandit (AKA Dada Thakur)
- Nirupama Devi
- Moniruddin Khan
- Mahasweta Devi
- Arup Chandra
- Syed Mustafa Siraj
- Ritwik Ghatak
- Manish Ghatak
- Nabarun Bhattacharya
- Ramendra Sundar Tribedi
- Paban Das Baul
- Krishnabhabini Das
- Gangadhar Sen Roy
- Abul Bashar
- Byomkes Chakrabarti

=== History, science and culture ===
- Abdul Alim
- Abul Hayat
- Ajit Pandey
- Arijit Singh
- Baby Islam
- Bidhayak Bhattacharya
- Bikash Sinha
- Braja Bhusan Gupta
- Farida Yasmin (singer)
- Mir Afsar Ali
- R. D. Banerji
- Radha Kumud Mukherjee
- Radhakamal Mukerjee
- Ram Brahma Sanyal
- Sharmili Ahmed
- Shreya Ghoshal
- Subhasis Chaudhuri
- Syed Mustafa Siraj
