= Sagardighi Assembly constituency =

State-level election constituency in West Bengal, India

Sagardighi
- Constituency No. 60 for the West Bengal Legislative Assembly
- Interactive Map Outlining Sagardighi Assembly Constituency

Constituency details
- Country: India
- Region: East India
- State: West Bengal
- District: Murshidabad
- Lok Sabha constituency: Jangipur
- Established: 1951
- Total electors: 236,885
- Reservation: None

Member of Legislative Assembly
- 18th West Bengal Legislative Assembly
- Incumbent Bayron Biswas
- Party: DTC
- Elected year: 2026

Sagardighi Assembly constituency is an assembly constituency in Murshidabad district in the Indian state of West Bengal.

== Overview ==
As per orders of the Delimitation Commission, No. 60 Sagardighi Assembly constituency covers Sagardighi community development block.

Sagadighi Assembly constituency is part of No. 9 Jangipur (Lok Sabha constituency).

== Members of the Legislative Assembly ==
Year	Name	Party
1951	Shyamapada Bhattacharya	Indian National Congress
1951	Kuber Chand Halder	Indian National Congress
1957	Shyamapada Bhattacharya	Indian National Congress
1957	Kuber Chand Halder	Indian National Congress
1962	Ambika Chanran Das	Indian National Congress
1967	Ambika Chanran Das	Indian National Congress
1969	Kuber Chand Halder	Bangla Congress
1971	Atul Chandra Sarkar	Indian National Congress
1972	Nrisinha Kumar Mandal	Indian National Congress
1977	Hazari Biswas	Communist Party of India (Marxist)
1982	Hazari Biswas	Communist Party of India (Marxist)
1987	Paresh Nath Das	Communist Party of India (Marxist)
1991	Paresh Nath Das	Communist Party of India (Marxist)
1996	Paresh Nath Das	Communist Party of India (Marxist)
2001	Paresh Nath Das	Communist Party of India (Marxist)
2006	Parikhit Let	Communist Party of India (Marxist)
2011	Subrata Saha	Trinamool Congress
2016	Subrata Saha	Trinamool Congress
2021	Subrata Saha	Trinamool Congress
2023^	Bayron Biswas	Indian National Congress
2026	Bayron Biswas	Trinamool Congress

^ denotes by-election.

== Election results ==
=== 2026 ===
Detailed Results at: https://results.eci.gov.in/ResultAcGenMay2026/candidateswise-S2560.htm

2026 West Bengal Legislative Assembly election: Sagardighi
Party	Candidate	Votes	%	±%
AITC	Bayron Biswas	90,781	43.72	▲8.74
BJP	Tapas Kumar Chakraborty	56,521	27.22	▲13.28
SDPI	Masiur Rahaman	42,495	20.46	
INC	Manoj Chakraborty	10,348	4.98	▼42.37
NOTA	None of the above	1,938	0.93	▲0.02
Majority		34,260	16.5	▼10.37
Turnout		207,660	95.58	▲16.72
AITC gain from INC		Swing		

=== 2023 bypoll ===
By-poll was necessitated due to the death of sitting MLA Subrata Saha of Trinamool Congress. Shortly after the election, the winning INC candidate Bayron Biswas defected to Trinamool Congress.

2023 West Bengal Legislative Assembly by-election: Sagardighi
Party	Candidate	Votes	%	±%
INC	Bayron Biswas	87,667	47.35	+27.90
AITC	Debasish Bandopadhyay	64,681	34.94	−16.01
BJP	Dilip Saha	25,815	13.94	−10.14
NOTA	None of the above	1,337	0.72	−0.19
Majority		22,986		
Turnout		1,85,142	73.49	
INC gain from AITC		Swing		

=== 2021 ===
2021 West Bengal assembly Elections: Sagardighi
Party	Candidate	Votes	%	±%
AITC	Subrata Saha	95,189	50.95	
BJP	Mafuja Khatun	44,983	24.08	
INC	Sk M. Hasanuzzaman	36,344	19.45	
AIMIM	Nur Mehboob Alam	3,450	1.85	
NOTA	None of the above	1,705	0.91	
Majority		50,206	26.87	
Turnout		186,816	78.86	
AITC hold		Swing		

=== 2016 ===
In the 2016 election, Subrata Saha of Trinamool Congress defeated his nearest rival, Aminul Islam of Congress.

West Bengal assembly elections, 2016: Sagardighi constituency
Party	Candidate	Votes	%	±%
AITC	Subrata Saha	44,817	26.23	−11.79
INC	Aminul Islam	39,603	23.18	
CPI(M)	Rajab Ali Mallick	39,385	23.05	−11.80
Independent	Samsul Hoda	31,920	18.68	
BJP	Debsharan Ghosh	7,358	4.31	+1.38
SDPI	Badrul Sekh	2,725	1.59	−2.72
NOTA	None of the above	1,969	1.15	
Independent	Kanika Chakroborty (Das)	1,672	0.98	
SUCI(C)	Mirza Lutful Hoque	1,416	0.83	
Turnout		170,865	82.92	−2.67
AITC hold		Swing		

Samsul Hoda, contesting as an Independent candidate, was a rebel Trinamool Congress candidate.

=== 2011 ===
In the 2011 election, Subrata Saha of Trinamool Congress defeated his nearest rival Ismail Sekh of CPI(M).

West Bengal assembly elections, 2011: Sagardighi constituency
Party	Candidate	Votes	%	±%
AITC	Subrata Saha	54,708	38.02	−8.01#
CPI(M)	Ismail Sekh	50,134	34.85	−13.77
Independent	Aminul Islam	22,402	15.57	
SDPI	Badrul Sekh	6,198	4.31	
BJP	Shekharendu Das	4,220	2.93	
Independent	Daud Mondal	2,934		
Independent	Naru Gopal Saha	2,037		
BSP	Dhananjoy Bandopadhyay	1,243		
Turnout		143,876	85.59	
AITC gain from CPI(M)		Swing	+5.56#	

Aminul Islam, a rebel Congress candidate contesting as an independent, was suspended from the party, but Adhir Chowdhury, the Baharampur MP continued to extend support to him.

.# Swing calculated on Congress+Trinamool Congress vote percentages taken together in 2006.

=== 2006 ===
In the 2006 state assembly elections, Parikshit Let of CPI(M) won the Sagardighi (SC) assembly seat defeating Rajesh Kumar Bhakat of Congress. Contests in most years were multi cornered but only winners and runners are being mentioned. Paresh Nath Das of CPI(M) defeated Rajesh Kumar Bhakat representing Trinamool Congress in 2001, Nrisinha Kumar Mandal of Congress in 1996, 1991 and 1987. Hazari Biswas of CPI(M) defeated Nrisinha Kumar Mandal of Congress in 1982 and Atul Chandra Sarkar of Congress in 1977.

=== 1972 ===
Nrisinha Kumar Mandal of Congress won in 1972. Atul Chandra Sarkar of Congress won in 1971. Kuber Chand Haldar of Bangla Congress won in 1969. Ambika Charan Das of Congress won in 1967 and 1962. In 1957 Sagadigighi constituency was not there. Jangipur was a joint seat in 1957. It was won by Shyama Pada Bhattacharjee and Kuber Chand Haldar both of Congress. In independent India's first election in 1951 Sagardighi was a joint seat. It was won by Shyama Pada Bhattacharjee and Kuber Chand Haldar both of Congress.
