= Atish Chandra Sinha =

Indian politician (1940–2010)

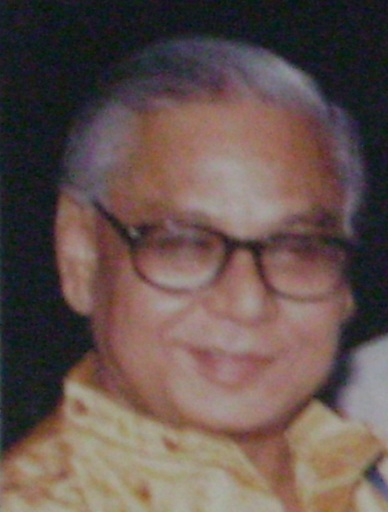

Member of West Bengal Legislative Assembly
- In office 1971-1987, 1991-2006
- Preceded by: Kumar Jagadish Chandra Sinha
- Succeeded by: Syed Wahid Reza, Apurba Sarkar
- Constituency: Kandi

Member of Parliament, Lok Sabha
- In office 1984-1989
- Preceded by: Tridib Chaudhuri
- Succeeded by: Nani Bhattacharya
- Constituency: Baharampur

Minister for Small Scale and Cottage Industry
- In office 1972-1977
- Constituency: Kandi

Personal details
- Born: 11 July 1940 Calcutta, Bengal Presidency, British India
- Died: 4 March 2010 (aged 69) Kolkata, West Bengal, India
- Party: Indian National Congress (1964-2006); Trinamool Congress (2006-2010)
- Spouse: Archana Sinha
- Children: Anindita Sinha, Aninda Sinha

Atish Chandra Sinha (11 July 1940 – 4 March 2010) was a minister and Leader of the Opposition in the Indian state of West Bengal. Physicist Bikash Sinha is his cousin.

== Early life ==
The son of Bimal Chandra Sinha, scion of the Kandi Raj family and a minister in the Bidhan Chandra Roy cabinet, Atish Chandra Sinha was born in the Kandi Raj family on 11 July 1940. A brilliant scholar of Presidency College, Kolkata, he specialized in Geophysics from the Imperial College in London.

== In politics ==
He joined politics in the 1960s. He was elected to the state assembly as a Congress candidate from Kandi in 1971, 1972, 1977, 1982, 1991, 1996 and 2001. He was elected to the Indian Parliament from Baharampur (Lok Sabha constituency) in 1984.

He was minister of small scale and cottage industries from 1972 to 1977. He was Leader of the Opposition in the West Bengal Legislative Assembly from 1996 to 2001 and was leader of the Congress legislative party in the West Bengal assembly from 2001 to 2006. As a result of differences with Adhir Ranjan Chowdhury within the Congress Party, he joined Trinamool Congress in 2006.

From 2002 onwards, he was ill off and on but did not give up active politics. He was involved in many social activities. He established the Bimal Chandra College of Law in Kandi in the memory of his father, Bimal Sinha. He died at his Kolkata residence on 4 March 2010.

== Other activities ==
He was an active member of Calcutta South Club, whose obituary says of him "A member of the Royal family of Kandi in West Bengal, he was a very active politician of the Congress party. He was a cabinet minister in the Government of West Bengal when Shri Siddhart Shankar Ray was the Chief Minister, Member of Parliament and leader of opposition in the State Assembly of West Bengal. ...He has been an Executive Committee Member and Vice President of the club for several years. He had been on the Davis Cup Working Committees of the club."
