= Baharampur Lok Sabha constituency =

Lok Sabha Constituency in West Bengal, India

Coordinates: 24°06′N 88°15′E

Baharampur WB-10
- Lok Sabha constituency
- Interactive Map Outlining Berhampore Lok Sabha Constituency

Constituency details
- Country: India
- Region: East India
- State: West Bengal
- Assembly constituencies: Burwan; Kandi; Bharatpur; Rejinagar; Beldanga; Baharampur; Naoda
- Established: 1951
- Total electors: 1,453,783
- Reservation: None

Member of Parliament
- 18th Lok Sabha
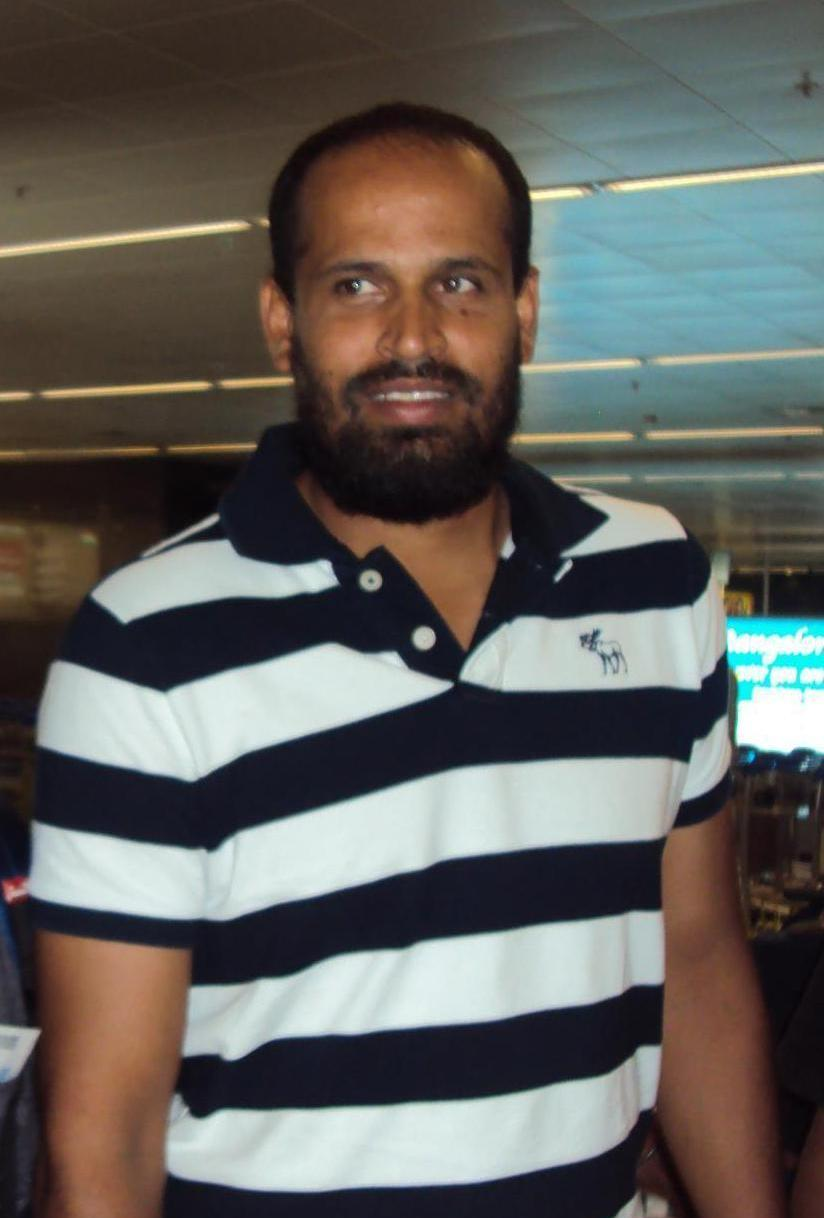
- Incumbent Yusuf Pathan
- Party: NCPI
- Alliance: NDA
- Elected year: 2024

Baharampur Lok Sabha constituency (earlier known as Berhampore) is one of the 543 parliamentary constituencies in India. The constituency centres on Baharampur in West Bengal. All the seven assembly segments of No. 10 Baharampur Lok Sabha constituency are in Murshidabad district.

Most Successful parties from Baharampur Lok Sabha
1. Revolutionary Socialist Party (11times) (61.1%)
2. Indian National Congress (6 times) (33.3%)
3. Trinamool Congress (1 time) (5.55%)

== Assembly segments ==
Parliamentary constituencies in West Bengal - 1. Cooch Behar, 2. Alipurduars, 3. Jalpaiguri, 4. Darjeeling, 5. Raiganj, 6. Balurghat, 7. Maldaha Uttar, 8. Maldaha Dakshin, 9. Jangipur, 10. Baharampur, 11. Murshidabad, 12. Krishnanagar, 13. Ranaghat, 14. Bangaon, 15. Barrackpore, 16. Dum Dum, 17. Barasat, 18. Basirhat, 19. Jaynagar, 20. Mathurapur, 21. Diamond Harbour, 22. Jadavpur, 23. Kolkata Dakshin, 24. Kolkata Uttar, 25. Howrah, 26. Uluberia, 27. Serampore, 28. Hooghly, 29. Arambagh, 30. Tamluk, 31, Kanthi, 32. Ghatal, 33. Jhargram, 34. Medinipur, 35. Purulia, 36. Bankura, 37. Bishnupur, 38. Bardhaman Purba, 39. Bardhaman Durgapur, 40. Asansol, 41. Bolpur, 42. Birbhum

As per order of the Delimitation Commission in respect of the delimitation of constituencies in West Bengal, parliamentary constituency no. 10 Baharampur is composed of the following assembly segments from 2009:

#	Name	District	Member	Party	2024 Lead
67	Burwan (SC)	Murshidabad	Sukhen Kumar Bagdi	BJP	BJP
68	Kandi	Murshidabad	Gargi Das Ghosh	BJP	AITC
69	Bharatpur	Murshidabad	Mustafizur Rahaman	AITC	AITC
70	Rejinagar	Murshidabad	Shankharav Sarkar	BJP	AITC
71	Beldanga	Murshidabad	Bharat Kumar Jhawar	BJP	AITC
72	Baharampur	Murshidabad	Subrata Maitra	BJP	INC
74	Naoda	Murshidabad	Humayun Kabir	AJUP	AITC

In 2004 Berhampore Lok Sabha constituency was composed of the following assembly segments:Naoda (assembly constituency no. 61), Berhampore (assembly constituency no. 63), Beldanga (assembly constituency no. 64), Kandi (assembly constituency no. 65), Barwan (assembly constituency no. 67), Bharatpur (assembly constituency no. 68), Ketugram (SC) (assembly constituency no. 282)

== Members of Parliament ==
Year	Name	Party
1952	Tridib Chaudhuri	Revolutionary Socialist Party
1957	Tridib Chaudhuri	Revolutionary Socialist Party
1962	Tridib Chaudhuri	Revolutionary Socialist Party
1967	Tridib Chaudhuri	Revolutionary Socialist Party
1971	Tridib Chaudhuri	Revolutionary Socialist Party
1977	Tridib Chaudhuri	Revolutionary Socialist Party
1980	Tridib Chaudhuri	Revolutionary Socialist Party
1984	Atish Chandra Sinha	Indian National Congress
1989	Nani Bhattacharya	Revolutionary Socialist Party
1991	Nani Bhattacharya	Revolutionary Socialist Party
1996	Pramothes Mukherjee	Revolutionary Socialist Party
1998	Pramothes Mukherjee	Revolutionary Socialist Party
1999	Adhir Ranjan Chowdhury	Indian National Congress
2004	Adhir Ranjan Chowdhury	Indian National Congress
2009	Adhir Ranjan Chowdhury	Indian National Congress
2014	Adhir Ranjan Chowdhury	Indian National Congress
2019	Adhir Ranjan Chowdhury	Indian National Congress
2024	Yusuf Pathan	All India Trinamool Congress
2026 (Note: Switched to NCPI as part of AITC Rebels in Lok Sabha.)	Yusuf Pathan	Nationalist Citizens Party of India

== Election results ==
Vote share of Winning candidates
2024	37.88%
2019	45.47%
2014	50.54%
2009	56.91%
2004	51.50%
1999	46.86%
1998	44.46%
1996	48.53%
1994 (By-Poll)	52.39%
1991	43.57%
1989	48.26%
1984	48.58%
1980	57.43%
1977	53.81%
1971	25.42%
1967	49.36%
1962	54.73%
1957	50.72%
1952	46.17%

=== 2024 ===
2024 Indian general election: Baharampur
Party	Candidate	Votes	%	±%
AITC	Yusuf Pathan (Note: Defected to NCPI)	524,516	37.88	▼1.38
INC	Adhir Ranjan Chowdhury	439,494	31.74	▼13.73
BJP	Dr. Nirmal Kumar Saha	371,886	26.86	▲15.86
NOTA	None of the above	7,485	0.54	▼0.54
Majority		85,022	6.14	▼0.07
Turnout		1,384,770	77.54	▼1.87
AITC gain from INC		Swing		

=== 2019 ===
2019 Indian general elections: Baharampur
Party	Candidate	Votes	%	±%
INC	Adhir Ranjan Chowdhury	591,147	45.47	−5.07
AITC	Apurba Sarkar (David)	510,410	39.26	+19.61
BJP	Krishna Joyardar	143,038	11.00	+3.93
NOTA	None of the above	14,086	1.08	
Majority		80,696	6.21	−24.64
Turnout		1,301,033	79.41	+0.02
Registered electors		1,638,378		
INC hold		Swing	-4.50	

=== 2014 ===
2014 Indian general elections: Baharampur
Party	Candidate	Votes	%	±%
INC	Adhir Ranjan Chowdhury	583,549	50.54	−6.37
AITC	Indranil Sen	226,982	19.69	N/A
RSP	Pramothes Mukherjee	225,699	19.54	−17.73
BJP	Debesh Kumar Adhikary	81,656	7.07	+5.07
SDPI	Badrul Sekh	11,642	1.00	
Jamat-e-Seratul Mustakim	Md. Ezaruddin	4,869	4.21	
BSP	Kushadhwaj Bala	4,676	0.40	
IUML	Abdus Sukur	4,322	0.34	
Majority		356,567	30.85	+11.22
Turnout		11,54,587	79.42	−1.28
INC hold		Swing	-6.37	

=== 2009 ===
General Election, 2009: Baharampur
Party	Candidate	Votes	%	±%
INC	Adhir Ranjan Chowdhury	541,920	56.91	+5.41
RSP	Pramothes Mukherjee	354,943	37.27	−4.13
BJP	Bidyut Kumar Halder	27,619	2.00	
Independent	Baidya Nath Mondal	9,195	0.96	
BSP	Kushadhwaj Bala	8,587	0.90	
RPI(A)	Ghosh Babu Saw	3,823	0.40	
SP	Ashoke Kumar Singha	3,076	0.32	
RDMP	Rabindra Nath Roy	3,050	0.32	
Majority		186,977	19.64	+9.64
Turnout		9,52,213	80.70	
INC hold		Swing		

=== 2004 ===
General Election, 2004: Baharampur
Party	Candidate	Votes	%	±%
INC	Adhir Ranjan Chowdhury	508,095	51.50	
RSP	Pramothes Mukherjee	409,194	41.40	
BJP	Tapas Kumar Chatterjee	41,490	4.20	
Independent	Jyotirmoy Thakur	9,672	1.00	
JDP	Apurba Banerjee	6,818	0.70	
Independent	Sunil Kumar Mandal	5,643	0.60	
RPI(A)	Ashim Roy	3,798	0.40	
Independent	Krishna Prasad Biswas	3,428	0.30	
Samajwadi Party	Ashok Kumar Singha	3,377	0.30	
Majority		98,901	10.0	−0.20
Turnout		9,87,380	80.9%	
INC hold		Swing		

=== 1999 ===
1999 Indian general election: Behrampore
Party	Candidate	Votes	%	±%
INC	Adhir Ranjan Chowdhury	434,073	46.86	
RSP	Pramothes Mukherjee	338,683	36.56	
BJP	Retd.Colonel Sabyasachi Bagchi	134,569	14.53	
Independent	Jyotirmoy Thakur	8,948	0.97	
IUML	Nurul Islam	3,618	0.39	
Independent	Siddhartha Chatterjee	2,679	0.29	
BSP	Sunil Kumar Mandal	1,066	0.12	
Independent	Kanan Kumar Saha	911	0.10	
Independent	Sadhan Roy	881	0.10	
Independent	Santosh Majhi	745	0.08	
Independent	Anarul Haque Malitha	203	0.02	
Majority		95,391	10.20 %	
Turnout		9,26,375	77.33	
INC gain from RSP		Swing		

=== 1998 ===
1998 Indian general election: Behrampore
Party	Candidate	Votes	%	±%
RSP	Pramothes Mukherjee	385,979	44.46	
BJP	Retd.Colonel Sabyasachi Bagchi	262,610	30.25	
INC	Prodip Mazumdar	188,985	21.77	
MUL	Abdus Sukur	29,888	3.44	
Independent	Kanan Kumar Saha	784	0.09	
Majority		123,369	14.00 %	
Turnout		9,26,375	77.33	
RSP hold		Swing		

=== 1996 ===
1996 Indian general election: Behrampore
Party	Candidate	Votes	%	±%
RSP	Pramothes Mukherjee	449,656	48.53	
INC	Siddhartha Shankar Ray	405,299	43.75	
BJP	Subhendu Biswas	56,073	6.05	
Independent	Naimul Haque	2,886	0.97	
Majority		44,357		
Turnout		9,26,375	77.33	
RSP hold		Swing		

==== 1994 By-election ====
In the Behrampore seat, the by-election was held due to the death of the sitting RSP-MP Nani Bhattacharya on 11 October 1993. The by-election was held on 12 March 1994. Pramothes Mukherjee of RSP defeated Siddhartha Shankar Ray of Congress.

Indian Parliamentary bye election, 1994: Behrampore constituency
Party	Candidate	Votes	%	±%
RSP	Pramothes Mukherjee	387,549	52.39	
INC	Siddhartha Shankar Ray	292,262	39.84	
BJP	Mohasin Ali Mondal	128,570	19.85	
IUML	Abdul Hossain Sekh	93,912	12.93	
Independent	Arup Chakraborty	12,719	1.89	
Majority		95,287	8.70	
Turnout		96,650	47.69	−6.7
RSP hold		Swing	+21.27	

=== 1991 ===
1991 Indian general election: Berhampore
Party	Candidate	Votes	%	±%
RSP	Nani Bhatacharyya	345,678	43.57	
INC	Kumar Dipti Sengupta	266,469	33.59	
BJP	Pranab Kumar Banerjee	160,467	20.23	
IND	Haji Idrish Hossain	5,664	0.71	
IND	Kunal Biswas	3,927	0.49	
JP	Anisur Rahman Khuda Bukhsh	3,870	0.49	
BSP	Srikanta Kotal	2,614	0.33	
IND	Sreemohan Thakur	2,613	0.33	
AIMIM	Mohammad Ali Jinnah	2,077	0.26	
Majority		79,209	9.98	
Turnout		812,803	76.02	
RSP hold		Swing		

=== 1989 ===
1989 Indian general election: Berhampore
Party	Candidate	Votes	%	±%
RSP	Mani Bhattacharya	376,064	48.26	
INC	Sankar Das Paul	313,268	40.20	
BJP	Pranab Kumar Bandyopadhayay	58,801	7.55	
IND	Shaikh Abdul Bari	22,650	2.91	
IUML	Mokaddim Shaikh	4,445	0.57	
IND	Roy Amiya Kumar	1,615	0.21	
IND	S. K. Golam Mahabu	1,453	0.19	
AMB	Chittaranjan Sarkar	883	0.11	
Majority		62,796	8.06	
Turnout		791,398	75.69	
Swing to RSP from INC		Swing		

=== 1984 ===
1984 Indian general election: Berhampore
Party	Candidate	Votes	%	±%
INC	Atish Chandra Sinha	317,011	48.58	
RSP	Tridib Chaudhuri	313,964	48.11	
BJP	Pranav Kumar Banerjee	14,452	2.21	
IUML	Abdul Baten Jalal Ahmed	2,897	0.44	
LKD	Mokaddim Shaikh	2,785	0.43	
IND	Chittaranjan Sarkar	1,507	0.23	
Majority		3,047	0.47	
Turnout		663,678	76.53	
Swing to INC from RSP		Swing		

=== 1980 ===
1980 Indian general election: Berhampore
Party	Candidate	Votes	%	±%
RSP	Tridib Chaudhari	307,328	57.43	
INC(I)	Jagadish Sinha	215,059	40.19	
INC(U)	Azizur Rahman	12,732	2.38	
Majority		92,269	17.24	
Turnout		545,770	70.07	
RSP hold		Swing		

=== 1977 ===
1977 Indian general election: Berhampore
Party	Candidate	Votes	%	±%
RSP	Tridip Chaudhuri	204,809	53.81	
INC	Sudip Bandyopadhyay	102,629	26.97	
IND	Anisur Rahaman Khuda Bakhsh	63,104	16.58	
IND	Mahasin Ali	5,706	1.50	
IND	Abdul Halim	4,339	1.14	
Majority		102,180	26.84	
Turnout		391,275	60.66	
RSP hold		Swing		

=== 1971 ===
1971 Indian general election: Berhampore
Party	Candidate	Votes	%	±%
RSP	Tridib Choudhuri	75,316	25.42	
INC	Karim Rezaul	64,559	21.79	
IND	Khondkar Nazrul Haque	58,262	19.67	
CPI(M)	Santosh Kumar Bhattacharyya	45,177	15.25	
IND	Muhammed Khuda Bukhsh	30,752	10.38	
ABJS	Ajit Kumar Moitra	22,179	7.49	
Majority		10,757	3.63	
Turnout		312,302	57.96	
Swing to RSP from Independent		Swing		

=== 1967 ===
1967 Indian general election: Berhampore
Party	Candidate	Votes	%	±%
IND	T. Chaudhuri	155,789	49.36	
INC	D. Sinha	147,161	46.63	
IND	C. B. A. A. Fazal	6,702	2.12	
IND	A. A. Hossain	5,939	1.88	
Majority		8,628	2.73	
Turnout		329,355	63.58	
Swing to Independent from RSP		Swing		

=== 1962 ===
1962 Indian general election: Berhampur
Party	Candidate	Votes	%	±%
RSP	Tridib Kumar Chaudhuri	159,119	54.73	
INC	Khondekar Nazrul Haque	131,630	45.27	
Majority		27,489	9.46	
Turnout		300,297	56.32	
Swing to RSP from Independent		Swing		

=== 1957 ===
1957 Indian general election: Berhampore
Party	Candidate	Votes	%	±%
IND	Tridib Chowdhuri	133,477	50.72	
IND	Nazrul Haque Khandoker	118,995	45.22	
IND	Birendra Kumar Majumdar	10,689	4.06	
Majority		14,482	5.50	
Turnout		263,161	57.37	
Swing to Independent from RSP		Swing		

=== 1952 ===
1951–52 Indian general election: Berhampore
Party	Candidate	Votes	%	±%
RSP	Tridib Chaudhuri	82,579	46.17	
IND	A. K. M. Zakariah	54,186	30.29	
INC	Nalinaksha Sanyal	23,273	13.01	
IND	Jagadish Chandra Sinha	8,530	4.77	
IND	Patitpaban Misra	5,436	3.04	
IND	Ashutosh Bhattacheryya	4,869	2.72	
Majority		28,393	15.88	
Turnout		178,873	48.13	
RSP win (new seat)				

== See also ==
- Baharampur, also known as Berhampore
- List of constituencies of the Lok Sabha
