= Nabagram Assembly constituency =

Nabagram
- Constituency No. 65 for the West Bengal Legislative Assembly
- Interactive Map Outlining Nabagram Assembly Constituency

Constituency details
- Country: India
- Region: East India
- State: West Bengal
- District: Murshidabad
- Lok Sabha constituency: Jangipur
- Established: 1967
- Total electors: 251,378
- Reservation: SC

Member of Legislative Assembly
- 18th West Bengal Legislative Assembly
- Incumbent Dilip Saha
- Party: BJP
- Alliance: NDA
- Elected year: 2026

Nabagram Assembly constituency is an assembly constituency in Murshidabad district in the Indian state of West Bengal. It is reserved for scheduled castes.

== Overview ==
As per orders of the Delimitation Commission, No. 65 Nabagram Assembly constituency (SC) covers Nabagram community development block, and Niyallishpara Goaljan, Radharghat I, Radharghat II and Sahajadpur gram panchayats of Berhampore community development block.

Nabagram Assembly constituency is part of No. 9 Jangipur Lok Sabha constituency.

== Members of the Legislative Assembly ==
Year	Member	Party
1967	A. K. Bakshi	Indian National Congress
1969	Birendra Narayan Roy	Independent politician
1971	Birendra Narayan Roy	Independent politician
1972	Aditya Charan Dutta	Indian National Congress
1977	Birendra Narayan Ray	Communist Party of India (Marxist)
1982	Birendra Narayan Ray	Communist Party of India (Marxist)
1987	Birendra Narayan Ray	Communist Party of India (Marxist)
1991	Sisir Kumar Sarkar	Communist Party of India (Marxist)
1996	Adhir Ranjan Chowdhury	Indian National Congress
2000^	Nripen Chaudhuri	Communist Party of India (Marxist)
2001	Nripen Chaudhuri	Communist Party of India (Marxist)
2006	Mukul Mondal	Communist Party of India (Marxist)
2011	Kanai Chandra Mondal	Communist Party of India (Marxist)
2016	Kanai Chandra Mondal	Communist Party of India (Marxist)
2021	Kanai Chandra Mondal	Trinamool Congress
2026	Dilip Saha	Bharatiya Janata Party

- ^ denotes by-election

== Election results ==
=== 2026 ===
2026 West Bengal Legislative Assembly election: Nabagram
Party	Candidate	Votes	%	±%
BJP	Dilip Saha	78,739	35.54	▲4.4
AITC	Pronab Chandra Das	72,820	32.86	▼15.32
INC	Hiru Haldar	50,144	22.63	
CPI(M)	Purnima Das	13,057	5.89	▼12.88
AJUP	Golak Mandal	2,838	1.28	
NOTA	None of the above	1,883	0.85	▼0.41
Majority		5,919	2.68	▼14.36
Turnout		221,580	90.98	▲8.03
BJP gain from AITC		Swing		

=== 2021 ===
2021 West Bengal Legislative Assembly election: Nabagram
Party	Candidate	Votes	%	±%
AITC	Kanai Chandra Mondal	100,455	48.18	
BJP	Mohan Haldar	64,922	31.14	
CPI(M)	Kripalini Ghosh	39,129	18.77	
NOTA	None of the above	2,629	1.26	
Majority		35,533	17.04	
Turnout		208,516	82.95	
AITC gain from CPI(M)		Swing		

=== 2016 ===
2016 West Bengal Legislative Assembly election: Nabagram
Party	Candidate	Votes	%	±%
CPI(M)	Kanai Chandra Mondal	99,545	55.80	
AITC	Dilip Saha	61,102	34.20	
BJP	Susanta Marjit	13,084	7.30	
SP	Radha Madhab Mandal	2,372	1.30	
WPOI	Amit Mehena	1,232	0.70	
SUCI(C)	Babun Mandal	1,143	0.60	
Majority		38,443		
Turnout		1,78,478	87.65	
CPI(M) hold		Swing		

=== 2011 ===
2011 West Bengal state assembly election: Nabagram
Party	Candidate	Votes	%	±%
CPI(M)	Kanai Chandra Mondal	78,703	48.98	
INC	Prabal Sarkar	71,147	44.27	
BJP	Dilip Halder	4,489	2.05	
SDPI	Gurupada Das	3,298		
Independent	Anil Mondal	3,057		
Turnout		160,694	87.65	
CPI(M) hold		Swing		

=== 2006 ===
In the 2006 state assembly elections, Mukul Mondal of CPI(M) won the Nabagram assembly seat defeating his nearest rival Rathin Ghosh of Congress. Nripen Chaudhuri of CPI(M) defeated Arit Majumdar of Congress in 2001. Contests in most years were multi cornered but only winners and runners are being mentioned. In the 2000 by-elections, Nripen Chaudhuri of CPI(M) defeated Shyamal Ray of Congress. The by-election was necessitated by the election of sitting MLA, Adhir Ranjan Chowdhury was Elected to Indian Parliament from Baharampur (Lok Sabha constituency).Adhir Ranjan Chowdhury of Congress defeated Muzaffar Hossain of CPI(M) in 1996. Sisir Kumar Sarkar of CPI(M) defeated Adhir Ranjan Chowdhury of Congress in 1991. Birendra Narayan Ray of CPI(M) defeated Pradip Majumdar of Congress in 1987 and 1982, and Durgapada Sinha of Janata Party in 1977. Later Mr. Pradip Majumdar became the Chairman of Berhampore Municipality, West Bengal. He fought the elections and emerged successfully to become the head of Berhampore Municipality.

=== 2001 ===
2001 West Bengal Legislative Assembly election: Nabagram
Party	Candidate	Votes	%	±%
CPI(M)	Nripen Chaudhuri	65,609	49.46%	
INC	Arit Mazumder	57,957	43.69%	
BJP	Abhiram Murmu	5,016	3.78%	
Independent	Nipen Choudhury	1,714	1.29%	
Independent	Sukumar Marjit	1,367	1.03%	
Independent	Shib Sankar Hazra	990	0.75%	
Turnout		132,653	80.86%	
CPI(M) hold		Swing		

=== 2000 bypoll ===
West Bengal state assembly bye election, 2000: Nabagram
Party	Candidate	Votes	%	±%
CPI(M)	Nripen Chaudhuri	62,648	49.72	
INC	Shyamal Ray	54,339	43.13	
AITC	Nirmal Kumar Dutta	8,707	6.91	
Independent	Pranab Ghosh	184	0.14	
Independent	Debasish Sarkar	122	0.10	
Majority		8,309	6.59	
Turnout		1,27,186		
CPI(M) gain from INC		Swing		

=== 1996 ===
2001 West Bengal Legislative Assembly election: Nabagram constituency
Party	Candidate	Votes	%	±%
INC	Adhir Ranjan Chowdhury	76,852	55.84%	
CPI(M)	Muzaffar Hossain	56,523	41.07%	
BJP	Alauddin Shaikh	2,671	1.94%	
Shiv Sena	Anath Bandhu Das	898	0.65%	
BSP	Soumen Das	478	0.35%	
JD(U)	Bankim Chandra Ghosh	208	0.15%	
Majority		20,329		
Turnout		1,37,630	89.71	
INC gain from CPI(M)		Swing		

=== 1972 ===
Aditya Charan Dutta of Congress won in 1972. Birendra Narayan Roy, Independent, won in 1971 and 1969. A.K.Bakshi of Congress won in 1967. The Nabagram seat was not there prior to that.
