= Kandi Assembly constituency =

Kandi
- Constituency No. 68 for the West Bengal Legislative Assembly
- Interactive Map Outlining Kandi Assembly Constituency

Constituency details
- Country: India
- Region: East India
- State: West Bengal
- District: Murshidabad
- Lok Sabha constituency: Baharampur
- Established: 1951
- Total electors: 238,973
- Reservation: None

Member of Legislative Assembly
- 18th West Bengal Legislative Assembly
- Incumbent Gargi Das Ghosh
- Party: BJP
- Alliance: NDA
- Elected year: 2026
- Preceded by: Apurba Sarkar

Kandi Assembly constituency is an assembly constituency in Murshidabad district in the Indian state of West Bengal.

Most Successful Parties from Kandi Assembly
1. Indian National Congress (14 times) (73.7%)
2. Independent politician (2 times) (10.5%)
3. Communist Party of India (1 time) (5.26%)
4. All India Trinamool Congress (1 time) (5.26%)
5. Bharatiya Janata Party (1 time) (5.26%)

== Overview ==
As per orders of the Delimitation Commission, No. 68 Kandi Assembly constituency covers Kandi municipality, Kandi community development block (CDB), and Satui Chaurigachha gram panchayat of Berhampore CDB.

Kandi Assembly constituency is part of No. 10 Baharampur Lok Sabha constituency.

== Members of the Legislative Assembly ==
Year	Name	Party
1951	Goalbadan Trivedi	Indian National Congress
1957	Sudhir Mondal	Indian National Congress
1957	Bimal Chandra Sinha	Indian National Congress
1962	Kumar Jagadish Chandra Sinha	Indian National Congress
1967	G. Trivedi	Indian National Congress
1969	Kumar Jagadish Chandra Sinha	Independent politician
1971	Atish Chandra Sinha	Indian National Congress
1972	Atish Chandra Sinha	Indian National Congress
1977	Atish Chandra Sinha	Indian National Congress
1982	Atish Chandra Sinha	Indian National Congress
1987	Syed Wahid Reza	Communist Party of India
1991	Atish Chandra Sinha	Indian National Congress
1996	Atish Chandra Sinha	Indian National Congress
2001	Atish Chandra Sinha	Indian National Congress
2006	Apurba Sarkar	Independent politician
2011	Apurba Sarkar	Indian National Congress
2016	Apurba Sarkar	Indian National Congress
2019^	Safiul Alam Khan	Indian National Congress
2021	Apurba Sarkar	Trinamool Congress
2026	Gargi Das Ghosh	Bharatiya Janata Party

- ^ denotes by-election

== Election results ==
=== 2026 ===
2026 West Bengal Legislative Assembly election: Kandi
Party	Candidate	Votes	%	±%
BJP	Gargi Das Ghosh	73,355	36.78	▲6.04
AITC	Apurba Sarkar	63,020	31.6	▼19.56
INC	Shamim Rana	31,160	15.62	▲0.84
AIMIM	Mesbahul Islam Khan	22,976	11.52	
NOTA	None of the above	2,932	1.47	▼0.21
Majority		10,335	5.18	▼15.24
Turnout		199,460	85.19	▲7.16
BJP gain from AITC		Swing		

=== 2021 ===
2021 West Bengal Legislative Assembly election: Kandi
Party	Candidate	Votes	%	±%
AITC	Apurba Sarkar	95,399	51.16	▲15.6
BJP	Goutam Roy	57,319	30.74	▲19.4
INC	Shafiul Islam Khan	27,555	14.78	▼33.6
Independent	Syed Azizur Hossain	1,769	0.95	
NOTA	None of the above	3,131	1.68	
Majority		38,080	20.42	
Turnout		186,481	78.03	
AITC gain from INC		Swing		

=== 2019 bypoll ===
2019 West Bengal Legislative Assembly by-election: Kandi
Party	Candidate	Votes	%	±%
INC	Shafiul Alam Khan	79,698	48.38	▼2.84
AITC	Goutam Roy	58,578	35.56	▼2.64
BJP	Sanat Mondal	18,693	11.34	▲5.5
CPI	Debojyoti Roy	5,291	3.21	New entry
NOTA	None of the above	1,799	1.09	▼0.45
Majority		21,120	12.82	▼0.2
Turnout		1,64,710	73.04	▼3.6
INC hold		Swing		

=== 2016 ===
2016 West Bengal Legislative Assembly election: Kandi
Party	Candidate	Votes	%	±%
INC	Apurba Sarkar	81,723	51.22	▲5.12
AITC	Santanu Sen	60,943	38.2	New
BJP	Binay Bhushan Das	9,317	5.84	▲2.82
NOTA	None of the above	2,464	1.54	
Majority		20,780	13.02	
Turnout		1,59,553	76.64	▼4.27
INC hold		Swing		

=== 2011 ===
In the 2011 election, Apurba Sarkar of Congress defeated his nearest rival Ainal Haque of CPI.

West Bengal assembly elections, 2011: Kandi constituency
Party	Candidate	Votes	%	±%
INC	Apurba Sarkar	66,513	46.10	▲13.59
CPI	Ainal Haque	58,703	40.68	▲7.64
Independent	Sahitya Pradip Sinha	9,836	6.82	
BJP	Dhananjoy Mandal	4,351	3.02	
BSP	Amit Kumar Das	1,429		
CPI(ML)L	Manirul Islam	1,254		
Independent	Sasti Konai	850		
JD(U)	Nazimul Islam	736		
MLKSC	Majibur Rahaman Sheikh	615		
Turnout		1,44,287	80.91	
INC hold		Swing	▼21.51	

Sahitya Pradip Sinha, contesting as an independent, was reportedly backed by Trinamool Congress.

.# Swing calculated on Congress+Rebel Congress (Independent) vote percentages taken together in 2006. Calculated only on the vote percentages secured by Apurba Sarakar in 2006 and 2011 the swing is +3.59%.

=== 2006 ===
In the 2006 state assembly elections Apurba Sarkar, Independent, won the 68 Kandi assembly seat defeating his nearest rival Abdul Hamid of CPI. Apurba Sarkar, contesting as an independent, was a rebel congress candidate put up by Adhir Choudhury as a protest against the official Congress candidate Atish Sinha. He was subsequently taken back into the Congress. Contests in most years were multi cornered but only winners and runners are being mentioned. Atish Chandra Sinha of Congress defeated Chandan Sen of CPI in 2001, Syed Wahid Reza of CPI in 1996 and 1991. Syed Wahid Reza of CPI defeated Bankim Trivedi of Congress in 1987. Atish Chandra Sinha of Congress defeated Syed Abdur Razzaque of CPI in 1982 and Jagadish Sinha of Janata Party in 1977.

=== 1972 ===
Atish Chandra Sinha won in 1972 and 1971. Kumar Jagadish Chandra Sinha, Independent, won in 1969. G. Trivedi of Congress won in 1967. Kumar Jagadish Chandra Sinha of Congress won in 1962. Kandi was a joint seat in 1957. Sudhir Mondal and Bimal Chandra Sinha, both of Congress, won the seat jointly. In independent India's first election in 1951 Goalbadan Trivedi of Congress won from the Kandi seat.
