= Kandi, Murshidabad =

Kandi
- Town
- Nickname: Rice Store of Murshidabad
- Interactive map of Kandi
- Location in West Bengal, India Kandi (India)
- Coordinates: 23.95°N 88.03°E
- Country: India
- State: West Bengal
- District: Murshidabad
- Established: 1869

Government
  - Type: Municipality
  - Body: Kandi Municipality
  - Chairman: Joydev Ghatak —TMC

Area
  - Total: 12.97 km^{2} (5.01 sq mi)
- Elevation: 25 m (82 ft)

Population (2011)
  - Total: 55,632
  - Density: 4,289/km^{2} (11,110/sq mi)

Languages
  - Official: Bengali, English
- Time zone: UTC+5:30 (IST)
- Postal Code: 742137, 742138, 742139, 742140
- Vehicle registration: WB99
- Lok Sabha constituency: Baharampore
- Vidhan Sabha constituency: Kandi

Kandi is a sub-divisional town and municipality in Murshidabad district in West Bengal, India. It is the headquarters of the Kandi subdivision and is located on the east bank of Kana Mayurakshi River. The town is known for being one of the oldest municipal bodies in India, having acquired municipality status in 1869. The area is also known as the 'rice store' of Murshidabad district, owing to its large production of rice.

== Geography ==
Cities, towns and locations in the Berhampore and Kandi subdivisions, Murshidabad district
M: municipal town, CT: census town, R: rural/ urban centre, H: historical centres
Owing to space constraints in the small map, the actual locations in a larger map may vary slightly

=== Location ===
The above map covers the Kandi and Berhampore subdivisions, which are spread across both the natural physiographic regions of the district: Rarh and Bagri. Kandi is 30 km (19 mi) away from Berhampore, the district headquarters of Murshidabad, and approximately 195 km (121 mi) from Kolkata, the capital of West Bengal. It is near two other districts: Burdwan (32 km) Nadia (30 km) and Birbhum (21 km). According to the District Census Handbook, Murshidabad (2011), Kandi covers an area of 12.97 km^{2}.

The ruins of Karnasubarna, the capital of Shashanka, the first important king of ancient Bengal who ruled in the 7th century, is located 9.6 kilometres (6.0 mi) south-west of Berhampore. The entire area is overwhelmingly rural, with over 80% of the population living in the rural areas.

Note: The map alongside presents some of the notable locations in the subdivisions. All places marked in the map are linked in the larger full screen map.

=== Geography ===
Kandi is located in the Mayurakshi River basin. The area is drained by three main river systems: the Mayurakshi–Bele, the Brahmani–Dwarka, and the Bakreshwar–Kopai–Kuye. All the three systems combine into one and finally flow into the Bhagirathi River through the Babla–Uttarasan system. These river systems carry huge discharges during monsoon season, causing wide-spread flooding and drainage congestion in Kandi and adjoining areas, as most of the decades-old embankments are in dilapidated conditions. During floods, the area can be totally cut off from other parts of the district for days, making the transport of relief materials and rapid evacuation challenging. In 2015, the average annual damage caused by these problems is ₹97.55 crore (equivalent to ₹147 crore or US$15 million in 2023).

== Demographics ==
According to the 2011 census of India, Kandi had a total population of 55,632, of which 28,442 (51%) were males and 27,190 (49%) were females. Population in the age range 0–6 years was 5,889. The total number of literate persons in Kandi was 40,816 (82.05% of the population over 6 years).

As of the 2001 census of India, Kandi had a population of 50,345. Males constitute 53% of the population and females 47%. Kandi has an average literacy rate of 65%, higher than the national average of 59.5%: male literacy is 70%, and female literacy is 60%. In Kandi, 14% of the population is under 6 years of age.

== Economy ==
Economically, the area produces handloom textiles, tobacco, bell metal products. It has branch offices of 7 nationalised banks, 3 private commercial bank, 1 cooperative bank, 2 agricultural credit societies, and 45 non-agricultural credit societies. Among medical facilities, it has 2 hospitals with 200 beds (the governmental Kandi Subdivision Hospital is in the center of the town), one tuberculosis clinic, one non-government nursing home, and one veterinary hospital.

=== Banking and financial services ===
- State Bank of India, Main Branch
- State Bank of India, Bus Stand Branch
- State Bank of India, C.C. Rasorah
- Punjab National Bank
- INDIAN Bank, Main Road - Beside of LICI Building
- Bank of Baroda, Khorsa-High Road
- Bank of India, Petrol Pump-High Road
- Bangiya Gramin Vikash Bank, Zemo Branch -School Road
- Oriental Bank of Commerce, Hospital Road
- IDBI Bank, Hospital Road
- HDFC BANK LTD, Hospital Road
- ICICI BANK LTD, BUS STAND
- Canara Bank, School Road
- Kandi Co-Operative Credit Society, Girls School More
- Life Insurance Corporation Of India, Main Road Branch
- Axis Bank, Girls School More
- Bandhan Bank Near Police Station
- The New India Assurance Company Limited, Petrol Pump-High Road
- K.D.C.M.P.U. Ltd (Amul)

=== Tourism and festivals ===
Some popular tourist spots and festivals of Kandi include:

- Netaji Shubash Park
- Narayandhar Park
- Radhaballav Mandir, Kandi
- Kandi Rajbari
- Shyamsagar Par
- Radhasagar Par
- Jemo Rajbati
- Dakhina Kali Mandir
- Gopal Tungi Mandir
- Panchamukhi Shib Mandir
- Bagdanga Rudradev Mandir
- Kali puja of Eroali
- Kali puja of Gokarna
- Sarbamangala Temple of Jajan

== Transport ==
=== Roadways ===
Kandi Town is the gateway of Murshidabad district, as 10 districts of South Bengal are directly connected to it. Kandi is well connected by road to places like Berhampur, Suri, Bolpur, Tarapith, Rampurhat, Burdwan, Katwa, and Asansol. The SH-11 passes through Kandi.

Public transport systems in Kandi Town include government and private buses, electric rickshaws, taxis, and auto rickshaws.

== Railways ==
There is no railway station in Kandi. The nearest ones are:

- Salar on the Barharwa–Azimganj–Katwa loop line (25 km away)
- Chowrigacha on the Barharwa–Azimganj–Katwa loop line (15 KM)
- Khagraghat Road (KGLE) railway station on the Barharwa–Azimganj–Katwa loop line (28 km away)
- Berhampur on the Sealdah–Lalgola line (34 km away)
- Sainthia Junction on the Sahibganj loop line (39 km away)
- Kurmodanga (Futisanko) on the Ahmadpur–Katwa line (34 km away)

== Education ==
Among educational facilities, the Kandi area has 30 primary schools, 1 middle school, 4 secondary schools, 4 senior secondary schools, and 2 general degree colleges. It has 19 non-formal education centre (Sarva Shiksha Abhiyan) and one specialised school for the disabled.

=== Colleges ===
Kandi Raj College was established in 1950 by the Kandi Raj family of Kandi. Affiliated to the University of Kalyani, it has the following departments: Physics, Chemistry, Mathematics, Computer Science, Bengali, English, Sanskrit, History, Geography, Political science, Philosophy and Economics.

Raja Birendra Chandra College was established in 1965 at Kandi. It was earlier known as Kandi Raj College of Commerce. Affiliated to the University of Kalyani, it offers honours courses in Bengali, English, Sanskrit, history, geography and BCom.

Bimal Chandra College of Law was established at Kandi in 2002 with the untiring efforts of Atish Chandra Sinha, a doyen of the Kandi Raj family. It is affiliated with the University of Kalyani and approved by the Bar Council of India.

=== Schools ===
- Kandi Raj High School
- Kandi Raja Manindra Chandra Girls' High School
- Jemo N.N High School
- Sri Bishnu High School
- Bahara Adarsha Vidyapith
- Bahara Girls School
- Bagdanga R.S.S Vidyapith (high school)
- Bagdanga P.C. Girls School
- Chatinakandi Gurupada High School
- Namukandi High School
- Rasorah Ambika High School
- Saraswati Devi Public High School (affiliated to C.B.S.E.)
- Jagriti Public School (affiliated to C.B.S.E)

Regional development in education began when Kandi Raj High School was established by converting a theatre owned by the Zamindars of the Kandi Raj family. This was done on an appeal by Pandit Ishwar Chandra Vidyasagar, the eminent educationist and social reformer during the renaissance in Bengal. The Zamindar family, commonly referred to as Rajas, have contributed to the spread of education; in particular, they have taken initiative and built momentum for female education in and around the Kandi subdivision.

== Arts and culture ==
The region has a local sweet confectionery called monohara.

== Notable people ==
- Ramendra Sundar Tribedi – scientist and writer
- Byomkes Chakrabarti – linguist and educationist
- Atish Chandra Sinha – nationalist and politician
- Bikash Chandra Sinha – physicist and scientist
- Madanmohan Tarkalankar - Sanskrit Scholar

== Temples and Religious Centers ==
- Radhaballav Mandir: prominent temple in Kandi.
- Dakhina Kali Mandir: temple dedicated to the goddess Kali.
- Gopal Tungi Mandir: Another notable temple in the area.

== See also ==
- Kandi (Community development block)
