= Bayron Biswas =

Indian politician (born 1982)

Member of the West Bengal Legislative Assembly
- Incumbent
- Assumed office 23 March 2023
- Preceded by: Subrata Saha
- Constituency: Sagardighi, Murshidabad
- Majority: 34,260

Personal details
- Born: 13 August 1982 (age 44) Samserganj, West Bengal, India
- Party: Trinamool Congress (2023–2026) Democratic Trinamool Congress (2026 - present)
- Other political affiliations: Indian National Congress (until 2023)
- Occupation: Businessman, Social worker, Politician

Bayron Biswas (born 13 August 1982) is an Indian Politician, Businessman and Social worker who is serving as an MLA of the West Bengal Legislative Assembly from Sagardighi in Murshidabad. He is a member of the Trinamool Congress and before joining that party, he was the sole MLA in West Bengal belonging to the Indian National Congress. Backed by CPI(M)-led Left Front, he defeated the TMC candidate by 22,986 votes during the 2023 bypoll in Sagardighi. He joined TMC on 29 May 2023 in the presence of party general secretary Abhishek Banerjee. In 2026 West Bengal Legislative Assembly elections, he won the election by securing 90,781 votes, defeating the Bharatiya Janata Party candidate, Tapas Chakraborty.
