= Promothes Mukherjee =

Indian politician (born 1946)

Promothes Mukherjee, born 17 January 1946, in Singhari, Murshidabad district, West Bengal), was a leader of Revolutionary Socialist Party (RSP).

He served as member of the Lok Sabha representing Baharampur (Lok Sabha constituency). He was elected to the 11th, 12th and 13th Lok Sabha. Mukherjee died at the age of 79 in Kolkata in 2025.
