= Jiban Krishna Saha =

Indian politician

Member of the West Bengal Legislative Assembly
- In office 2 May 2021 – 4 May 2026
- Preceded by: Protima Rajak
- Succeeded by: Sukhen Kumar Bagdi
- Constituency: Burwan

Personal details
- Born: 1 January 1977 (age 49) Andi,Murshidabad
- Party: Trinamool Congress
- Profession: Politician

Jiban Krishna Saha, is an Indian politician and a MLA from Trinamool Congress elected from the Burwan constituency in the 2021 West Bengal Legislative Assembly election. On 17 April 2023 he was arrested by CBI at 5 am in connection with alleged State School Service Commission (SSC) recruitment scam. On August 25, 2025, he has been arrested by ED for same.

== Controversy ==
On April 14, CBI raided Jiban Krishna Saha's house. It is seen that he threw his two phones in the pond to escape from the CBI and also tries to escape from the top of his boundary wall but fails in the end. Then after 65 hours of continuous search in the pond, his two phones were found. And a number of mark sheets inside a bag, were found in his garden. On April 17, 2023, he was arrested by the CBI at 5 am in connection with alleged State School Service Commission (SSC) recruitment scam. On 14 May 2024 he was given bail by the court.

On 25 August 2025 ED raided Jiban and his kins residence in connection to SSC recruitment scam, he also tried to escape from the officials but was subsequently arrested.
