= Burwan Assembly constituency =

West Bengal Legislative Assembly constituency

Burwan
- Constituency No. 67 for the West Bengal Legislative Assembly
- Interactive Map Outlining Burwan Assembly Constituency

Constituency details
- Country: India
- Region: East India
- State: West Bengal
- District: Murshidabad
- Lok Sabha constituency: Baharampur
- Established: 1951
- Total electors: 217,500
- Reservation: SC

Member of Legislative Assembly
- 18th West Bengal Legislative Assembly
- Incumbent Sukhen Kumar Bagdi
- Party: BJP
- Alliance: NDA
- Elected year: 2026
- Preceded by: Jiban Krishna Saha

Burwan Assembly constituency is an assembly constituency in Murshidabad district in the Indian state of West Bengal. It is reserved for scheduled castes.

Most Successful parties from Burwan assembly
1. Indian National Congress (5 times) (31.2%)
2. Revolutionary Socialist Party (9 times) (56.2%)
3. All India Trinamool Congress (1 time) (6.25%)
4. Bharatiya Janata Party (2 times) (6.25%)

== Overview ==
As per orders of the Delimitation Commission, No. 67 Burwan Assembly constituency (SC) covers Biprasekhar, Burwan I, Burwan II, Kharjuna, Kuli, Kurunnorun, Panchthupi, Sabaldaha, Sabalpur, Sahora and Sundarpur gram panchayats of Burwan community development block and Gadda, Jajan and Gundiria gram panchayats of Bharatpur I community development block.

Burwan Assembly constituency is part of No. 10 Baharampur Lok Sabha constituency.

== Members of the Legislative Assembly ==
Year	Name	Party
1951	Satyendra Chandra Ghosh Moulik	Indian National Congress
1951	Sudhir Mondal	Indian National Congress
1957	No seat	
1962	No seat	
1967	Amalendralal Roy	Revolutionary Socialist Party
1969	Amalendralal Roy	Revolutionary Socialist Party
1971	Sunil Mohan Ghosh Moulik	Indian National Congress
1972	Sunil Mohan Ghosh Moulik	Indian National Congress
1977	Amalendralal Roy	Revolutionary Socialist Party
1982	Amalendralal Roy	Revolutionary Socialist Party
1987	Amalendralal Roy	Revolutionary Socialist Party
1991	Debabrata Banerjee	Revolutionary Socialist Party
1996	Debabrata Banerjee	Revolutionary Socialist Party
2001	Amalendralal Roy	Revolutionary Socialist Party
2006	Biswanath Banerjee	Revolutionary Socialist Party
2011	Protima Rajak	Indian National Congress
2016	Protima Rajak	Indian National Congress
2021	Jiban Krishna Saha	Trinamool Congress
2026	Sukhen Kumar Bagdi	Bharatiya Janata Party

== Election results ==
=== 2026 ===
2026 West Bengal Legislative Assembly election: Burwan
Party	Candidate	Votes	%	±%
BJP	Sukhen Kumar Bagdi	91,661	48.52	▲3.76
AITC	Protima Rajak	69,361	36.72	▼9.6
INC	Sanjit Das	18,440	9.76	▲2.83
RSP	Ananda Das Bagdi	2,647	1.4	
NOTA	None of the above	2,500	1.32	▲0.18
Majority		22,300	11.8	▲10.24
Turnout		188,917	87.91	▲6.62
BJP gain from AITC		Swing		

=== 2021 ===
2021 West Bengal Legislative Assembly election: Burwan
Party	Candidate	Votes	%	±%
AITC	Jiban Krishna Saha	81,890	46.32	
BJP	Amiya Kumar Das	79,141	44.76	
INC	Shiladitya Haldar	12,260	6.93	
NOTA	None of the above	2,008	1.14	
Majority		2,749	1.56	
Turnout		176,803	81.29	
AITC gain from INC		Swing		

=== 2016 ===
2016 West Bengal Legislative Assembly election: Burwan
Party	Candidate	Votes	%	±%
INC	Protima Rajak	55,906	36.99	▼10.2
AITC	Shasthi Charan Mal	40,904	26.99	New
RSP	Binoy Sarkar	33,040	21.8	▼24.85
BJP	Amiya Kumar Das	15,440	10.19	▲3.93
NOTA	None of the Above	3,290	2.17	N/A
SP	Ranjit Das	1,876	1.24	New
Independent	Jata Shankar Thandar	1,094	0.72	New
Majority		15,002	9.9	▲9.46
Turnout		1,51,550	77.95	▼5.29
INC hold		Swing		

=== 2011 ===
In the 2011 election, Protima Rajak of Congress defeated her nearest rival Binoy Sarkar of RSP.

2011 West Bengal state assembly election: Burwan
Party	Candidate	Votes	%	±%
INC	Protima Rajak	66,304	47.09	−1.60#
RSP	Binoy Sarkar	65,688	46.65	−1.36
BJP	Sukhnen Kumar Bagdi	8,809	6.26	
Turnout		140,801	83.31	
INC gain from RSP		Swing	▼0.24	

.# Swing calculated on Congress+Trinamool Congress vote percentages taken together in 2006. Considering the Congress vote percentage alone in 2006, the swing was +5.37%.

=== 2006 ===
2006 West Bengal Legislative Assembly election: Barwan
Party	Candidate	Votes	%	±%
RSP	Biswa Nath Banerjee	61,311	48.01	
INC	Arit Majumder	57,058	44.68	
AITC	Imran Hossen	5,117	4.01	
IND	Sri Rabindra Nath Roy	2,574	2.02	
IND	Jane Alam Seikh	1,636	1.28	
Majority		4,253	3.33	
Turnout		127,696	80.69	
RSP hold		Swing		

=== 2001 ===
2001 West Bengal Legislative Assembly election: Barwan
Party	Candidate	Votes	%	±%
RSP	Amalendralal Roy	54,314	46.75	
INC	Tapas Dasgupta	45,645	39.29	
PDS	Asish Roychowdhury	7,007	6.03	
BJP	Samir Kumar Mondal	5,943	5.12	
IND	Amit Rajak	1,843	1.59	
JD(U)	Syed Jahangir Kabir	1,418	1.22	
Majority		8,669	7.46	
Turnout		116,270	72.38	
RSP hold		Swing		

=== 1996 ===
1996 West Bengal Legislative Assembly election: Barwan
Party	Candidate	Votes	%	±%
RSP	Debabrata Banerjee	59,537	50.57	
INC	Ali Hossain Mondal	49,335	41.90	
BJP	Jitendranath Ghosh	8,120	6.90	
IND	Sasti Charan Mal	360	0.31	
SAP	Mofaza Khatun	299	0.25	
AMB	Sujit Kumar Ghosh	80	0.07	
Majority		10,202	8.67	
Turnout		120,268	78.96	
RSP hold		Swing		

=== 1991 ===
1991 West Bengal Legislative Assembly election: Barwan
Party	Candidate	Votes	%	±%
RSP	Debabratta Bandapadyay	52,144	49.95	
INC	Sudip Mohan Ghosh Moulik	28,942	27.73	
BJP	Shyamal Gupta	21,758	20.84	
Majority		23,202	22.22	
Turnout		107,685	73.02	
RSP hold		Swing		
