= Byomkes Chakrabarti =

Bengali linguist and writer

Byomkes Chakrabarti (also spelled Byomkesh Chakraborty or Byomkesh Chakrabarty) (1923–1981) was a Bengali research worker on ethnic languages. He was also an educationist and a poet. His major contribution to linguistics was in finding out some basic relationship between Santali and the Bengali language. He showed how the Bengali language has unique characteristics, absent in other Indian languages, under the influence of Santali. His contribution was fundamental to research on the origin and development of the Bengali language and provided scopes of research in newer horizons in linguistics.

== Life ==
Byomkes Chakrabarti, son of Sarat Chandra Chakrabarti and Sitala Sundari Chakrabarti, was born in Kharar-Gopinathpur village in the Paschim Medinipur district of West Bengal, India, in 1923.

He took his M.A. degrees in English and Bengali from Calcutta University. He was the first Ph.D. on the Santali language from this university. Chakrabarti came in close contact with Suniti Kumar Chatterji and Sukumar Sen as their student and imbibed aptitude for linguistic studies from these teachers in the field. His acquaintance with the tribal bases of the Midnapur district induced him to study their culture. He concentrated on the Santali culture in particular and acquired sound knowledge of Santali language. He carried on systematic research on the comparative study of Santali and Bengali languages.

Chakrabarti started his career as a head master and subsequently held the position of the Principal in Seva Bharati Mahavidyalaya in Kapgari, Jhargram, West Midnapur district and Raja Birendra Chandra College in Kandi, Murshidabad district of West Bengal.

== Research work ==
Chakrabarti's work covered all the aspects of phonetics and phonology, morphology, syntax, semantics and general characteristics of the languages in literature and vocabulary. Santali, belonging to the Austroasiatic family and having a tradition traceable from pre-Aryan days retained its distinct identity and co-existed with Bengali, a language belonging to the Indo-Aryan family, in Bengal. This affiliation is generally accepted, but there are many cross-questions and puzzles.

In modern Indian languages like Western Hindi the steps of evolution from Midland Prakrit Sauraseni can be traced clearly. In the case of Bengali such steps of evolution are not always clear and distinct. One has to look at other influences that moulded Bengali's essential characteristics. Chakrabarti investigated the complex process of assimilation of non-Aryan elements, particularly the Santali elements, by Bengali and he showed the overwhelming influence of Bengali on Santali. His formulations are based on the detailed study of reciprocal influences on all aspects of both the languages and try to bring out the unique features of the languages.

== Bibliography ==
- B. Chakrabarti, A Comparative Study of Santali and Bengali, Halud Dupure, Jiban ar Kabita, Collected works of Byomkes Chakrabarti, Sahityika, Khargapurer Itihas, Pahar Puja in Dhalbhum
- Sk. Israil, Alor Arale (Nabapatra Prakashan, Kolkata, 2007)
- Sukumar Sen, Diner Pare Din je Gelo (Ananda Publishers, Kolkata, 2001)
- Sukumar Sen, Bangla Sahityer Itihas, Vol. 3 (Ananda Publishers, Kolkata)
- Suhrid Kumar Bhowmik, Saotali Bhasay Rabindrasahityer Anubad Prasange (P-106, JAGAJJYOTI, Professor Kazo Azuma felicitation volume, Bouddha Dharmankur Sabha, 2001, ISBN 978-81-86551-21-9)
