= Kanai Chandra Mondal =

Indian politician

Member of the West Bengal Legislative Assembly
- In office 13 May 2011 – 5 May 2026
- Preceded by: Mukul Mondal
- Succeeded by: Dilip Saha
- Constituency: Nabagram

Personal details
- Born: July 14, 1954 (age 72)
- Party: Bharatiya Janata Party
- Other political affiliations: Trinamool Congress; Communist Party of India (Marxist)
- Profession: Politician

Kanai Chandra Mondal (born 14 July 1954) is an Indian politician from West Bengal. He is a three time elected Member of the West Bengal Legislative Assembly from 2011, 2016 as a member of Communist Party of India (Marxist), and 2021, representing Nabagram Assembly constituency as a member of the Trinamool Congress.

== See also ==
- 2021 West Bengal Legislative Assembly election
- West Bengal Legislative Assembly
