= Braja Bhusan Gupta =

Indian politician (1869–1940)

- Born: 1869; British India at Baniakhali village, Domkal subdivision, Murshidabad district
- Died: 1940 (aged 70–71)
- Occupations: Politician, lawyer, social activist
- Known for: Active participation in the Indian freedom struggle

Braja Bhusan Gupta (1869–1940) was a Bengali nationalist politician, lawyer and active participant of the Indian freedom struggle.

== Early life ==
Gupta was born in British India at Baniakhali village, in Domkal subdivision, Murshidabad district. His father's name was Binodilal Gupta. He joined the anti Partition of Bengal (1905) movement in 1905.

== Career ==
Gupta was a Gandhian politician and social worker. He was an eminent lawyer of his time, with immense knowledge of philosophy and English Literature. He established Jatiya Adarsha Vidyalaya in Baharampur. In 1921 District Congress Committee, Murshidabad was formed under his presidentship. Being the first president of the district committee of the Indian National Congress Gupta met top political leaders like Subhas Chandra Bose, Sarojini Naidu and even Mahatma Gandhi. He hosted Desbandhu Chittaranjan Das in spite of the police threat in his home. He presided over the Krishnath College School first Jela Chatra Sammilani (District Students' Conference) in 1927.
