= Adhir Ranjan Chowdhury =

Indian politician (born 1956)

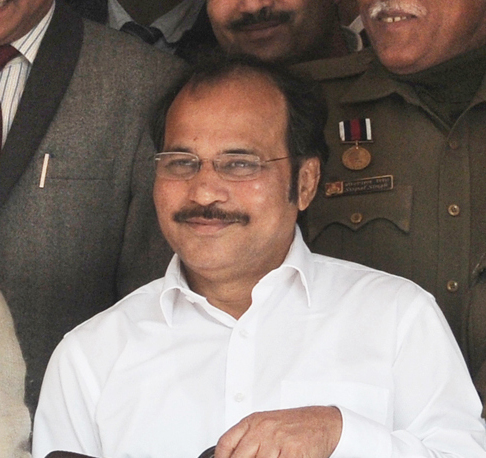
- Chowdhury in 2014

Member of Parliament, Lok Sabha
- In office 6 October 1999 – 4 June 2024
- Preceded by: Promothes Mukherjee
- Succeeded by: Yusuf Pathan
- Constituency: Baharampur

Chairperson of Public Accounts Committee
- In office 26 July 2019 – 5 June 2024
- Appointed by: Om Birla (Speaker of the Lok Sabha)
- Preceded by: Mallikarjun Kharge
- Succeeded by: K. C. Venugopal

Leader of the Indian National Congress in Lok Sabha
- In office 18 July 2021 – 4 June 2024
- Deputy: Gaurav Gogoi
- Preceded by: Ravneet Singh Bittu
- Succeeded by: Rahul Gandhi (Note: As Leader of the Indian National Congress, Gandhi also served as the Leader of the Opposition)
- In office 16 June 2019 – 11 March 2021
- Preceded by: Mallikarjun Kharge
- Succeeded by: Ravneet Singh Bittu

President of West Bengal Pradesh Congress Committee
- In office 9 September 2020 – 21 September 2024
- AICC President: Sonia Gandhi; Mallikarjun Kharge
- Preceded by: Somendra Nath Mitra
- Succeeded by: Subhankar Sarkar
- In office 11 February 2014 – 22 September 2018
- AICC President: Sonia Gandhi; Rahul Gandhi
- Preceded by: Pradip Bhattacharya
- Succeeded by: Somendra Nath Mitra

Union Minister of State for Railways
- In office 28 October 2012 – 26 May 2014
- Prime Minister: Manmohan Singh
- Preceded by: K. J. Surya Prakash Reddy
- Succeeded by: Manoj Sinha; Rajen Gohain

Member of West Bengal Legislative Assembly
- In office 10 May 1996 – 6 October 1999
- Preceded by: Sisir Sarkar
- Succeeded by: Nripen Chaudhuri
- Constituency: Nabagram

Personal details
- Born: 2 April 1956 (age 70) Berhampore, West Bengal, India
- Party: Indian National Congress
- Spouse: Arpita Chowdhury (m. 1987; died 2019); Atasi Chattopadhyaya Chowdhury
- Children: 2
- Profession: Social worker; politician

Adhir Ranjan Chowdhury (born 2 April 1956) is an Indian politician who served as the leader of the Indian National Congress in the 17th Lok Sabha (de-facto Leader of Opposition) from 2019 to 2024 and the Member of Parliament from Berhampore from 1999 to 2024. He has served as the president of West Bengal Pradesh Congress Committee (WBPCC) following the demise of Somendra Nath Mitra from 2020 to 2024. and previously from 2014 to 2018, Chairperson of Public Accounts Committee since 2019 till 2024, Minister of State of Railways from 2012 to 2014 and the member of the West Bengal Legislative Assembly from 1996 to 1999.

== Personal life ==
Chowdhury was born on 2 April 1956 to Niranjan and Saroja Bala Chowdhury at Berhampore in Murshidabad district, West Bengal. He studied at I. C. Institute in Berhampore. Chowdhury married Arpita Chowdhury on 15 September 1987. They had a daughter, Shreyashi, who died in October 2006. On 9 January 2019, Arpita died. He later married Atashi C Chowdhury.

== Political career ==
In the 1970s, Choudhary was involved with the Naxalism movement. He joined the Indian National Congress party during the premiership of Rajiv Gandhi. In 1991, he contested the West Bengal Legislative Assembly election from Nabagram constituency. During the polling, he was chased by 300 supporters of the Communist Party of India (Marxist) and held hostage by its candidate. Chowdhury lost by a margin of 1,401 votes. In 1996, he was elected from the same constituency. Chowdhury polled 76,852 votes and won by a margin of approximately 20,329 votes.

Chowdhury contested the 1999 Indian general election from Berhampore constituency. He won by a margin of 95,391 votes and defeated his nearest rival, the sitting MP Pramothes Mukherjee of Revolutionary Socialist Party. Following his success, he was made the Congress president for the Murshidabad district. Between 1999 and 2000, he served as a member of Committee on Information Technology, Railway Convention Committee and Committee to Review the Rate of Dividend Payable by the Railway Undertaking to the General Revenues. Between 2000 and 2004, he served as a member of Consultative Committee of the Ministry of External Affairs. In 2003, under Chowdhury's leadership, the Congress party won 23 out of 33 zilla parishad seats, 13 out of 26 panchayat samitis and 104 out of 254 village councils in Murshidabad.

On 28 October 2012 he was inducted in the Union Ministry under Prime Minister Manmohan Singh as Minister of State for Railways.

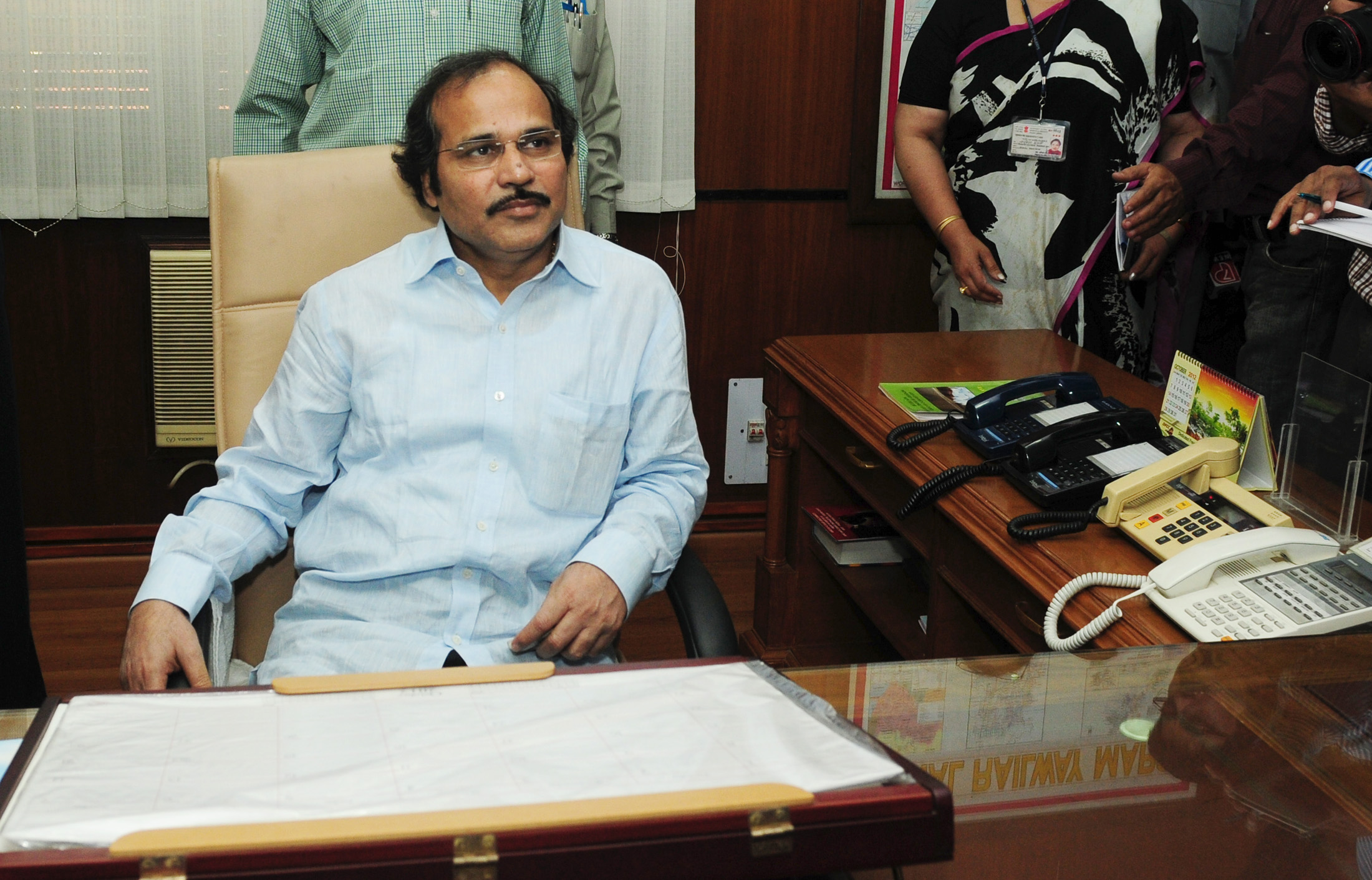
Chowdhury taking charge as the Minister of State for Railways, in New Delhi on 29 October 2012

He became the president of West Bengal Pradesh Congress on 10 February 2014.

=== Leader of the Congress in Lok Sabha ===
In June 2019, he was selected as Congress leader in Lok Sabha. According to a report in NDTV, Adhir Ranjan Chowdhury was given the job after the party failed to convince Rahul Gandhi. On 26 July 2019, Chowdhury was appointed the chairman of Seventeenth Lok Sabha Committee on Public Accounts. The Public Accounts Committee is now constituted every year under Rule 308 of the Rules of Procedure and Conduct of Business in Lok Sabha.

After the death of Somen Mitra, the then president of West Bengal Pradesh Congress Committee, on 9 September 2020, Chowdhury was appointed the president of West Bengal Pradesh Congress Committee.

=== Upset election defeat and resignation ===
In an electoral upset, Chowdhury faced defeat in the INC's bastion Berhampore by the TMC-fielded former cricketer Yusuf Pathan by more than 85,000 votes in the 2024 Indian general election. Following INC's debacle in West Bengal, Chowdhury resigned as president of WBPCC on 21 June 2024.

== Election history ==
=== Lok Sabha ===
Year	Constituency	Party	Votes	%	Opponent	Opponent Party	Opponent Votes	%	Result	Margin	%
2024	Baharampur	INC	439,494	31.74	Yusuf Pathan	AITC	524,516	37.88	Lost	-85,022	-6.14
2019	Baharampur	INC	591,147	45.47	Apurba Sarkar (David)	AITC	510,410	39.26	Won	80,737	6.21
2014	Baharampur	INC	583,549	50.54	Indranil Sen	AITC	226,982	19.69	Won	356,567	30.85
2009	Baharampur	INC	541,920	56.91	Promothes Mukherjee	RSP	354,943	37.27	Won	186,977	19.64
2004	Baharampur	INC	508,095	51.50	Promothes Mukherjee	RSP	409,194	41.40	Won	98,901	10.10
1999	Baharampur	INC	434,073	46.86	Promothes Mukherjee	RSP	338,683	36.56	Won	95,390	10.30

=== West Bengal Legislative Assembly ===
Year	Constituency	Party	Votes	%	Opponent	Party	Opponent Votes	%	Margin	Margin in%	Result
2026	Baharampur	INC	73,540	32.79%	Subrata Maitra	BJP	91,088	40.61%	17,548	7.82%	Lost
1996	Nabagram	INC	76,852	55.84%	Muzaffar Hossain	CPI(M)	56,523	41.07%	20,329	14.77%	Won

== Notes ==
Lok Sabha
Preceded by Mallikarjun Kharge	Leader of the Opposition in Lok Sabha; 2019 – 2024	Succeeded by Rahul Gandhi
Lok Sabha
Preceded by Promothes Mukherjee	Member of Parliament for Berhampore; 1999 – 2024	Succeeded by Yusuf Pathan
Party political offices
Preceded by Pradip Bhattacharya	President of West Bengal Pradesh Congress Committee; 10 February 2014 – 21 September 2018	Succeeded by Somen Mitra
Preceded by Somen Mitra	President of West Bengal Pradesh Congress Committee; 9 September 2020 – August 2024	
Preceded by Mallikarjun Kharge	Leader of the Indian National Congress in the Lok Sabha; 16 June 2019 – 11 March 2021	Succeeded by Ravneet Singh Bittu
Preceded by Ravneet Singh Bittu	Leader of the Indian National Congress in the Lok Sabha; 18 July 2021 – 4 June 2024	Succeeded by Rahul Gandhi
