= Gargi Das Ghosh =

Indian politician (born 1965)

Minister of State, Government of West Bengal
- Incumbent
- Assumed office 1 June 2026
- Governor: R. N. Ravi
- Chief Minister: Suvendu Adhikari

Member of the West Bengal Legislative Assembly
- Incumbent
- Assumed office 9 May 2026
- Preceded by: Apurba Sarkar
- Constituency: Kandi

Personal details
- Born: 1965 (age 60–61)
- Party: Bharatiya Janata Party
- Profession: Politician

Gargi Das Ghosh (born 1965) is an Indian politician from West Bengal. She is a member of the West Bengal Legislative Assembly from Kandi representing the Bharatiya Janata Party.She is currently serving as the Minister of State of West Bengal.

== Early life and education ==
Das Ghosh was born to Ramkrishna Ghosh. She is associated with LPG cooking gas business activities. Her spouse is engaged in the operation of a petrol pump, residential hotel, foreign liquor shop and bar-cum-restaurant. She graduated from Karnataka State Open University, Mysore, in 2015.

== Political career ==
Das Ghosh won the Kandi seat in the 2026 West Bengal Legislative Assembly election as a candidate of the Bharatiya Janata Party. She received 73,355 votes and defeated Apurba Sarkar of the All India Trinamool Congress by a margin of 10,335 votes.
