= Bikash Sinha =

Indian physicist (1945–2023)

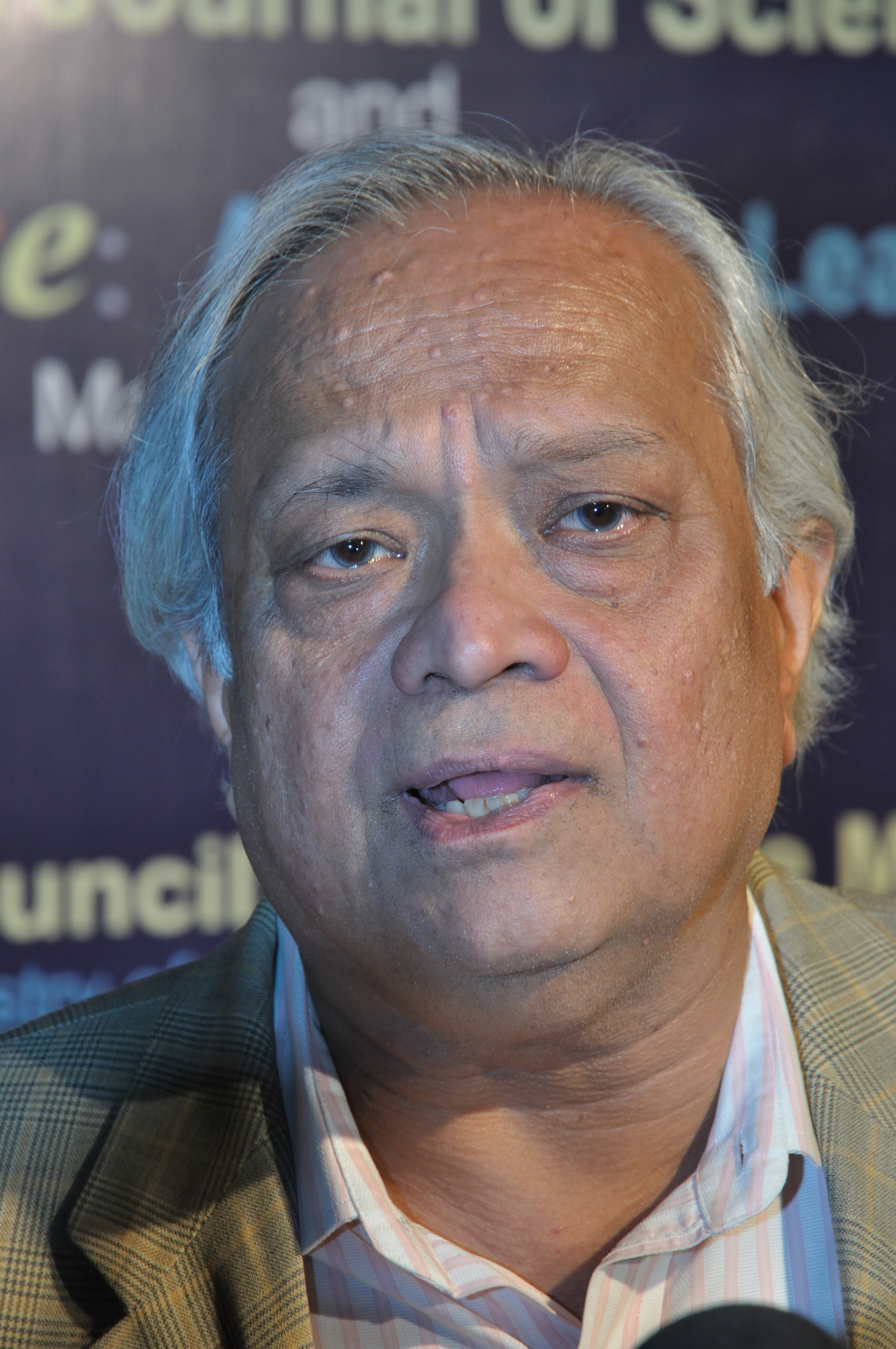
- Sinha in 2010
- Born: 16 June 1945; Kandi, Murshidabad district, Bengal Province, British India
- Died: 11 August 2023 (aged 78); Minto Park, Kolkata, West Bengal, India
- Education: Calcutta University (BSc); Cambridge University (BA); London University (MA, PhD, DSc)
- Known for: High energy physics; nuclear physics
- Awards: Padma Bhusan (2010); Rabindra Puraskar (2022)
- Scientific career
- Fields: Physics

Bikash Sinha (16 June 1945 – 11 August 2023) was an Indian physicist who was active in the fields of nuclear physics and high energy physics. Sinha was the director of the Saha Institute of Nuclear Physics and Variable Energy Cyclotron Centre and the chairman of the Board of Governors of the National Institute of Technology, Durgapur in June 2005. He was also a member of scientific advisory board to the Prime Minister of India.

== Early life and education ==
Bikash Sinha was born on 16 June 1945 in Kandi, Murshidabad. He studied physics for his bachelor's degree at Presidency College, Kolkata from 1961 to 1964, graduating with high honors. He then proceeded to King's College, Cambridge, for higher studies in his subject.

== Career ==
Sinha joined Bhabha Atomic Research Centre, Mumbai in 1976 after returning from England and was Director of Variable Energy Cyclotron Centre, where he was the Homi Bhabha Chair Professor. He retired from service as the director of Variable Energy Cyclotron Centre and the Saha Institute of Nuclear Physics in June 2009.

Sinha specialised in nuclear physics, high energy physics, quark–gluon plasma and early universe cosmology. He is credited with helping India achieve recognition in the global science community. He contributed to making India join the search for the Higgs boson at CERN, helping the search that lasted from 2008 to 2012, which eventually culminated with the discovery of the Higgs boson. At CERN he also worked in creating and researching quark–gluon plasma alongside searching for the Higgs Boson. Sinha additionally led his team to do experiments at the Relativistic Heavy Ion Collider at the Brookhaven National Laboratory in the US and the Facility for Antiproton and Ion Research in Germany.

Sinha was the chairman of board of governors, National Institute of Technology, Durgapur (NIT Duragpur). He was nominated as a member of the Scientific Advisory Council to the Prime Minister from 27 January 2005. He has been re-elected for the second time as a member of the Scientific Advisory Council to the Prime Minister from December 2009.

Sinha died on 11 August 2023, at the age of 78, in Kolkata.

== Awards and honours ==
Sinha was the recipient of S.N. Bose Birth Centenary Award of the Indian Science Congress Association in 1994. He was awarded D.A.E. – Dr. Raja Ramanna Prize 2001 and delivered the Pandya Endowment lecture Award, IPA, 2001 and Rais Ahmed Memorial Lecture Award, Aligarh, 2001.

Sinha was a member of the Visva-Bharati University's Academic Council. He became the Fellow of the 3rd World Academy of Sciences, Italy, 2002 and Indian Academy of Sciences, Bangalore, 2004. He was elected to the fellowship of the Institute of Physics, UK. Bikash Sinha was the Vice-chancellor of West Bengal University of Technology from February 2003 to 18 December 2003 and also a member of the Scientific Advisory Committee to the Cabinet, Govt. of India in 2005. Sinha was awarded the R.D. Birla Award for Excellence in Physics in 2002.

The Ministry of Human Resource Development appointed Sinha as the Chairman of the Local Committee of the Indian Institute of Science Education and Research, Kolkata, in June 2005. He was awarded the Humboldt Research Award by the Alexander von Humboldt Foundation, Germany, in November 2005. He was awarded Meghnad Saha Memorial Lecture Award (2007) from The National Academy of Sciences, India, on 28 August 2007 and he was elected as President of the Indian Physics Association in November 2007. Sinha was elected as Fellow of the Institute of Physics, London, in 2009.

Sinha was conferred the Padma Bhushan Award in 2010 for his significant contribution in science and technology. He also received the Padma Shri in 2001. He was made a fellow of the Indian National Science Academy due to his research in Physics (1989). He was also a Fellow of National Academy of Sciences, Allahabad (1993) and the Indian Academy of Sciences, Bangalore (2004). He was also awarded an Honorary Doctorate from Netaji Subhas Open University in 2013, and National Institute of Technology Agartala in 2013.
