= Apurba Sarkar =

Indian politician

Apurba Sarkar (David)

Member of the West Bengal Legislative Assembly
- In office 2 May 2021 – 7 May 2026; 2006–2019
- Preceded by: Atish Chandra Sinha, Safiul Alam Khan
- Succeeded by: Safiul Alam Khan; Gargi Das Ghosh
- Constituency: Kandi

Chairman of North Bengal State Transport Corporation
- In office 30 May 2019 – 2021

Chairman of Kandi Municipality
- In office 2015–2022

President of Murshidabad District Central Co operative Bank
- Incumbent
- Assumed office 2019

President of Murshidabad District ICDS
- Incumbent
- Assumed office 2019

President of Trinamool Congress Murshidabad District
- Incumbent
- Assumed office 13 November 2023

Personal details
- Born: 4 January 1964 (age 62) Kandi, West Bengal, India
- Party: Trinamool Congress
- Other political affiliations: Indian National Congress
- Profession: Politician, businessman, Social Influencer

Apurba Sarkar is an Indian politician. He was elected to the West Bengal Legislative Assembly from Kandi constituency in the 2011 West Bengal Legislative Assembly elections. He is ex President of NBSTC North Bengal State Transport Corporation.
