= Sukhen Kumar Bagdi =

Indian politician (born 1966)

Member of the West Bengal Legislative Assembly
- Incumbent
- Assumed office 4 May 2026
- Preceded by: Jiban Krishna Saha
- Constituency: Burwan (SC)

Personal details
- Born: 1966 (age 59–60)
- Party: Bharatiya Janata Party
- Profession: Politician

Sukhen Kumar Bagdi (born 1966) is an Indian politician from West Bengal. He is a member of the West Bengal Legislative Assembly from Burwan (SC) representing the Bharatiya Janata Party.

== Early life and education ==
Bagdi was born to Muktipada Bagdi. He works as a carpenter, while his spouse is a homemaker. He passed Madhyamik examination through the West Bengal Council of Rabindra Open Schooling from C. F. Memorial School.

== Political career ==
Bagdi won the Burwan (SC) seat in the 2026 West Bengal Legislative Assembly election as a candidate of the Bharatiya Janata Party. He received 91,661 votes and defeated Protima Rajak of the All India Trinamool Congress by a margin of 22,300 votes.
