= Dilip Saha =

Indian politician (born 1962)

Member of the West Bengal Legislative Assembly
- Incumbent
- Assumed office 4 May 2026
- Preceded by: Kanai Chandra Mondal
- Constituency: Nabagram

Personal details
- Born: 1962 (age 63–64)
- Party: Bharatiya Janata Party
- Profession: Politician

Dilip Saha (born 1962) is an Indian politician from West Bengal. He is a member of the West Bengal Legislative Assembly from Nabagram (SC) representing the Bharatiya Janata Party.

== Early life and education ==
Saha was born to Krishna Pada Saha. He is engaged in business activities, while his spouse is also involved in business. He studied at Nischintapur High School, Berhampore, and completed Class IX in 1978.

== Political career ==
Saha won the Nabagram (SC) seat in the 2026 West Bengal Legislative Assembly election as a candidate of the Bharatiya Janata Party. He received 78,739 votes and defeated Pronab Chandra Das of the All India Trinamool Congress by a margin of 5,919 votes.
