= Subrata Saha =

Indian politician (1953–2022)

Subrata Kumar Saha

Minister of State for Public Works Government of West Bengal
- In office 20 May 2011 – 24 May 2014
- Governor: M.K. Narayanan
- Preceded by: Parikshit Let of CPI(M)
- Succeeded by: Bayron Biswas of INC
- Constituency: Sagardhighi

Minister of State (Independent Charge) for Food processing industry and Horticulture Government of West Bengal
- In office 10 May 2021 – 29 December 2022
- Governor: Jagdeep Dhankhar; La. Ganesan; C. V. Ananda Bose

Member of the West Bengal Legislative Assembly
- In office 13 May 2011 – 29 December 2022
- Constituency: Sagardighi

Personal details
- Born: 5 December 1953
- Died: 29 December 2022 (aged 69) Murshidabad, West Bengal, India
- Party: All India Trinamool Congress
- Other political affiliations: Indian National Congress
- Children: 1

Subrata Saha (5 December 1953 – 29 December 2022) was an eminent Indian politician who served as Minister without portfolio and as Minister of State for Public Works in the Government of West Bengal. He was also a MLA, elected from the Sagardighi constituency in the 2011 West Bengal state assembly election.

Subrata Saha was divested of his portfolio and retained as minister without portfolio in May 2014.

Saha was a law graduate and a businessman. He died from complications from gallbladder surgery on 29 December 2022, at the age of 69.
