= Sakharav Sarkar =

Member of the West Bengal Legislative Assembly

Member of the West Bengal Legislative Assembly
- Incumbent
- Assumed office 28 October 2026
- Preceded by: Humayun Kabir
- Constituency: Rejinagar

Personal details
- Born: 1980 (age 45–46)
- Party: Bharatiya Janata Party
- Profession: Politician

Sakharav Sarkar is an Indian politician who is serving as a Member of the West Bengal Legislative Assembly since 28 October 2026.

== Political career ==
On 15 September 2026, Sarkar was announced as the candidate for the by- election in Rejinagar from Bharatiya Janata Party. On 9 October 2026, it was announced that Sarkar had won the constituency, defeating Aam Janata Unnayan Party's Golam Nabi Azad by 75,816 votes.

== Electoral History ==
Electoral History of Sakharav Sarkar
Year	Constituency	Votes	%	Opponent	Party	Votes	%	Outcome	Margin of votes	Margin of Percentage
2026^	Rejinagar	129,914	63.14	Golam Nabi Azad	AJUP	54,098	26.29	Won	75,816	36.85

== Posts held ==
No.	Post		Tenure	Tenure length	Party
1	Member of the West Bengal Legislative Assembly, Rejinagar	MLA	28 October 2026 – Incumbent	13 days	BJP

== See also ==
- 2026 West Bengal Legislative Assembly election
- List of chief ministers of West Bengal
- West Bengal Legislative Assembly
