= Bharatpur, West Bengal Assembly constituency =

Bharatpur
- Constituency No. 69 for the West Bengal Legislative Assembly
- Interactive Map Outlining Bharatpur Assembly Constituency

Constituency details
- Country: India
- Region: East India
- State: West Bengal
- District: Murshidabad
- Lok Sabha constituency: Baharampur
- Established: 1951
- Total electors: 243,603
- Reservation: None

Member of Legislative Assembly
- 18th West Bengal Legislative Assembly
- Incumbent Mustafijur Rahaman
- Party: DTC
- Alliance: DTC+
- Elected year: 2026

Bharatpur Assembly constituency is an assembly constituency in Murshidabad district in the Indian state of West Bengal.

== Overview ==
As per orders of the Delimitation Commission, No. 69 Bharatpur Assembly constituency covers Bharatpur II community development block, and Alugram, Amlai, Bharatpur, Sijgram and Talgram gram panchayats of Bharatpur I community development block.

Bharatpur Assembly constituency is part of No. 10 Baharampur Lok Sabha constituency.

== Members of the Legislative Assembly ==
Year	Member	Party
1951	Bijoyendu Narayan Roy	Indian National Congress
1957	Goalbadan Trivedi	Indian National Congress
1962	Shambhu Gopal Das	Revolutionary Socialist Party
1967	S. Sinha	Indian National Congress
1969	Satyapada Bhattachayya	Indian National Congress
1971	Khondekor Md Nure Ahasan	Communist Party of India (Marxist)
1972	Kumar Dipti Sengupta	Indian National Congress
1977	Satyapada Bhattachatyya	Revolutionary Socialist Party
1982	Satyapada Bhattachatyya	Revolutionary Socialist Party
1987	Satyapada Bhattachatyya	Revolutionary Socialist Party
1991	Id Mohammad	Revolutionary Socialist Party
1996	Id Mohammad	Revolutionary Socialist Party
2001	Id Mohammad	Revolutionary Socialist Party
2006	Id Mohammad	Revolutionary Socialist Party
2011	Id Mohammad	Revolutionary Socialist Party
2016	Kamalesh Chatterjee	Indian National Congress
2021	Humayun Kabir	Trinamool Congress
2021	Humayun Kabir	Aam Janata Unnayan Party (Note: Suspended from AITC and subsequently formed AJUP after suspension.)
2026	Mustafijur Rahaman	Trinamool Congress

== Election results ==
Vote share of Winning candidates
2026	42.38%
2021	50.90%
2016	36.18%
2011	47.78%
2006	49.55%
2001	47.51%
1996	53.38%
1991	54.71%
1987	48.21%
1982	51.64%
1977	51.65%
1972	55.93%
1971	35.37%
1969	43.57%
1967	31.85%
1962	47.35%
1957	52.50%
1951	33.65%

=== 2026 ===
2026 West Bengal Legislative Assembly election: Bharatpur
Party	Candidate	Votes	%	±%
AITC	Mustafijur Rahaman	90,870	42.38	▼8.52
BJP	Anamika Ghosh	60,117	28.04	▼0.07
INC	Azheruddin Mohammad	51,321	23.93	▲8.0
RSP	Nowfal Mohammad Safiulla	3,604	1.68	
Independent	Anowar Hossain Molla	2,204	1.03	
NOTA	None of the above	1,620	0.76	▼0.53
Majority		30,753	14.34	▼8.45
Turnout		214,424	89.17	▲11.57
AITC hold		Swing		

=== 2021 ===
2021 West Bengal Legislative Assembly election: Bharatpur
Party	Candidate	Votes	%	±%
AITC	Humayun Kabir	96,226	50.9	▲21.39
BJP	Iman Kalyan Mukherjee	53,143	28.11	▲22.02
INC	Kamalesh Chatterjee	30,116	15.93	▼20.25
AMB	Badan Ghosh	2,581	1.37	▲0.55
AIMIM	Sajjad Hossain	2,076	1.1	
NOTA	None of the above	2,444	1.29	
Majority		43,083	22.79	
Turnout		189,047	77.6	
AITC gain from INC		Swing		

=== 2016 ===
2016 West Bengal Legislative Assembly election: Bharatpur
Party	Candidate	Votes	%	±%
INC	Kamalesh Chatterjee	59,789	36.18	▼10.3
AITC	Khadem Dastagir	48,772	29.51	New entry
RSP	Id Mohammad	39,949	24.17	▼23.61
BJP	Iman Kalyan Mukherjee	10,064	6.09	▲3.9
NOTA	None of the above	3,837	2.32	New entry
SP	Humayun Kabir	1,497	0.91	New entry
AMB	Badan Ghosh	1,355	0.82	New entry
Majority		11,017	6.67	▲5.37
Turnout		1,65,263	76.56	▼4.92
INC gain from RSP		Swing		

=== 2011 ===
2011 West Bengal Legislative Assembly election: Bharatpur
Party	Candidate	Votes	%	±%
RSP	Id Mohammad	70,658	47.78	
INC	Daliya Begum	68,729	46.48	
IND	Somnath Goswami (Note: Somnath Goswami, contesting as an independent, was a Congress rebel.)	3,711	2.51	
BJP	Madhusudan Saha	3,243	2.19	
IND	Ranjit Konai	1,534	1.04	
Majority		1,929	1.30	
Turnout		1,47,875	81.42	
RSP hold		Swing		

=== 2006 ===
2006 West Bengal Legislative Assembly election: Bharatpur
Party	Candidate	Votes	%	±%
RSP	Id Mohammad	63,621	49.55	
INC	Afzal Hossain Khan (Sunju)	56,289	43.84	
IND	Debasish Chatterjee	3,423	2.67	
AITC	Biswajit Ghosh	3,263	2.54	
IND	Golam Akbar	949	0.74	
SP	Mokaddim Shaikh	862	0.67	
Majority		7,332	5.71	
Turnout		128,407		
RSP hold		Swing		

=== 2001 ===
2001 West Bengal Legislative Assembly election: Bharatpur
Party	Candidate	Votes	%	±%
RSP	Id. Mohammad	55,667	47.51	
IND	Debasish Chatterjee	49,955	42.63	
AITC	Kanchanlal Mukherjee	5,040	4.30	
NCP	Ahamed Salauddin	3,414	2.91	
IND	Id. Mahammad Sk.	3,103	2.65	
Majority		5,712	4.88	
Turnout		117,252	74.50	
RSP hold		Swing		

=== 1996 ===
1996 West Bengal Legislative Assembly election: Bharatpur
Party	Candidate	Votes	%	±%
RSP	Id Mahammad	58,266	53.38	
INC	Satya Narayan Banerjee	43,960	40.27	
BJP	Haradhan Chakraborty	5,938	5.44	
IND	Nurul Huda	728	0.67	
IND	Rathin Bhattacharjee	267	0.24	
Majority		14,306	13.11	
Turnout		111,770	74.83	
RSP hold		Swing		

=== 1991 ===
1991 West Bengal Legislative Assembly election: Bharatpur
Party	Candidate	Votes	%	±%
RSP	Id. Mohammad	54,880	54.71	
INC	Abdul Malek	23,001	22.93	
BJP	Nimai Chand Ghosh	20,909	20.84	
IPF	Sarafuzz Aman (Rantu)	948	0.95	
JP	Srikumar Mondal	579	0.58	
Majority		31,879	31.78	
Turnout		102,777	73.09	
RSP hold		Swing		

=== 1987 ===
1987 West Bengal Legislative Assembly election: Bharatpur
Party	Candidate	Votes	%	±%
RSP	Satya Pada Bhattacharyya	41,134	48.21	
INC	Khairul Khondakar	22,126	25.93	
IND	Abdul Mannan	14,639	17.16	
BJP	Praphulla Kumar Banerjee	2,227	2.61	
IUML	Sk. Sahajuddin	1,511	1.77	
IND	Radha Mohan Dey	1,284	1.50	
IND	Bairabendra Narayan	1,040	1.22	
IND	Jitendranath Roy	667	0.78	
LKD	Jahangir Hossain	471	0.55	
IND	Dulal Chandra Gosh	220	0.26	
Majority		19,008	22.28	
Turnout		86,681	67.62	
RSP hold		Swing		

=== 1982 ===
1982 West Bengal Legislative Assembly election: Bharatpur
Party	Candidate	Votes	%	±%
RSP	Satyapada Bhattacharya	38,169	51.64	
INC	Abdul Mannan	34,575	46.78	
LKD	Jahangir Hossain	1,163	1.57	
Majority		3,594	4.86	
Turnout		75,326	73.52	
RSP hold		Swing		

=== 1977 ===
1977 West Bengal Legislative Assembly election: Bharatpur
Party	Candidate	Votes	%	±%
RSP	Satyapada Bhattacharyya	20,743	51.65	
IND	Abdul Mannan	7,542	18.78	
INC	Tarun Kumar Banerjee	4,559	11.35	
IND	K. K. Siddique	3,309	8.24	
JP	Abhoy Pada Saha	3,097	7.71	
IUML	Kho. Luthfor Rahaman	493	1.23	
IND	Hiralal Das	418	1.04	
Majority		13,201	32.87	
Turnout		40,874	46.12	
Swing to RSP from INC		Swing		

=== 1972 ===
1972 West Bengal Legislative Assembly election: Bharatpur
Party	Candidate	Votes	%	±%
INC	Kumar Dipti Sen Gupta	23,320	55.93	
CPI(M)	Kh. Md. Nure Ahasan	17,824	42.75	
IUML	Sk Abu Talib	398	0.95	
RSM (Note: Revolutionary Socialist Party of India (Marxist Leninist))	Kalyan Chattopadhyay	154	0.37	
Majority		5,496	13.18	
Turnout		42,839	53.98	
Swing to INC from CPI(M)		Swing		

=== 1971 ===
1971 West Bengal Legislative Assembly election: Bharatpur
Party	Candidate	Votes	%	±%
CPI(M)	Khondekor Md Nure Ahasan	13,714	35.37	
INC	Kumar Jagadish Chandra Sinh	9,486	24.47	
RSP	Satya Pada Bhattacharyya	7,371	19.01	
IND	Khondekar Makaram Hosen	6,600	17.02	
Bangla Congress	Abdul Mannan	1,332	3.44	
INC(O)	Abhoy Pado Saha	267	0.69	
Majority		4,228	10.90	
Turnout		41,638	54.16	
Swing to CPI(M) from RSP		Swing		

=== 1969 ===
1969 West Bengal Legislative Assembly election: Bharatpur
Party	Candidate	Votes	%	±%
RSP	Satyapada Bhattacharyya	18,730	43.57	
INC	Bimalendu Narayan Roy	13,871	32.27	
IND	Choudhury Fazlul Ali	7,777	18.09	
LKD	Khondkar Nazrul Hoque	2,611	6.07	
Majority		4,859	11.30	
Turnout		44,278	60.36	
Swing to RSP from INC		Swing		

=== 1967 ===
1967 West Bengal Legislative Assembly election: Bharatpur
Party	Candidate	Votes	%	±%
INC	S. Sinha	11,771	31.85	
IND	S. P. Bhattacharyya	10,715	28.99	
IND	F. A. Choudhury	9,180	24.84	
IND	A. P. Saha	3,525	9.54	
IND	B. A. A. F. Choudhury	1,764	4.77	
Majority		1,056	2.86	
Turnout		41,124	56.34	
Swing to INC from RSP		Swing		

=== 1962 ===
1962 West Bengal Legislative Assembly election: Bharatpur
Party	Candidate	Votes	%	±%
RSP	Shambhu Gopal Das	18,118	47.35	
INC	Goalbadan Trivedi	11,286	29.50	
IND	Bijoyendu Narayan Roy	6,174	16.14	
IND	Choudhury Fazhul Ali	2,083	5.44	
SUCI	Bazley Akbar Sayed	603	1.58	
Majority		6,832	17.85	
Turnout		41,174	50.28	
Swing to RSP from INC		Swing		

=== 1957 ===
1957 West Bengal Legislative Assembly election: Bharatpur
Party	Candidate	Votes	%	±%
INC	Goalbadan Trivedi	22,425	52.50	
IND	Badrudduja Syeed	17,111	40.06	
IND	Saroj Kumar Roy Choudhury	3,175	7.43	
Majority		5,314	12.44	
Turnout		42,711	60.80	
INC hold		Swing		

=== 1951 ===
1951 West Bengal Legislative Assembly election: Bharatpur
Party	Candidate	Votes	%	±%
INC	Bijoyendu Narayan Roy	6,520	33.65	
IND	Saroj Kumar Roy Choudhury	4,025	20.77	
IND	Maqsudal Hossain	3,370	17.39	
IND	Badrul Alam Abul Fazal	2,353	12.14	
IND	Saktipada Ghose	1,544	7.97	
IND	Khondekar Nur-e-Ahsan	863	4.45	
IND	Nazrul Haque Mia	700	3.61	
Majority		2,495	12.88	
Turnout		19,375	38.29	
INC win (new seat)				
