= Ram Chatterjee =

Indian politician

Ram Chatterjee (27 May 1922 – 1986) was an Indian politician. He won the Tarakeswar constituency seat in the 1967, 1969, 1971, 1977 and 1982 elections.

== Before politics ==
Born on 27 May 1922 in Chinsurah, Chatterjee grew up amidst poverty. His father died during his school years, and he had to leave school before finishing Class VII. During a long period Chatterjee was unemployed. He lived in Chinsurah and Chandannagar. As of 1949 he was leading a gang of goondas in Chandannagar, running extortion and protection rackets. Chatterjee was unofficially protected by the Council of Administration of Chandannagar, a fact that allowed him to continue his operations.

== 1950 riots ==
Chatterjee was hired at the Eastern Railways. He was involved in the 1950 communal riots, and during the riots he started a grouping called 'Bhabani Dal' in Chandannagar. These were the largest incidents of communal violence in Chandannagar. Chatterjee was arrested on March 31, 1950, under the Preventive Detention Act. He was released after three weeks of custody. On September 1, 1951, he was again arrested under the Preventive Detention Act. He remained in detention until July 28, 1952.

== In Forward Bloc ==
Upon his release Chatterjee joined the Forward Bloc (Marxist Group). He was arrested in January 1953, and was released on June 22, 1953. Chatterjee belonged to the group of FB(MG) leaders that were expelled from the party after having supported the Communist Party of India candidate in the 1953 Calcutta South East by-election. Along with the other expellees, he formed the Marxist Forward Bloc in April the following year.

Chatterjee took part in the 1958 food movement. He was arrested on September 15, 1958, and was detained for a week.

== United Front ==
In 1969 Chatterjee was named Minister for Sports in the second United Front government formed in West Bengal. On June 22, 1969, Chatterjee charged into the exclusive Calcutta Swimming Club, an institution predominately serving Europeans, along with about a hundred Santhal tribals.

Chatterjee lost his assembly seat in the 1972 West Bengal Legislative Assembly election.

== Left Front ==
Chatterjee regained his Tarakeswar seat in the 1977 West Bengal Legislative Assembly election. Chatterjee was named Minister of State Home (Civil Defense) Department in the Left Front government formed in West Bengal in 1977.

Chatterjee died in 1986. His widow contested the Tarakeswar seat after his death. After Chatterjee's death his party suffered an internal feud and was severely weakened in its Hooghly District bastion. It would take another 10 years before the MFB had a minister in the West Bengal government.
