= 1977 West Bengal Legislative Assembly election =

Assembly Election of West Bengal, India

- 14 June 1977

All 294 seats in the West Bengal Legislative Assembly 148 seats needed for a majority
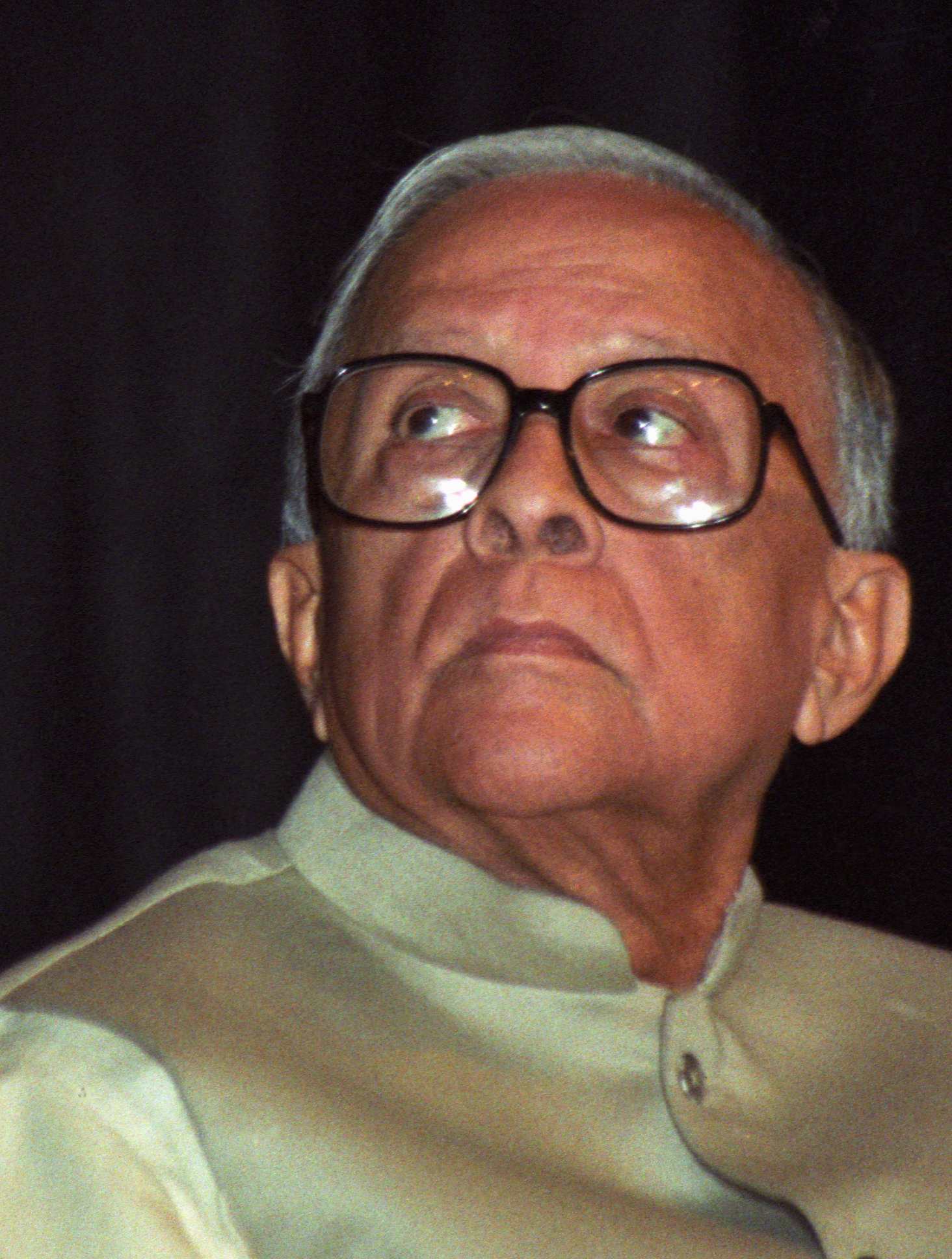

	Majority party	Minority party	Third party
Leader	Jyoti Basu	Prafulla Chandra Sen	Purabi Mukhopadhyay
Party	CPI(M)	JP	INC(R)
Alliance	LF
Leader since	1964	1977	1977
Leader's seat	Satgachhia	Did not contest (Note: Sen was the sitting MP for Arambagh.)	Did not contest (Note: Mukhopadhyay was a Rajya Sabha MP representing West Bengal.)
Last election	27.45%, 14 seats	New party	49.08%, 216 seats
Seats won	178	29	20
Seat change	▲164	New	▼196
Popular vote	6,568,999	2,869,391	3,298,063
Percentage	35.46%	20.02%	23.02%
Swing	▲8.01 pp	New	▼26.06 pp
Alliance seats	231	29	20
Seat change	New alliance	New	▼196
Chief Minister before election
Siddhartha Shankar Ray
INC
Chief Minister after election
Jyoti Basu
CPI(M)

Legislative Assembly elections was held in the Indian state of West Bengal on 14 June 1977. The polls took place after the ousting of Indira Gandhi's government at the Centre.

The Left Front won a landslide victory. The 1977 election marked the beginning of the 34-year Left Front rule in West Bengal, with Communist Party of India (Marxist) leader Jyoti Basu leading the first Left Front cabinet. The election finally put to rest, the decade-long political instability that had begun since 1967.

== Background ==
After the Janata Party won the national parliamentary election in March 1977 the new government in Delhi opted to dissolve the assemblies in nine states where the Indian National Congress (R) had lost the parliamentary polls and call for fresh elections. West Bengal was one of these states. The Congress(R) opposed the dissolution of the assemblies, the incumbent West Bengal Congress(R) government petitioned the Supreme Court of India. The Supreme Court rejected the petition on 30 April 1977 and the West Bengal assembly was dissolved on order from the acting president B.D. Jatti.

Ahead of the March 1977 parliamentary election the Left Front (a new alliance led by the CPI(M) consisting of RSP, AIFB, MFB, RCPI & Biplobi Bangla Congress) and the Janata Party had contested with a seat-sharing agreement. With the assembly elections approaching, the two sides sought to build a seat-sharing agreement. But the negotiation turned fruitless, and the Left Front and Janata Party parted ways. The Left Front had offered the Janata Party 56% of the seats and the post as Chief Minister to Janata Party leader Prafulla Chandra Sen, but the Janata Party insisted on 70% of the seats.

There were 25,984,474 eligible voters, voter turn-out stood at 56.15%.

== Campaign ==
In most areas the West Bengal assembly election saw a triangular contest between the Left Front, the Congress(R) and the Janata Party for the 294 seats across the constituency. The Left Front fielded 293 candidates; CPI(M) contested 224 seats, the All India Forward Bloc 36, the Revolutionary Socialist Party 23, the Marxist Forward Bloc 3, the Revolutionary Communist Party of India 4, the Biplobi Bangla Congress 2 and 1 Left Front supported independent. Congress(R) contested 290 seats and Janata Party 289 seats. Left Front heavily campaigned on the massive-rigging perpetrated by the Congress(R) in the previous state election, state-sponsored anti-Communist violence & Emergency-era abuses perpetrated by the government of Siddharta Shankar Ray, with its slogan being কংগ্রেসের কালো হাত ভেঙ্গে দাও, গুড়িয়ে দাও (Break off & smash the black hand of the Congress in Bengali).

== Seat Allotment ==
=== Left Front ===
Party	Flag	Symbol	Leader	Contesting Seats	
Communist Party of India (Marxist)			Jyoti Basu	224	227
Biplobi Bangla Congress				2	227
Independent				1	227
All India Forward Bloc			R. K. Haldulkar	36	
Revolutionary Socialist Party			Tridib Chaudhuri	23	
Revolutionary Communist Party of India			Bimalananda Mukherjee	4	
Marxist Forward Bloc			Pratim Chatterjee	3	
Total				293	

=== Indira Congress ===
Party	Flag	Symbol	Leader	Contesting Seats
Indian National Congress (R)			Purabi Mukhopadhyay	290
Total				290

=== Janata Party ===
Party	Flag	Symbol	Leader	Contesting Seats
Janata Party			Prafulla Chandra Sen	289
Total				289

== Results ==
The Left Front won the election, winning 231 out of the 294 seats. The electoral result came as a surprise to the Left Front itself, as it had offered 52% of the seats in the pre-electoral seat sharing talks with the Janata Party. On 21 June 1977 the Left Front formed a government with Jyoti Basu as its Chief Minister. The first cabinet meeting of the Left Front government ordered the release of political prisoners.

Provisional Central Committee, Communist Party of India (Marxist-Leninist) leader Santosh Rana was elected as an independent from Gopiballavpur.

Party		Candidates	Seats	Votes	%
Left Front	Communist Party of India (Marxist)	224	178	5,080,828	35.46
Left Front	All India Forward Bloc	36	25	750,229	5.24
Left Front	Revolutionary Socialist Party	23	20	536,625	3.74
Left Front	Revolutionary Communist Party of India	4	3	75,156	0.52
Left Front	Marxist Forward Bloc	3	3	58,466	0.41
Left Front	Biplobi Bangla Congress	2	1	35,457	0.25
Left Front	LF independent	1	1	32,238	0.22
Janata Party		289	29	2,869,391	20.02
Indian National Congress (R)		290	20	3,298,063	23.02
Communist Party of India		63	2	375,560	2.62
Socialist Unity Centre of India		29	4	211,752	1.48
Indian Union Muslim League		32	1	54,942	0.38
Workers Party of India		2	1	29,221	0.20
Jharkhand Party		2	0	5,701	0.04
Republican Party of India		3	0	1,652	0.01
All India Gorkha League		2	0	810	0.01
Bharater Biplobi Communist Party		1	0	489	0.00
Independents		566	7	912,612	6.37
Total		1,572	294	14,329,201	100
Source: ECI

== Elected members ==
Constituency		Winner				Runner Up				Margin	%
#	Name	Candidate	Party	Votes	%	Candidate	Party	Votes	%	Margin	%
1	Mekliganj (SC)	Sada Kant Roy	AIFB	21,339	45.30	Madhusudan Roy	INC	12,622	26.80	8,717	18.50
2	Sitalkuchi (SC)	Sudhir Pramanik	CPI(M)	23,696	56.38	Birendra Nath Roy	INC	10,092	24.01	13,604	32.37
3	Mathabhanga (SC)	Dinesh Chandra Dakua	CPI(M)	22,493	50.88	Pratap Singha	INC	8,758	19.81	13,735	31.07
4	Cooch Behar North	Aparajita Goppi	AIFB	32,792	63.07	Bimal Chandra Dhar	INC	8,592	16.53	24,200	46.54
5	Cooch Behar West	Bimal Kanti Basu	AIFB	33,595	66.18	Maqsudar Rahman	INC	11,427	22.51	22,168	43.67
6	Sitai	Dipak Sen Gupta	AIFB	33,405	62.38	Sushil Roy Sarkar	INC	12,544	23.42	20,861	38.96
7	Dinhata	Kamal Kanti Guha	AIFB	33,660	56.32	Alok Kumar Nandi	INC	12,443	20.82	21,217	35.50
8	Natabari	Sibendra Narayan Chowdhury	CPI(M)	26,300	51.67	Santosh Kumar Roy	INC	12,486	24.53	13,814	27.14
9	Tufanganj (SC)	Manindra Nath Barma	CPI(M)	28,572	59.09	Surendra Narayan Roy Kungar	JP	11,361	23.50	17,211	35.59
10	Kumargram (ST)	John Arther Baxla	RSP	22,882	53.75	Konda Bhagat	INC	15,543	36.51	7,339	17.24
11	Kalchini (ST)	Manohar Tirkey	RSP	21,119	57.53	Denish Lakra	INC	7,753	21.12	13,366	36.41
12	Alipurduars	Nani Bhattacharya	RSP	35,635	62.95	Narayan Bhattacharya	INC	12,163	21.49	23,472	41.46
13	Falakata (SC)	Jogendra Nath Singh Roy	CPI(M)	20,520	45.22	Gajendra Nath Barman	INC	12,707	28.00	7,813	17.22
14	Madarihat (ST)	A. H. Besterwitch	RSP	18,037	50.14	Dhirendra Narjinary	INC	10,299	28.63	7,738	21.51
15	Dhupguri (SC)	Banamali Roy	CPI(M)	10,870	30.37	Jagadananda Roy	INC	8,894	24.85	1,976	5.52
16	Nagrakata (ST)	Punai Oraon	CPI(M)	21,408	48.48	Hemraj Bhagat	INC	10,510	23.80	10,898	24.68
17	Mainaguri (SC)	Tarak Bandhu Roy	RSP	14,376	35.97	Bhabendra Nath Roy Hakim	JP	11,017	27.57	3,359	8.40
18	Mal (ST)	Mohan Lal Oraon	CPI(M)	17,099	42.97	Antani Topno	INC	9,314	23.40	7,785	19.57
19	Kranti	Parimal Mitra	CPI(M)	13,940	33.79	Abdul Hasnat Md. Abu Saleque	INC	11,865	28.76	2,075	5.03
20	Jalpaiguri	Nirmal Kumar Bose	AIFB	16,949	38.46	Devendra Mohan Sarkar	JP	10,607	24.07	6,342	14.39
21	Rajganj (SC)	Dhirendra Nath Roy	CPI(M)	19,195	49.81	Monomohan Roy	JP	11,866	30.79	7,329	19.02
22	Kalimpong	Subha Renuleena	IND	13,983	42.68	Gurung Gajendra	INC	9,045	27.61	4,938	15.07
23	Darjeeling	Deo Prakash Rai	IND	12,607	31.75	Sangdopal Lepcha	CPI(M)	8,414	21.19	4,193	10.56
24	Kurseong	Dawa Norbula	INC	11,941	27.57	Anand Pathak	CPI(M)	10,390	23.99	1,551	3.58
25	Siliguri	Biren Bose	CPI(M)	25,094	45.97	Arun Kumar Moitra	INC	15,590	28.56	9,504	17.41
26	Phansidewa (ST)	Patras Minz	CPI(M)	20,819	41.90	Chacko Taresa Soreng	JP	13,354	26.87	7,465	15.03
27	Chopra	Moha Bachcha Munsi	CPI(M)	16,188	42.37	Narayan Chandra Sinha	IND	7,319	19.16	8,869	23.21
28	Islampur	Abdul Karim Ch.	IND	16,072	42.37	Goutam Gupta	IND	6,755	17.81	9,317	24.56
29	Goalpokhar	Ramjan Ali	IND	14,363	38.44	Puran Chand Meheswari	IND	3,667	9.81	10,696	28.63
30	Karandighi	Haji Sajjad Hussain	INC	14,041	37.34	Amaren Iranath Sinha	JP	10,402	27.67	3,639	9.67
31	Raiganj (SC)	Khagendra Nath Sinha	CPI(M)	19,264	42.80	Mehendranath Barman	JP	13,432	29.84	5,832	12.96
32	Kaliaganj (SC)	Naba Kumar Roy	INC	15,777	39.08	Nani Gopal Roy	CPI(M)	15,227	37.72	550	1.36
33	Kushmandi (SC)	Dhirendra Nath Sarkar	INC	17,915	44.20	Jogendra Nath Roy	RSP	14,908	36.78	3,007	7.42
34	Itahar	Zaimal Abedin	INC	26,747	51.85	Salil Kumar Guha	CPI(M)	16,384	31.76	10,363	20.09
35	Gangarampur	Ahindra Sarkar	CPI(M)	18,623	35.67	Moslehuddin Ahmed	INC	15,548	29.78	3,075	5.89
36	Tapan (ST)	Natheniel Murmu	RSP	32,660	62.83	Sebastiam Tudu	INC	13,258	25.50	19,402	37.33
37	Kumarganj	Jamini Kisore Mojumdar	CPI(M)	25,123	41.99	Khalil Sayed	INC	19,912	33.28	5,211	8.71
38	Balurghat	Biswanath Choudhauri	RSP	29,292	53.21	Jyotiswar Sarkar	INC	13,203	23.98	16,089	29.23
39	Habibpur (ST)	Murmu Sarkar	CPI(M)	16,509	45.18	Bobila Murmu	JP	8,241	22.56	8,268	22.62
40	Gajol (ST)	Sufal Murmu	CPI(M)	20,526	52.55	Shyam Murmu	JP	12,056	30.87	8,470	21.68
41	Kharba	Golam Yazdani	IND	24,564	44.61	Mahabubul Haque	INC	14,779	26.84	9,785	17.77
42	Harishchandrapur	Birendra Kumar Maitra	JP	24,883	44.89	Mohammad Elias Razi	WPI	22,194	40.04	2,689	4.85
43	Ratua	Mohammad Ali	CPI(M)	17,648	45.31	Niren Chandra Sinha	INC	13,808	35.45	3,840	9.86
44	Araidanga	Habib Mustafa	CPI(M)	19,070	47.15	Md. Gofurur Rahaman	INC	17,473	43.20	1,597	3.95
45	Malda (SC)	Subhendu Choudhury	CPI(M)	14,893	39.51	Balaram Saha	JP	8,179	21.70	6,714	17.81
46	Englishbazar	Sailen Sarkar	CPI(M)	13,851	31.56	Hari Prasanna Misra	JP	13,601	30.99	250	0.57
47	Manikchak	Subodh Choudhury	CPI(M)	16,414	36.25	Jckhilal Mondal	INC	16,280	35.95	134	0.30
48	Suzapur	A. B. A. Ghani Khan Ch.	INC	43,569	75.22	Habibur	CPI(M)	9,821	16.96	33,748	58.26
49	Kaliachak	Samsuddin Ahmmad	INC	29,069	45.23	Promode Ranjan Basu	JP	28,423	44.22	646	1.01
50	Farakka	Abul Hasnat Khan	CPI(M)	14,836	36.77	Jerar Ali	IND	11,242	27.86	3,594	8.91
51	Aurangabad	Lutfal Haque	INC	22,675	45.75	Sohidul Alam	CPI(M)	17,361	35.03	5,314	10.72
52	Suti	Md. Sohorab	INC	18,442	33.65	Shish Mohammad	RSP	16,304	29.75	2,138	3.90
53	Sagardighi (SC)	Hazari Biswas	CPI(M)	11,394	35.56	Atul Chandra Sarkar	INC	10,477	32.70	917	2.86
54	Jangipur	Habibur Rahaman	INC	21,395	42.14	Achintya Singha	SUCI	11,850	23.34	9,545	18.80
55	Lalgola	Abdus Sattar	INC	31,144	58.99	Zainal Aabedin	CPI(M)	9,929	18.81	21,215	40.18
56	Bhagabangola	Kazi Hafizur Rahaman	IND	14,266	32.18	Sk. Kazimuddin Ahmad	CPI(M)	10,245	23.11	4,021	9.07
57	Nabagram	Birendra Narayan Ray	CPI(M)	29,951	57.11	Durgapada Sinha	JP	13,659	26.04	16,292	31.07
58	Murshidabad	Chhaya Ghosh	AIFB	17,524	37.01	Syed Nawab Jani Meerza	JP	12,960	27.37	4,564	9.64
59	Jalangi	Atahar Rahaman	CPI(M)	25,159	42.65	Ranjit Kumar Haldar	IND	15,898	26.95	9,261	15.70
60	Domkal	Md. Abdul Bari	CPI(M)	33,084	57.03	Ekramul Haque Biswas	INC	18,240	31.44	14,844	25.59
61	Naoda	Jayanta Kumar Biswas	RSP	33,096	51.08	Nasiruddin Khan	INC	20,399	31.48	12,697	19.60
62	Hariharpara	Shaikh Imajuddin	INC	14,964	27.07	Abu Raihan Biswas	SUCI	13,267	24.00	1,697	3.07
63	Berhampore	Debabrata Bandopadhyay	RSP	34,843	61.35	Subrata Saha	INC	14,876	26.19	19,967	35.16
64	Beldanga	Timir Baran Bhadury	RSP	31,320	46.34	Nurul Islam Chowdhury	INC	19,536	28.91	11,784	17.43
65	Kandi	Atish Chandra Sinha	INC	24,518	42.19	Jagadish Sinha	JP	17,728	30.51	6,790	11.68
66	Khargram (SC)	Dinabandhu Majhi	CPI(M)	23,298	51.06	Harendra Nath Halder	INC	11,056	24.23	12,242	26.83
67	Barwan	Amalendra Roy	RSP	23,004	56.43	Sunil Mohan Ghosh Moulik	INC	8,221	20.17	14,783	36.26
68	Bharatpur	Satyapada Bhattacharyya	RSP	20,743	51.65	Abdul Mannan	IND	7,542	18.78	13,201	32.87
69	Karimpur	Samarendra Nath Sanyal	CPI(M)	23,905	43.36	Arabindra Mandal	INC	12,147	22.03	11,758	21.33
70	Palashipara	Madhabendu Mohanta	CPI(M)	25,912	43.71	Kartic Chandra Biswas	INC	12,151	20.50	13,761	23.21
71	Nakashipara	Mir Fakir Mohammad	CPI(M)	17,645	39.87	S. M. Badaruddin	JP	6,921	15.64	10,724	24.23
72	Kaliganj	Debsaran Ghosh	RSP	21,851	41.16	S. M. Fazlur Rahman	JP	18,729	35.28	3,122	5.88
73	Chapra	Sahabuddin Mondal	CPI(M)	33,207	60.46	Kazi Safluddin	JP	13,678	24.91	19,529	35.55
74	Krishnaganj (SC)	Jnanendranath Biswas	CPI(M)	23,635	53.40	Amulya Kumar Biswas	JP	13,131	29.67	10,504	23.73
75	Krishnagar East	Kashikanta Maitra	JP	20,649	43.10	Sadhan Chttopadhdyay	CPI(M)	20,445	42.68	204	0.42
76	Krishnagar West	Amritendu Mukherjee	CPI(M)	26,311	60.02	Mohadeb Bhattacharya	JP	7,140	16.29	19,171	43.73
77	Nabadwip	Debi Prosad Basu	CPI(M)	27,818	50.72	Sasthi Bhusan Pal	INC	16,644	30.35	11,174	20.37
78	Santipur	Bimalananda Mukherjee	RCPI	28,553	55.72	Jnanendra Nath Pramanik	JP	14,371	28.04	14,182	27.68
79	Hanskhali (SC)	Sukumar Mondal	CPI(M)	25,861	44.83	Ananda Mohan Biswas	INC	20,060	34.77	5,801	10.06
80	Ranaghat East (SC)	Satish Chandra Biswas	CPI(M)	28,786	48.98	Sushil Kumar Ray	INC	16,133	27.45	12,653	21.53
81	Ranaghat West	Kundu Gourchandra	CPI(M)	33,546	56.67	Naresh Chandra Chaki	INC	13,713	23.16	19,833	33.51
82	Chakdaha	Binoy Kumar Biswas	IND	32,238	54.52	Saradindu Biswas	INC	11,895	20.12	20,343	34.40
83	Haringhata	Malakar Nanigopal	CPI(M)	28,652	50.03	Manas Kumar Ganguly	INC	16,698	29.16	11,954	20.87
84	Bagdaha (SC)	Kamalakshmi Biswas	AIFB	25,049	44.85	Apurba Lal Majumdar	IND	24,966	44.70	83	0.15
85	Bongaon	Ranjit Mitra	CPI(M)	27,820	47.15	Bhupendra Nath Seth	INC	18,619	31.55	9,201	15.60
86	Gaighata	Kanti Chandra Biswas	CPI(M)	32,620	49.21	Radha Pada Biswas	INC	24,562	37.05	8,058	12.16
87	Habra	Nirode Roy Chowdhury	CPI(M)	29,676	54.03	Krishnadas Chattopadhyay	INC	17,062	31.06	12,614	22.97
88	Ashokenagar	Nani Kar	CPI(M)	33,702	58.09	Keshab Chandra Bhattacharjee	IND	19,887	34.28	13,815	23.81
89	Amdanga	Hashim Abdul Halim	CPI(M)	27,189	51.84	Mira Dutta	JP	11,435	21.80	15,754	30.04
90	Barasat	Saral Deb	AIFB	31,444	55.93	Kanti Ranjan Chatopadhyaya	INC	11,465	20.39	19,979	35.54
91	Rajarhat (SC)	Rabindra Nath Mandal	CPI(M)	28,495	55.04	Amalendu Sekhar Naskar	INC	12,126	23.42	16,369	31.62
92	Deganga	A. K. M. Hassan Uzzaman	IUML	23,589	51.80	Md. Yakub	AIFB	11,230	24.66	12,359	27.14
93	Swarupnagar	Anisur Rahman	CPI(M)	17,351	32.50	Chandra Nath Misra	INC	14,246	26.69	3,105	5.81
94	Baduria	Mostafa Bin Quasem	CPI(M)	25,756	52.84	Zulfiquer Ali	INC	14,003	28.73	11,753	24.11
95	Basirhat	Narayan Mukherjee	CPI(M)	26,447	46.77	Debi Prasad Nanda	INC	12,312	21.77	14,135	25.00
96	Hasnabad	Amiya Banerjee	CPI(M)	15,188	35.94	Molla Tasmatulla	INC	11,642	27.55	3,546	8.39
97	Haroa (SC)	Kshiti Ranjan Mondal	CPI(M)	24,310	58.52	Brajendra Nath Sarkar	JP	8,520	20.51	15,790	38.01
98	Sandeshkhali (SC)	Kumud Ranjan Biswas	CPI(M)	32,907	60.61	Ramajit Kumar Das	INC	11,260	20.74	21,647	39.87
99	Hingalganj (SC)	Sudhangshu Mondal	CPI(M)	23,475	43.93	Amal Krishna Mistri	JP	10,989	20.56	12,486	23.37
100	Gosaba (SC)	Ganesh Chandra Mondal	RSP	24,300	48.20	Paresh Baidya	INC	16,530	32.79	7,770	15.41
101	Basanti (SC)	Kalipada Barman	RSP	24,695	52.29	Chittaranjan Naskar	INC	11,765	24.91	12,930	27.38
102	Kultali (SC)	Probodh Purkait	SUCI	24,086	46.83	Anandi Tanti	JP	14,750	28.68	9,336	18.15
103	Joynagar	Deba Prosad Sarkar	SUCI	27,778	48.60	Jnantosh Chakraborti	JP	13,258	23.20	14,520	25.40
104	Baruipur	Hemen Majumdar	CPI(M)	31,689	57.94	Ram Kanta Mandal	INC	12,273	22.44	19,416	35.50
105	Canning West (SC)	Chitta Ranjan Mridha	CPI(M)	20,675	35.39	Gobinda Chandra Naslar	INC	16,010	27.40	4,665	7.99
106	Canning East	Abdur Razzak Molla	CPI(M)	24,580	58.88	Osman Gani	JP	11,976	28.69	12,604	30.19
107	Bhangar	Daud Khan	CPI(M)	14,680	34.29	Amir Ali Molla	JP	13,632	31.85	1,048	2.44
108	Jadavpur	Dinesh Majumdar	CPI(M)	35,762	64.86	Santimoy Chatterjee	JP	10,340	18.75	25,422	46.11
109	Sonarpur (SC)	Gangadhar Naskar	CPI(M)	36,138	68.73	Gourhari Sardar	INC	10,329	19.64	25,809	49.09
110	Bishnupur East (SC)	Sundar Naskar	CPI(M)	25,631	63.77	Ramkrishna Bar	INC	10,490	26.10	15,141	37.67
111	Bishnupur West	Provesh Chandra Ray	CPI(M)	34,620	62.72	Moaue Haque Shaik	INC	10,191	18.46	24,429	44.26
112	Behala East	Niranjan Mukherjee	CPI(M)	37,256	65.72	Indrajit Majumdar	INC	10,745	18.95	26,511	46.77
113	Behala West	Rabin Mukherjee	CPI(M)	37,053	62.63	Subodh Chandra Das	INC	14,600	24.68	22,453	37.95
114	Garden Reach	Chhedilal Singh	CPI(M)	22,719	48.06	S. M. Abdullah	INC	13,947	29.50	8,772	18.56
115	Maheshtala	Sudhir Bhandari	CPI(M)	27,256	60.68	Mali Safiuddin	JP	10,124	22.54	17,132	38.14
116	Budge Budge	Khitibhusan Burmon	CPI(M)	32,297	65.26	Bipulananda Guha Roy	INC	5,719	11.56	26,578	53.70
117	Satgachia	Jyoti Basu	CPI(M)	45,538	79.86	Jumman Ali Mollah	INC	7,092	12.44	38,446	67.42
118	Falta	Nemai Chandra Das	CPI(M)	32,298	64.40	Mohini Mohan Parui	INC	13,573	27.07	18,725	37.33
119	Diamond Harbour	Abdul Quiyom Molla	CPI(M)	36,584	60.03	Sankari Prasad Mondal	JP	19,241	31.57	17,343	28.46
120	Magrahat West	Chhobhan Gazi	CPI(M)	35,348	65.86	Sudhendu Mundle	INC	14,412	26.85	20,936	39.01
121	Magrahat East (SC)	Radjika Ranjan Pramanik	CPI(M)	35,349	60.79	Monoranjan Halder	INC	17,750	30.53	17,599	30.26
122	Mandirbazar (SC)	Renupada Halder	SUCI	19,151	34.95	Subhas Chandra Roy	CPI(M)	13,556	24.74	5,595	10.21
123	Mathurapur	Satya Ranjan Bapuli	INC	21,616	33.80	Robin Mondal	SUCI	17,940	28.05	3,676	5.75
124	Kulpi (SC)	Krishnadhan Halder	CPI(M)	21,844	44.99	Santosh Kumar Mondal	INC	14,360	29.58	7,484	15.41
125	Patharpratima	Gunadhar Maiti	CPI(M)	16,043	31.83	Ananta Kumar Bera	INC	12,656	25.11	3,387	6.72
126	Kakdwip	Hrishikesh Maity	CPI(M)	26,949	52.72	Basudeb Sautya	INC	12,362	24.18	14,587	28.54
127	Sagar	Provanjan Mondal	CPI(M)	26,159	48.55	Gobardhan Dingal	JP	12,419	23.05	13,740	25.50
128	Bijpur	Jagadish Chandra Das	CPI(M)	32,339	62.47	Jagadish Chandra Das	INC	12,079	23.33	20,260	39.14
129	Naihati	Gopal Basu	CPI(M)	34,293	61.87	Jagadish Chakraborty	INC	13,678	24.68	20,615	37.19
130	Bhatpara	Sita Ram Gupta	CPI(M)	33,105	63.39	Satya Narain Singh	INC	9,860	18.88	23,245	44.51
131	Jagatdal	Nihar Kumar Basu	AIFB	32,519	65.36	Sudhin Bhattacharjee	INC	11,221	22.55	21,298	42.81
132	Noapara	Jamini Bhusan Saha	CPI(M)	24,566	59.02	Apurba Bhattacharjee	INC	9,750	23.42	14,816	35.60
133	Titagarh	Mohammed Amin	CPI(M)	26,425	61.61	Ganga Prasad Sha	INC	13,137	30.63	13,288	30.98
134	Khardah	Kamal Sarkar	CPI(M)	32,769	62.18	Harshadhari Bhattacharyya	INC	6,997	13.28	25,772	48.90
135	Panihati	Gopal Krishna Bhattacharyya	CPI(M)	31,496	54.27	Sanmatha Nath Ghosh	JP	13,654	23.53	17,842	30.74
136	Kamarhati	Radhika Ranjan Banerjee	CPI(M)	38,746	65.20	Jayanta Chandra Sen	INC	10,850	18.26	27,896	46.94
137	Baranagar	Matish Ray	RSP	33,384	53.91	Kumud Bhattacharjee	INC	16,798	27.13	16,586	26.78
138	Dum Dum	Tarun Sen Gupta	CPI(M)	40,426	61.91	Lal Bahadur Singh	INC	12,387	18.97	28,039	42.94
139	Belgachia East	Subhas Chakraborty	CPI(M)	37,286	55.37	Samir Chatterjee	JP	16,433	24.40	20,853	30.97
140	Cossipur	Buddhadev Bhattacharjee	CPI(M)	19,360	42.99	Prafulla Kanti Ghosh	INC	13,384	29.72	5,976	13.27
141	Shyampukur	Nalini Kanta Guha	AIFB	16,651	41.46	Behoy Sircar	JP	12,083	30.08	4,568	11.38
142	Jorabagan	Haripada Bharati	JP	19,005	46.99	Hara Prasad Chatterjee	CPI(M)	11,085	27.41	7,920	19.58
143	Jorasanko	Vishnu Kant Shastri	JP	13,818	43.57	Deoki Nandan Poddar	INC	9,003	28.39	4,815	15.18
144	Bara Bazar	Rabi Shankar Pandey	JP	12,466	44.39	Ramkrishna Sarogi	INC	8,003	28.50	4,463	15.89
145	Bow Bazar	Abul Hasan	CPI(M)	13,996	38.54	Bijoy Krishna Dhandhania	JP	11,670	32.13	2,326	6.41
146	Chowringhee	Sandip Das	JP	14,166	38.78	Amal Datta	CPI(M)	11,995	32.83	2,171	5.95
147	Kabitirtha	Kalimuddin Shams	AIFB	28,311	51.70	Ram Pyare Ram	INC	15,403	28.13	12,908	23.57
148	Alipore	Ashoke Kumar Bose	CPI(M)	20,450	42.26	Salil Baran Chatterjee	JP	11,359	23.47	9,091	18.79
149	Rashbehari Avenue	Ashok Mitra	CPI(M)	20,699	39.64	Ashoke Kumar Mukhopadhyaya	JP	16,865	32.29	3,834	7.35
150	Tollygunge	Prasanta Kumar Sur	CPI(M)	26,911	49.43	Pankaj Kumar Banerjee	INC	17,455	32.06	9,456	17.37
151	Dhakuria	Jatin Chakravarty	RSP	32,029	48.92	Arabinda Prasad Das Gupta	INC	14,862	22.70	17,167	26.22
152	Ballygunge	Sachin Sen	CPI(M)	23,472	43.85	Subrata Mukherejee	INC	15,040	28.10	8,432	15.75
153	Entally	Md. Nezamuddin	CPI(M)	17,102	46.89	Biman Behari Mitra	JP	9,543	26.17	7,559	20.72
154	Taltola (SC)	Sumanta Kr. Hira	CPI(M)	18,114	47.49	Aradhendu Sekhar Naskar	INC	11,342	29.73	6,772	17.76
155	Beliaghata	Krishna Pada Ghosh	CPI(M)	29,201	55.82	Premananda Bose	JP	11,710	22.38	17,491	33.44
156	Sealdah	Binoy Banerjee	JP	13,300	36.89	Amar Prasad Chakaraborty	AIFB	11,140	30.90	2,160	5.99
157	Vidyasagar	Samar Kumar Rudra	CPI(M)	18,407	41.71	Tapan Kumar Sikdar	JP	14,259	32.31	4,148	9.40
158	Burtola	Nikhil Das	RSP	21,244	39.72	Ajit Kumar Panda	INC	16,583	31.01	4,661	8.71
159	Manicktola	Suhrid Mullick Chowdhury	CPI(M)	26,945	48.93	Ashok Das Gupta	JP	12,930	23.48	14,015	25.45
160	Belgachia West	Lakshmi Charan Sen	CPI(M)	23,954	45.11	Bhupendra Nath Sen Gupta	INC	14,717	27.72	9,237	17.39
161	Bally	Patipaban Pathak	CPI(M)	28,632	59.22	Ganesh Pathak	INC	12,353	25.55	16,279	33.67
162	Howrah North	Chitabrata Mazumdar	CPI(M)	27,552	48.50	Supriya Basu	INC	18,123	31.90	9,429	16.60
163	Howrah Central	Sudhindra Nath Kumar	IND	21,502	44.50	Sukumar Banerjee	JP	15,471	32.02	6,031	12.48
164	Howrah South	Praley Talukdar	CPI(M)	25,559	52.59	Ambika Prasad Banerjee	INC	12,552	25.83	13,007	26.76
165	Shibpur	Kanai Lal Bhattacharyya	AIFB	41,850	61.81	Mrigendra Mukherjee	INC	14,856	21.94	26,994	39.87
166	Domjur	Joykesh Mukherjee	CPI(M)	37,364	65.12	Krishna Pada Roy	INC	12,788	22.29	24,576	42.83
167	Jagatballavpur	M. Ansaruddin	CPI(M)	34,733	63.03	Brindaban Ghosh	INC	12,976	23.55	21,757	39.48
168	Panchla	Santosh Kumar Das	AIFB	30,255	49.22	Anwar Ali Sekh	INC	28,802	46.86	1,453	2.36
169	Sankrail (SC)	Haran Hazra	CPI(M)	33,650	61.20	Nityanandaa Bhuniya	JP	12,335	22.43	21,315	38.77
170	Uluberia North (SC)	Raj Kumar Mndal	CPI(M)	33,686	66.08	Arun Pramanik	JP	9,469	18.57	24,217	47.51
171	Uluberia South	Aurobinda Ghosal	AIFB	25,262	47.63	Abani Basu	IND	14,110	26.60	11,152	21.03
172	Shyampur	Sasabindu Bera	JP	21,723	36.31	Kishori Mohan Moinan	AIFB	21,309	35.62	414	0.69
173	Bagnan	Nirupama Chatterjee	CPI(M)	33,729	57.18	Sushanta Bhattacharya	INC	17,852	30.27	15,877	26.91
174	Kalyanpur	Nitai Charan Adak	CPI(M)	24,520	48.21	Arabinda Roy	JP	14,181	27.88	10,339	20.33
175	Amta	Barindra Nath Koley	CPI(M)	33,747	66.72	Aftabuddin Mondal	INC	10,527	20.81	23,220	45.91
176	Udaynarayanpur	Pannalal Majhi	CPI(M)	32,400	58.84	Saroj Karar	INC	18,137	32.94	14,263	25.90
177	Jangipara	Manindra Nath Jana	CPI(M)	32,738	61.38	Ganesh Chandraj Hatui	INC	13,099	24.56	19,639	36.82
178	Chanditala	Malin Ghosh	CPI(M)	37,243	70.67	Sekh Abdur Rahim	JP	9,520	18.07	27,723	52.60
179	Uttarpara	Santashree Chattopadhyay	CPI(M)	36,434	63.98	Kashinath Banerjee	JP	10,770	18.91	25,664	45.07
180	Serampore	Kamal Krishna Bahattacharayya	CPI(M)	32,732	52.31	Gopal Das Nag	INC	21,113	33.74	11,619	18.57
181	Champdani	Saidndra Nath Chattopadhyay	CPI(M)	35,111	63.58	Bibash Chandra Ghosh	JP	9,123	16.52	25,988	47.06
182	Chandernagore	Bhabani Mukherjee	CPI(M)	40,681	67.28	Asit Mukhopadhyay	INC	11,100	18.36	29,581	48.92
183	Singur	Gopal Bandnopadhyay	CPI(M)	29,358	50.10	Tarapada Sadhukhan	IND	13,541	23.11	15,817	26.99
184	Haripal	Balai Bandhopadhyay	CPI(M)	24,204	48.09	Chandrasekhar Banik	INC	10,371	20.61	13,833	27.48
185	Tarakeswar	Ram Chatterjee	IND	25,504	54.85	Ajit Bose Mullik	JP	12,999	27.95	12,505	26.90
186	Chinsurah	Sambhu Charan Ghosh	AIFB	28,632	61.77	Adhyapak Chandra Kumar Dey	INC	8,499	18.34	20,133	43.43
187	Bansberia	Prabir Kumar Sen Gupta	CPI(M)	30,719	61.40	Sanat Majumdar	JP	10,460	20.91	20,259	40.49
188	Balagarh (SC)	Abimnash Pramanik	CPI(M)	28,371	61.65	Gauranga Halder	INC	8,291	18.02	20,080	43.63
189	Pandua	Deb Narayan Chakrabarty	CPI(M)	32,804	61.57	Sailendra Chattopadhyay	INC	13,947	26.18	18,857	35.39
190	Polba	Brojogopal Neogy	CPI(M)	26,572	53.53	Bhabani Prosad Singha Roy	INC	13,070	26.33	13,502	27.20
191	Dhaniakhali (SC)	Kripa Sindhu Saha	AIFB	26,740	58.61	Kashinath Patra	INC	10,138	22.22	16,602	36.39
192	Pursurah	Manoranjan Hazra	CPI(M)	19,710	40.48	Durga Charan Chakrabarty	JP	19,494	40.03	216	0.45
193	Khanakul (SC)	Panchanan Digpati	JP	20,523	42.09	Sachindra Nath Hazra	CPI(M)	20,353	41.75	170	0.34
194	Arambagh	Ajoy Kr. Dey	JP	31,304	57.74	Madan Mohan Saha	CPI(M)	13,935	25.70	17,369	32.04
195	Goghat (SC)	Nanuram Roy	JP	20,642	45.64	Arati Biswas	AIFB	17,599	38.91	3,043	6.73
196	Chandrakona	Umapati Chakrabarty	CPI(M)	22,402	48.12	Jagannath Goswami	INC	8,919	19.16	13,483	28.96
197	Ghatal (SC)	Gopal Mondal	CPI(M)	21,937	53.99	Baneswar Saha	JP	13,681	33.67	8,256	20.32
198	Daspur	Prabhas Chandra Phadikar	CPI(M)	25,456	57.08	Bankim Chandra Sashmal	JP	11,319	25.38	14,137	31.70
199	Nandanpur	Manoranjan Roy	CPI(M)	17,024	38.66	Jagadish Ch. Majhi	JP	11,778	26.75	5,246	11.91
200	Panskura West	Sk. Omkar Ali	CPI	15,497	32.46	Jati Kumar Roy	JP	15,004	31.42	493	1.04
201	Panskura East	Swades Ranjan Maji	JP	15,231	33.37	Adhir Kumar Chatterjee	AIFB	10,788	23.64	4,443	9.73
202	Tamluk	Biswanath Mukhopadhyay	CPI	14,449	27.13	Sukumar Das	INC	14,333	26.91	116	0.22
203	Moyna	Pulak Bera	CPI(M)	19,054	34.71	Bhushan Ch. Dolai	INC	17,585	32.04	1,469	2.67
204	Mahishadal	Saswati Bag	JP	23,422	50.37	Dinabandhu Mandal	CPI(M)	9,213	19.81	14,209	30.56
205	Sutahata (SC)	Shiba Nath Das	JP	20,842	37.74	Lakshman Chandra Seth	CPI(M)	19,151	34.68	1,691	3.06
206	Nandigram	Prabir Jana	JP	26,388	44.62	Bhupal Chandra Panda	CPI	12,135	20.52	14,253	24.10
207	Narghat	Bankim Behari Maiti	JP	27,535	51.45	Saradindu Samanta	INC	16,503	30.84	11,032	20.61
208	Bhagabanpur	Haripada Jana	JP	24,318	49.96	Prasanta Kr. Pradhan	CPI(M)	15,041	30.90	9,277	19.06
209	Khajuri (SC)	Sunirmal Paik	JP	19,071	43.76	Sunil Sit	CPI(M)	10,007	22.96	9,064	20.80
210	Contai North	Rasbehari Pal	JP	25,177	49.03	Sailaja Das	INC	9,834	19.15	15,343	29.88
211	Contai South	Satya Brata Maiti	JP	32,148	72.42	Sudhir Chandra Das	IND	4,556	10.26	27,592	62.16
212	Ramnagar	Balailal Das Mahapatra	JP	19,742	42.43	Rohini Karan	CPI(M)	14,071	30.24	5,671	12.19
213	Egra	Prabodh Chandra Sinha	JP	32,017	68.37	Anadi Nandan Das	CPI(M)	7,536	16.09	24,481	52.28
214	Mugberia	Kiranmay Nanda	JP	21,863	46.94	Amarendra Krishna Goswami	CPI(M)	14,063	30.19	7,800	16.75
215	Pataspur	Janmejoy Ojha	JP	20,461	37.65	Barendra Nath Patra	INC	13,890	25.56	6,571	12.09
216	Sabang	Gouranga Samanta	BBC	19,730	41.94	Surya Kanta Mahapatra	JP	13,425	28.54	6,305	13.40
217	Pingla	Haripada Jana	JP	14,328	31.76	Bijoy Das	INC	13,030	28.88	1,298	2.88
218	Debra	Syed Morazzam Hossain	CPI(M)	16,581	37.95	Sukumar Das	INC	13,979	32.00	2,602	5.95
219	Keshpur (SC)	Rajani Kanta Doloi	INC	20,210	40.15	Ajoy Kumar Dolui	CPI(M)	12,737	25.30	7,473	14.85
220	Garhbeta East	Subhendu Mondal	CPI(M)	13,498	32.16	Panchanan Sinha Roy	JP	11,212	26.71	2,286	5.45
221	Garhbeta West (SC)	Santosh Bisui	CPI(M)	17,442	37.52	Krishana Prasad Duley	CPI	11,666	25.10	5,776	12.42
222	Salbani	Sundar Hazra	CPI(M)	19,721	43.55	Basanti Mahata	INC	11,707	25.85	8,014	17.70
223	Midnapore	Bankim Behari Pal	JP	17,396	33.31	Kamakhaya Charan Ghosh	CPI	13,935	26.68	3,461	6.63
224	Kharagpur Town	Sudhir Dassharma	JP	14,396	34.31	Jatindra Nath Mitra	CPI(M)	9,872	23.53	4,524	10.78
225	Kharagpur Rural	Sk. Siraj Ali	CPI(M)	11,744	27.46	Deban Das	CPI	11,365	26.57	379	0.89
226	Keshiari (ST)	Khudiram Singh	CPI(M)	18,492	45.45	Budhan Chandra Tudu	INC	11,244	27.64	7,248	17.81
227	Narayangarh	Krishna Das Roy	INC	13,772	28.45	Mihir Kumar Laha	JP	12,613	26.06	1,159	2.39
228	Dantan	Pradyot Kumar Mahanti	JP	20,089	40.91	Dwibedi Rabindra Nath	CPI	16,686	33.98	3,403	6.93
229	Nayagram (ST)	Budhadeb Singh	CPI(M)	9,872	24.42	Subodh Hansda	JP	7,344	18.17	2,528	6.25
230	Gopiballavpur	Santosh Rana	IND	13,401	25.67	Abani Bhusan Satpathi	CPI(M)	11,714	22.44	1,687	3.23
231	Jhargram	Ram Chandra Satpathy	CPI(M)	21,376	41.04	Birendra Bijoy Malla Deb	INC	12,394	23.80	8,982	17.24
232	Binpur (ST)	Sambhunath Mandi	CPI(M)	11,471	28.68	Dakhin Murmu	JP	9,920	24.80	1,551	3.88
233	Banduan (ST)	Sudhangshu Sekhar Majhi	CPI(M)	12,165	33.87	Buddeswar Majhi	INC	8,721	24.28	3,444	9.59
234	Manbazar	Nakul Chandra Mahata	CPI(M)	22,699	43.52	Sitaram Mahato	INC	18,963	36.36	3,736	7.16
235	Balrampur (ST)	Bikram Tudu	CPI(M)	18,677	53.17	Rup Singh Majhi	INC	9,433	26.86	9,244	26.31
236	Arsa	Daman Chandra Kuiry	AIFB	22,800	48.41	Tilakeshwar Majhi	JP	8,722	18.52	14,078	29.89
237	Jhalda	Satya Ranjan Mahato	AIFB	22,150	50.79	Subhas Chandra Mahato	INC	10,628	24.37	11,522	26.42
238	Jaipur	Ram Krishna Mahato	INC	13,195	35.91	Chakradhar Mahato	JP	11,312	30.78	1,883	5.13
239	Purulia	Mahadeb Mukherjee	CPI(M)	18,540	42.77	Sanat Kumar Mukherjee	IND	10,764	24.83	7,776	17.94
240	Para (SC)	Gobinda Bauri	CPI(M)	9,185	26.91	Sarat Chandra Das	INC	7,707	22.58	1,478	4.33
241	Raghunathpur (SC)	Bijoy Bauri	SUCI	9,453	28.41	Nepal Bauri	JP	9,112	27.39	341	1.02
242	Kashipur (ST)	Surendra Nath Majhi	CPI(M)	9,534	27.75	Rampada Majhi	JP	7,601	22.12	1,933	5.63
243	Hura	Ambarish Mukhopadhyay	CPI(M)	10,445	28.29	Raj Rajeshwari Prasad Singh Deo	JP	9,824	26.61	621	1.68
244	Taldangra	Mohini Mohan Panda	CPI(M)	35,564	59.54	Phani Bhusan Singhababu	INC	12,802	21.43	22,762	38.11
245	Raipur (ST)	Apindra Kisku	CPI(M)	21,234	44.28	Gangadhar Murmu	INC	10,446	21.78	10,788	22.50
246	Ranibandh (ST)	SUCIhand Soren	CPI(M)	26,809	64.25	Jadunath Murmu	JP	8,727	20.92	18,082	43.33
247	Indpur (SC)	Binode Behari Maji	JP	21,864	47.13	Radharaman Moi	BBC	15,727	33.90	6,137	13.23
248	Chhatna	Subhas Goswami	RSP	11,833	30.26	Kamalakanta Hembram	INC	10,974	28.06	859	2.20
249	Gangajalghati (SC)	Nabani Barui	CPI(M)	30,188	67.19	Saktipada Maji	INC	8,861	19.72	21,327	47.47
250	Barjora	Aswini Kumar Raj	CPI(M)	37,104	63.62	Sudhangshu Sekhar Tewari	INC	11,982	20.55	25,122	43.07
251	Bankura	Partha De	CPI(M)	20,682	45.63	Anandi Kundu	JP	9,925	21.90	10,757	23.73
252	Onda	Anil Mukherjee	AIFB	16,225	33.79	Sambhu Narayan Goswami	INC	14,074	29.31	2,151	4.48
253	Vishnupur	Achintya Krishna Roy	CPI(M)	22,511	52.23	Ardhendu Mitra	INC	11,099	25.75	11,412	26.48
254	Kotulpur	Gunadhar Choudhary	CPI(M)	24,429	50.95	Akshay Kumar Koley	INC	13,731	28.64	10,698	22.31
255	Indas (SC)	Badan Bora	CPI(M)	27,887	63.14	Nabadurga	JP	8,849	20.03	19,038	43.11
256	Sonamukhi (SC)	Sukhendu Khan	CPI(M)	26,288	52.75	Kanai Saha	JP	11,003	22.08	15,285	30.67
257	Kulti	Madhu Banerjee	MFB	12,492	34.30	Ghatak Sibdas	INC	12,116	33.27	376	1.03
258	Barabani	Sunil Basu Roy	CPI(M)	22,514	49.58	Sukumar Bandopadhya	INC	15,674	34.52	6,840	15.06
259	Hirapur	Bamapada Mukherjee	CPI(M)	24,021	58.62	Santimoy Aich	INC	9,162	22.36	14,859	36.26
260	Asansol	Haradhan Roy	CPI(M)	17,474	46.59	Gopikaranjan Mitra	INC	12,557	33.48	4,917	13.11
261	Raniganj	Haradhan Roy	CPI(M)	24,570	59.42	Sarojaksha Mukherjee	INC	6,156	14.89	18,414	44.53
262	Jamuria	Bikash Chowdhury	CPI(M)	20,582	52.20	Chandra Sekhar Bandopadhya	INC	9,092	23.06	11,490	29.14
263	Ukhra (SC)	Lakhan Bagdi	CPI(M)	21,714	52.63	Gopal Mondal	INC	12,714	30.82	9,000	21.81
264	Durgapur-I	Dilip Kumar Majundar	CPI(M)	27,697	59.34	Tapan Das Gupta	INC	9,992	21.41	17,705	37.93
265	Durgapur-II	Tarun Chatterjee	CPI(M)	34,287	64.06	Ajit Banerjee	INC	12,472	23.30	21,815	40.76
266	Kanksa (SC)	Lakshinarayan Saha	CPI(M)	28,601	63.54	Samir Kumar Saha	INC	9,885	21.96	18,716	41.58
267	Ausgram (SC)	Shreedhar Malik	CPI(M)	33,427	67.49	Madan Lohar	JP	9,044	18.26	24,383	49.23
268	Bhatar	Bholanath Sen	INC	29,324	56.52	Saktipada Chattopadhya	AIFB	20,587	39.68	8,737	16.84
269	Galsi	Debranjan Sen	AIFB	26,613	62.28	Niradendu Koner	INC	8,075	18.90	18,538	43.38
270	Burdwan North	Dwarka Nath Tah	CPI(M)	35,702	65.54	Sudhir Chandra Dawn	INC	11,336	20.81	24,366	44.73
271	Burdwan South	Benoy Krishna Chowdhry	CPI(M)	29,115	51.84	Pradip Bhattacharyya	INC	16,731	29.79	12,384	22.05
272	Khandaghosh (SC)	Purna Chandra Malik	CPI(M)	29,446	59.28	Monoranjan Pramanik	INC	15,322	30.84	14,124	28.44
273	Raina	Ram Narayan Goswami	CPI(M)	33,135	63.39	Ajit Krishna Bhattacharya	INC	11,633	22.26	21,502	41.13
274	Jamalpur (SC)	Sunil Santra	MFB	20,470	48.01	Puranjoy Pramanik	INC	14,195	33.29	6,275	14.72
275	Memari	Benoy Konar	CPI(M)	36,230	65.19	Surya Narayan Pal	JP	9,873	17.77	26,357	47.42
276	Kalna	Guruprasad Sinha Roy	CPI(M)	31,826	56.06	Debendra Bejoy Ghosh	JP	13,074	23.03	18,752	33.03
277	Nadanghat	Syed Abdul Habibullah	CPI(M)	35,814	65.70	Biswanath Basu	INC	12,461	22.86	23,353	42.84
278	Manteswar	Hemanta Kumar Roy	CPI(M)	31,298	63.57	Tuhin Kumar Samanta	INC	11,848	24.07	19,450	39.50
279	Purbasthali	Manoranjan Nath	CPI(M)	35,293	66.00	Rama Debi	JP	12,345	23.08	22,948	42.92
280	Katwa	Haramohan Sinha	CPI(M)	36,290	61.15	Nityananda Thakur	JP	12,556	21.16	23,734	39.99
281	Mangalkot	Nikhilananda Sar	CPI(M)	29,638	60.83	Madan Chowdhury	JP	14,037	28.81	15,601	32.02
282	Ketugram (SC)	Raicharan Majhi	CPI(M)	29,196	61.79	Pravakar Mandal	INC	9,192	19.45	20,004	42.34
283	Nanur (SC)	Banamali Das	CPI(M)	27,107	63.04	Dulal Saha	INC	7,993	18.59	19,114	44.45
284	Bolpur	Jyotsna Kumar Gupta	RSP	15,330	41.39	Geurhari Chandra	INC	9,676	26.13	5,654	15.26
285	Labhpur	Sunil Kumar Mazumdar	CPI(M)	18,853	53.59	Eunis Mallick	INC	7,016	19.94	11,837	33.65
286	Dubrajpur	Bhakti Bhusan Mandal	AIFB	21,328	58.18	Enayet Karim Chowdhury	JP	9,782	26.69	11,546	31.49
287	Rajnagar (SC)	Siddheswar Mandal	AIFB	17,823	48.23	Jiten Kumar Mondal	INC	7,110	19.24	10,713	28.99
288	Suri	Suniti Chattaraj	INC	17,386	34.31	Arun Kumar Chowdhury	CPI(M)	13,712	27.06	3,674	7.25
289	Mahammad Bazar	Dhirendra Nath Sen	CPI(M)	21,073	50.11	Nitai Pada Ghosh	INC	12,885	30.64	8,188	19.47
290	Mayureswar (SC)	Panchanan Let (Bara)	CPI(M)	16,665	47.63	Gunakar Mandal	JP	8,721	24.93	7,944	22.70
291	Rampurhat	Shanshaka Sekhar Mondal	AIFB	13,798	33.48	Tapas Kumar Mukhopadhyay	JP	7,273	17.65	6,525	15.83
292	Hansan (SC)	Trilochan Mal	RCPI	14,883	39.60	Asit Kumar Mal	IND	6,894	18.34	7,989	21.26
293	Nalhati	Bhabaui Prasad Chattopadyay	AIFB	17,202	51.52	Abhoy Charan Das	INC	7,188	21.53	10,014	29.99
294	Murarai	Motahar Hossain	INC	24,429	50.64	Bazle Ahammad	CPI(M)	16,755	34.73	7,674	15.91
