= Rejinagar Assembly constituency =

Rejinagar
- Constituency No. 70 for the West Bengal Legislative Assembly
- Interactive Map Outlining Rejinagar Assembly Constituency

Constituency details
- Country: India
- Region: East India
- State: West Bengal
- District: Murshidabad
- Lok Sabha constituency: Baharampur
- Established: 2011
- Total electors: 2,59,771
- Reservation: None

Member of Legislative Assembly
- 18th West Bengal Legislative Assembly
- Incumbent Sakharav Sarkar
- Party: BJP
- Alliance: NDA
- Elected year: 2026^

Rejinagar Assembly constituency is an assembly constituency in Murshidabad district in the Indian state of West Bengal.

== Overview ==
As per orders of the Delimitation Commission, No. 70 Rejinagar Assembly constituency covers Beldanga II community development block, and Begunbari, Kapasdanga and Mirjapur I gram panchayats of Beldanga I community development block.

Rejinagar Assembly constituency is part of No. 10 Baharampur Lok Sabha constituency.

== Members of the Legislative Assembly ==
Year	Portrait	Name	Party
2011		Humayun Kabir	Indian National Congress
2013^		Rabiul Alam Chowdhury	Indian National Congress
2016		Rabiul Alam Chowdhury	Indian National Congress
2021		Rabiul Alam Chowdhury	Trinamool Congress
2026		Humayun Kabir (Note: Served from 13 May 2026 until his resignation in 15 May 2026 (2 days))	Aam Janata Unnayan Party
2026^		Sakharav Sarkar (Note: Term of office: 28 October 2026- Incumbent Tenure length: 9 days)	Bharatiya Janata Party

- ^ denotes by-election

== Election results ==
Vote share of Winning candidates
2026 (by-poll)	63.14%
2026	51.62%
2021	56.31%
2016	43.12%
2013 (by-poll)	39.08%
2011	49.74%

Margin of victory
2026 (by-poll)	36.85%
2026	24.60%
2021	32.44%
2016	3.00%
2013 (by-poll)	6.85%
2011	5.62%

=== 2026 by-election ===
2026 West Bengal Legislative Assembly by-election: Rejinagar
Party	Candidate	Votes	%	±%
BJP	Sakharav Sarkar	129,914	63.14	▲36.12
AJUP	Golam Nabi Azad	54,098	26.29	▼25.33
INC	Mohammad Abdullahil Kafi	6,168	3.00	▲1.29
MAITC	Rabiul Alam Chowdhury	3,847	1.87	New entry
CPI(M)	Mohammad Sayeed	3,797	1.85	New entry
DTC	Safiuzzaman Sheikh	2,044	0.99	New entry
NOTA	None of the above	594	0.29	▼0.39
Majority		75,816	36.85	▲12.25
Turnout		2,05,747	80.08	▼13.04
BJP gain from AJUP		Swing		

=== 2026 ===
2026 West Bengal Legislative Assembly election: Rejinagar
Party	Candidate	Votes	%	±%
AJUP	Humayun Kabir	123,536	51.62	New entry
BJP	Bapan Ghosh	64,660	27.02	▲3.15
AITC	Ataur Rahaman	41,718	17.43	▼38.88
INC	Jillu Sheikh	4,101	1.71	▼16.01
NOTA	None of the above	1,634	0.68	▼0.06
Majority		58,876	24.60	▼7.84
Turnout		2,39,676	93.12	
AJUP gain from AITC		Swing		

=== 2021 ===
2021 West Bengal Legislative Assembly election: Rejinagar
Party	Candidate	Votes	%	±%
AITC	Rabiul Alam Chowdhury	118,494	56.31	▲48.4
BJP	Arabinda Biswas	50,226	23.87	▲18.05
INC	Kafiruddin Sheikh	37,282	17.72	▼25.4
NOTA	None of the Above	1,560	0.74	▼0.42
Majority		68,268	32.44	▲29.44
Turnout		2,10,445	81.01	▼1.26
AITC gain from INC		Swing		

=== 2016 ===
2016 West Bengal Legislative Assembly election: Rejinagar
Party	Candidate	Votes	%	±%
INC	Rabiul Alam Chowdhury	79,770	43.12	▲4.04
Independent	Humayun Kabir	74,210	40.12	New
AITC	Begum Siddika	14,631	7.91	▼15.99
BJP	Bankim Karmakar	10,771	5.82	▲3.65
NOTA	None of the Above	2,150	1.16	New entry
Majority		5,560	3.00	▼3.85
Turnout		1,84,993	82.27	▼1.82
INC hold		Swing		

==== 2013 by-election ====
The 2013 by-election was necessitated by the switch-over of sitting Congress MLA Humayun Kabir to Trinamool Congress.

2013 West Bengal Legislative Assembly by-election: Rejinagar
Party	Candidate	Votes	%	±%
INC	Rabiul Alam Chowdhury	66,876	39.08	▼10.66
RSP	Sirajul Islam Mondal	55,154	32.23	▼11.89
AITC	Humayun Kabir	40,911	23.9	▲23.9
BJP	Salahuddin Sheikh	3,720	2.17	▼2.15
Majority		11,722	6.85	▲1.23
Turnout		1,71,128	84.09	▲1.65
INC hold		Swing		

=== 2011 ===
In the 2011 election, Humayun Kabir of Congress defeated his nearest rival Serajul Islam Mondal of RSP.

2011 West Bengal Legislative Assembly election: Rejinagar
Party	Candidate	Votes	%	±%
INC	Humayun Kabir	77,542	49.74	
RSP	Sirajul Islam Mondal	68,781	44.12	
BJP	Arabinda Biswas	6,733	4.32	
JD(U)	Fulchand Sheikh	2,831		
Majority		8,761	5.62	
Turnout		1,55,887	82.44	
INC win (new seat)				
