= Rabiul Alam Chowdhury =

Indian politician

Member of the West Bengal Legislative Assembly
- In office 28 February 2013 – 4 May 2026
- Preceded by: Humayun Kabir
- Succeeded by: Humayun Kabir
- Constituency: Rejinagar

Personal details
- Party: Mamata All India Trinamool Congress (2026–present)
- Other political affiliations: Indian National Congress (until 2021); Trinamool Congress (2021–2026)
- Education: S. R. Fatepuria College

Rabiul Alam Chowdhury is a West Bengal politician from Murshidabad district. He served as a Trinamool Congress M.L.A from 2021 to 2026. He also became an M.L.A from Rejinagar Assembly constituency on Indian National Congress ticket in 2013 & 2016. He is the nephew of 3 times former M.L.A of Beldanga Assembly constituency Nurul Choudhury.
