= Naoda Assembly constituency =

Naoda
- Constituency No. 74 for the West Bengal Legislative Assembly
- Interactive Map Outlining Naoda Assembly Constituency

Constituency details
- Country: India
- Region: East India
- State: West Bengal
- District: Murshidabad
- Lok Sabha constituency: Baharampur
- Established: 1951
- Total electors: 247,688
- Reservation: None

Member of Legislative Assembly
- 18th West Bengal Legislative Assembly
- Incumbent Humayun Kabir
- Party: AJUP
- Alliance: None
- Elected year: 2026

Naoda Assembly constituency is an assembly constituency in Murshidabad district in the Indian state of West Bengal.

== Overview ==
As per orders of the Delimitation Commission, No. 74 Naoda Assembly constituency covers Naoda community development block and Chaitannapur I, Chaitannapur II, Madda and Mahula II gram panchayats of Beldanga I community development block.

Naoda Assembly constituency is part of No. 10 Baharampur Lok Sabha constituency.

== Members of the Legislative Assembly ==
Year	Name	Party
1951	Mohammad Israil	Indian National Congress
1957	Mohammad Israil	Indian National Congress
1962	Mohammad Israil	Indian National Congress
1967	Mohammad Israil	Indian National Congress
1969	Nasiruddin Khan	Progressive Muslim League
1971	Nasiruddin Khan	Independent politician
1972	Nasiruddin Khan	Indian Union Muslim League
1977	Jayanta Kumar Biswas	Revolutionary Socialist Party
1982	Jayanta Kumar Biswas	Revolutionary Socialist Party
1987	Jayanta Kumar Biswas	Revolutionary Socialist Party
1991	Nasiruddin Khan	Indian National Congress
1996	Jayanta Kumar Biswas	Revolutionary Socialist Party
2001	Abu Taher Khan	Indian National Congress
2006	Abu Taher Khan	Indian National Congress
2011	Abu Taher Khan	Indian National Congress
2016	Abu Taher Khan	Indian National Congress
2019^	Sahina Mumtaz Begum	Trinamool Congress
2021	Sahina Mumtaz Begum	Trinamool Congress
2026	Humayun Kabir	Aam Janata Unnayan Party

- ^ = by-election

== Election results ==
=== 2026 ===
2026 West Bengal Legislative Assembly election: Naoda
Party	Candidate	Votes	%	±%
AJUP	Humayun Kabir	86,463	39.02	New entry
BJP	Rana Mondal	58,520	26.41	▲4.90
AITC	Sahina Mumtaz Begum	51,867	23.41	▼34.75
INC	Matiur Rahaman	16,009	7.22	▼8.39
SUCI(C)	Abdus Salam	2,055	0.93	New entry
RSP	Habibur Rahaman Mondal	1,800	0.81	New entry
Independent	Humayun Kabir Sheikh	1,305	0.59	New entry
NOTA	None of the above	1,118	0.50	▼0.15
Majority		27,943	12.61	▼24.04
Turnout		2,21,600		
AJUP gain from AITC		Swing		

=== 2021 ===
2021 West Bengal Legislative Assembly election: Naoda
Party	Candidate	Votes	%	±%
AITC	Sahina Mumtaz Begum	117,684	58.16	▲10.09
BJP	Anupam Mondal	43,531	21.51	▲2.74
INC	Mosarraf Hossain Mondal	31,588	15.61	▼12.85
Independent	Samik Mandal	4,393	2.17	New entry
Independent	Saminul Ansary	1,397	0.69	New entry
NOTA	None of the above	1,308	0.65	▼0.20
Majority		74,153	36.65	▲17.04
Turnout		2,02,349	81.70	▼8.05
AITC hold		Swing		

=== 2019 ===
Bye-election, 2019: Naoda
Party	Candidate	Votes	%	±%
AITC	Sahina Mumtaz Begum	82,921	48.07	+24.20
INC	Sunil Kumar Mondal	49,099	28.46	−6.00
BJP	Anupam Mandal	32,379	18.77	+4.53
RSP	Sirajul Islam Mondal	6,621	3.84	−19.83
NOTA	None of the above	1,472	0.85	−1.26
Majority		33,822	19.61	
Turnout		1,72,492	73.65	−9.57
AITC gain from INC		Swing	+15.10	

=== 2011-2019 ===
In the 2011 election, Abu Taher Khan of Congress defeated his nearest rival Jayanta Biswas of RSP.

West Bengal assembly elections, 2011: Naoda constituency
Party	Candidate	Votes	%	±%
INC	Abu Taher Khan	80,758	51.60	+3.77
RSP	Jayanta Biswas	66,963	42.79	−4.31
BJP	Biplab Mondal	3,774	2.41	
SDPI	Islam Malitiya	2,281	1.46	
Independent	Jayanta Ghosh	1,555		
JD(U)	Kashinath Dutta	640		
BSP	Bhagabat Das	537		
Turnout		156,508	85.11	
INC hold		Swing	+8.08	

In 2016, he had won in the election and continued his work as M.L.A. In 2019, he stands in Lok Sabha election from Murshidabad constituency from AITC.

=== 1977–2006 ===
In the 2006 and 2001 state assembly elections Abu Taher Khan of Congress won the Naoda assembly seat defeating his nearest rival Jayanta Kumar Biswas of RSP. Contests in most years were multi cornered but only winners and runners are being mentioned. Jayanta Kumar Biswas of RSP defeated Nasiruddin Khan of Congress in 1996. Nasiruddin Khan of Congress defeated Jayanta Kumar Biswas of RSP in 1991. Jayanta Kumar Biswas of RSP defeated Harun Ali Rashid of Congress in 1987, and Nasiruddin Khan of Congress in 1982 and 1977.

=== 1951–1972 ===
Nasiruddin Khan, representing IUML in 1972, Independent in 1971, and Progressive Muslim League in 1969, won the Naoda seat. Mohammad Israil of Congress won in 1967, 1962, 1957 and in independent India's first election in 1951.
