= Kamalesh Chatterjee =

Indian politician

Member of the West Bengal Legislative Assembly
- In office 2016–2021
- Preceded by: Id Mohammad
- Succeeded by: Humayun Kabir
- Constituency: Bharatpur, West Bengal

Personal details
- Party: Indian National Congress
- Education: Kandi Raj College
- Profession: Politician

Kamalesh Chatterjee is an Indian politician from West Bengal. He was elected as a Member of the Legislative Assembly in 2016 West Bengal Legislative Assembly election from Bharatpur, as a member of the Indian National Congress.
