= Samar Hazra =

Indian politician

Samar Hazra is an Indian politician, belonging to the Marxist Forward Bloc. He won in 2016 from the Jamalpur constituency for West Bengal Legislative Assembly as a Communist Party of India (Marxist) candidate.

Hazra won the Jamalpur seat in the 1991, 1996, 2001 and 2006 assembly elections. He lost the seat in the 2011 elections, but regained it in the 2016 election. Hazra's house was attacked in post-poll violence after the 2014 Lok Sabha election.
