= Ramendu Sinharay =

Indian politician

Member of the West Bengal Legislative Assembly
- In office 2 May 2021 – 4 May 2026
- Preceded by: Rachhpal Singh
- Succeeded by: Santu Pan
- Constituency: Tarakeswar

Personal details
- Party: Trinamool Congress
- Profession: Politician

Ramendu Sinharay is an Indian politician member of Trinamool Congress. He is an MLA, elected from the Tarakeswar constituency in the 2021 West Bengal Legislative Assembly election. He was arrested from Karnataka on 19th june 2026 for corruption.
