= Pratim Chatterjee =

Indian politician (1940–2018)

Honourable Minister Pratim chatterjee MLA

Member of the West Bengal Legislative Assembly for Tarakeswar
- In office 12 March 1996 – 13 May 2011
- Preceded by: Santi Chatterjee
- Succeeded by: Rachhpal Singh

Personal details
- Born: 1 January 1940 Tarakeswar, Hooghly, West Bengal, India
- Died: 19 March 2018 (aged 78) Kolkata, West Bengal, India
- Party: Marxist Forward Bloc
- Spouse: Late Chitra Chatterjee
- Children: One Daughter
- Occupation: Politician, Actor, Social Worker

Pratim Chatterjee (1940–2018) was an Indian politician from the state of West Bengal and a former minister in the West Bengal Government.
