= Calcutta Swimming Club =

Swim club in Kolkata, India

Coordinates: 22.5675°N 88.3416°E

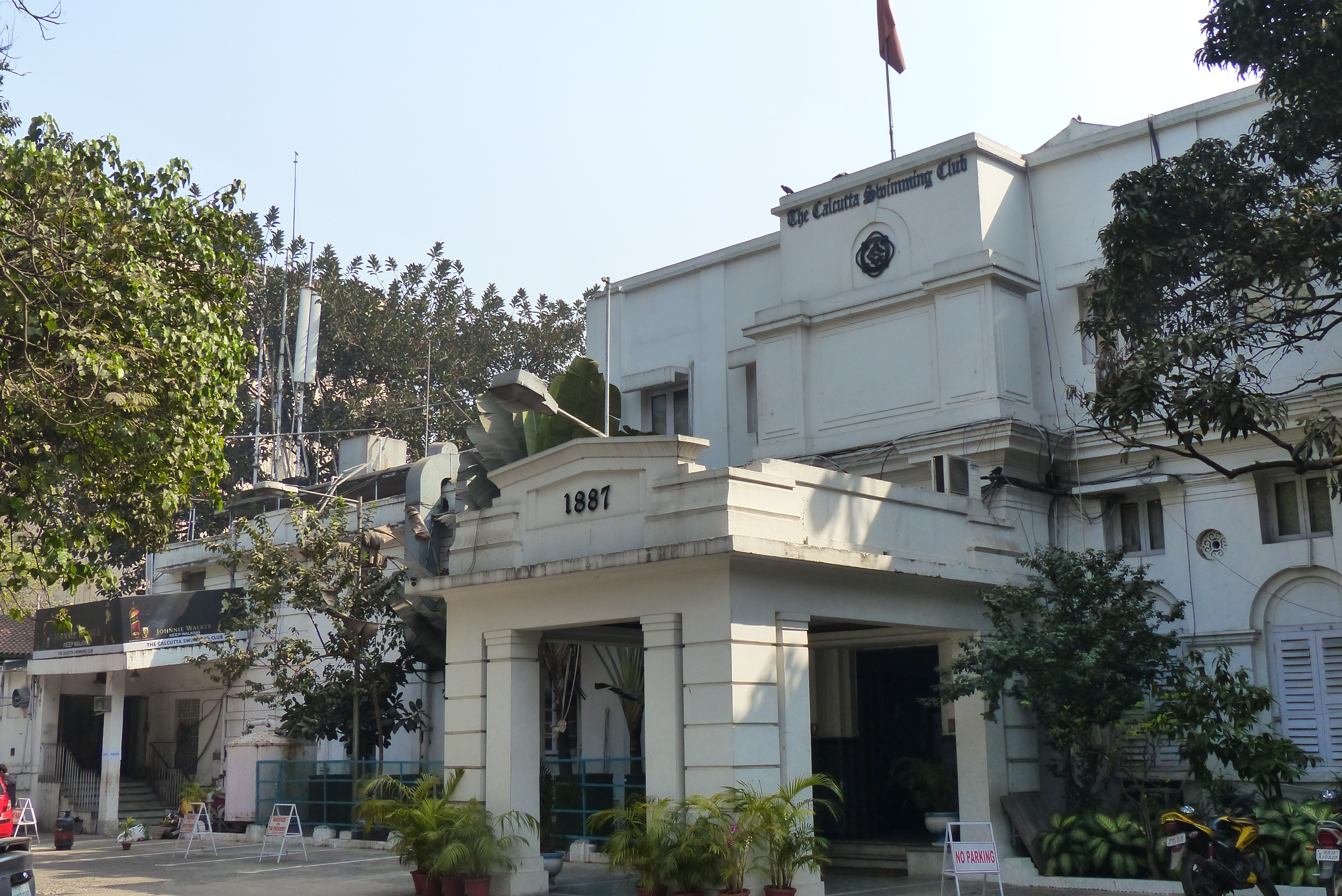

Club information
- Full name: The Calcutta Swimming Club
- Short name: CSC
- City: Kolkata
- Founded: 1887 (as the Calcutta Swimming Bath); 1923 (as the Calcutta Swimming Club)
- Home pool(s): 1, Strand Rd, B.B.D. Bagh, Kolkata, West Bengal 700001

The Calcutta Swimming Club (often known by the abbreviation CSC), is a social club in Kolkata (formerly Calcutta), India. The club is located on the Strand Road near Babughat. The club is the oldest swimming club in India.

== History ==
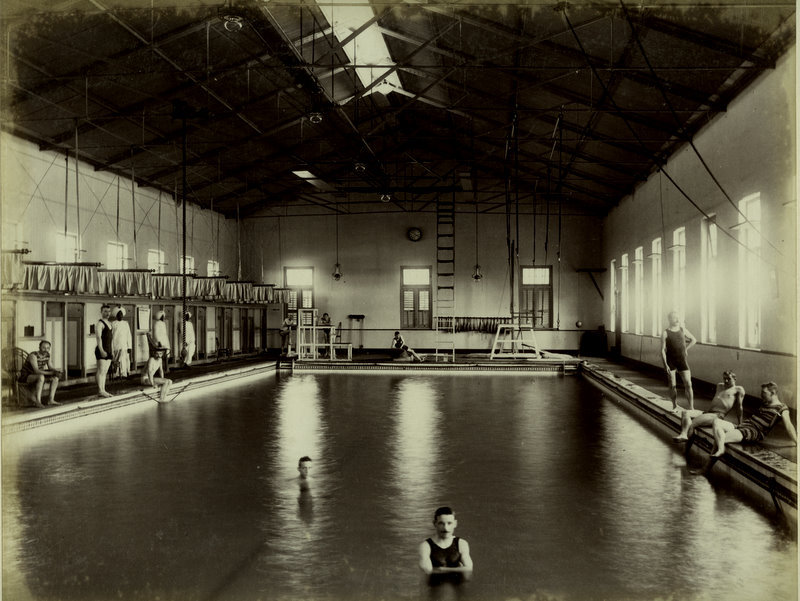
The Calcutta Swimming Bath

In 1886, the Times of India reproduced a report from The Statesman the on a meeting held by a group of Englishmen to establish a "Swimming Bath" in Kolkata. The report stated that a site "at the extreme north-easterly end of the Eden Gardens" had been finalised. The report identified the merchants GWF Buckland and AH Wallis as the key movers behind the initiative. Buckland and Wallis intended to provide amenities for their junior assistants, who lacked the social standing and financial means to gain admission to older and more expensive clubs. Accordingly, the Calcutta Swimming Bath was established in 1887, by order of the Lieutenant Governor of Bengal. An editorial in The Statesman welcomed its establishment. In 1897, as a result of a a major earthquake, the club's pool suffered serious damage in the form of a large crack. The club, in its present form was founded in 1923 by Walter Davis, a partner of Hamilton & Company, who was also the first secretary of the club The Lieutenant Governor of Bengal was the head of the club from its inception until 1923 when N. Hamilton was elected as its first president.

The Calcutta Swimming Bath initially comprised only an indoor pool, while an outdoor pool was constructed in the 1930s. From the mid-1920, ladies were permitted to use the pool during specified periods and mixed bathing was allowed once a week. In 1941, in appreciation of the club's contribution to the war effort, a fighter aircraft was renamed the"Calcutta Swimming Club". The club's membership today is predominantly drawn from the Marwari and Gujarati communities of Calcutta.

== Facilities ==
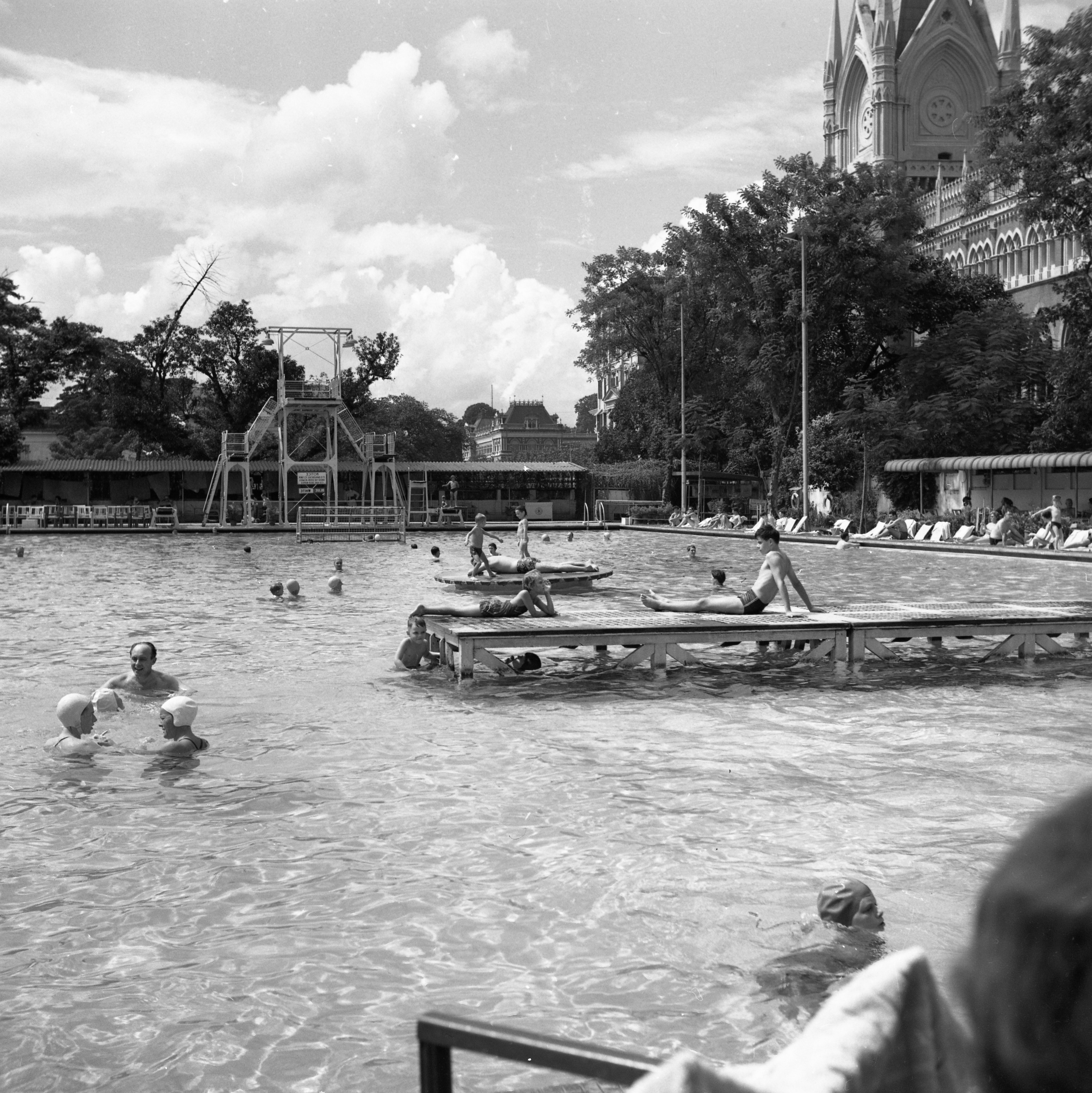
Old photograph of the Calcutta Swimming Club

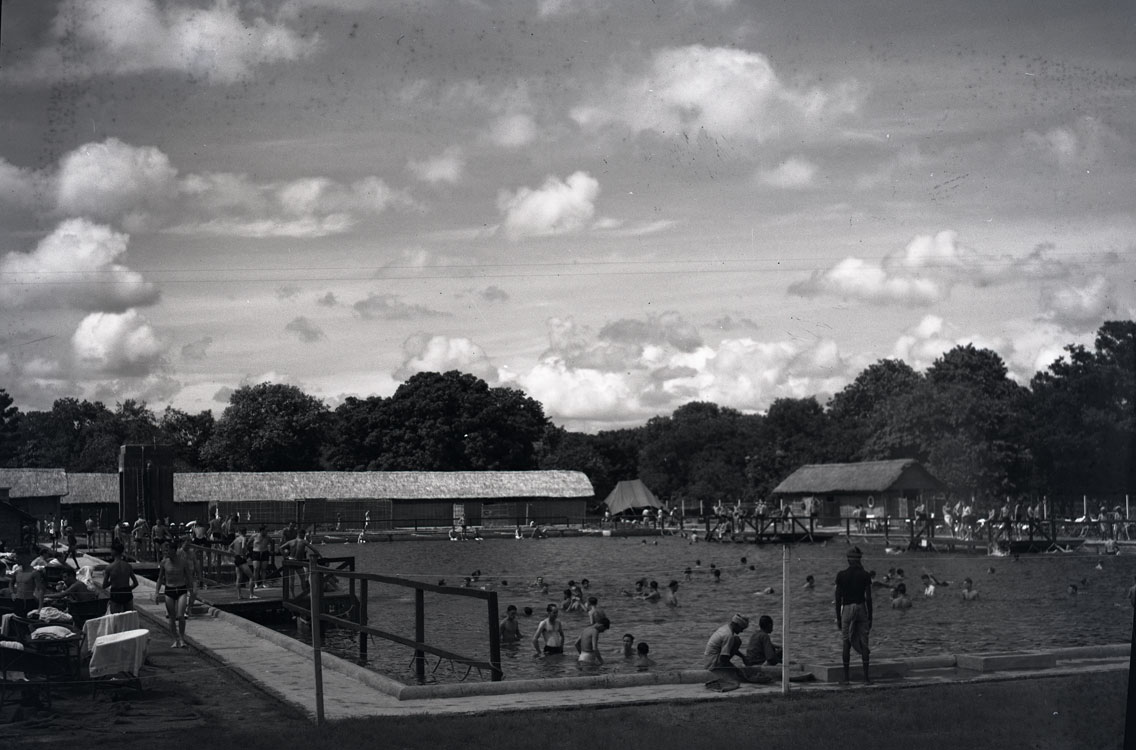
The Calcutta Swimming Club during the Second World War, used by Allied soldiers

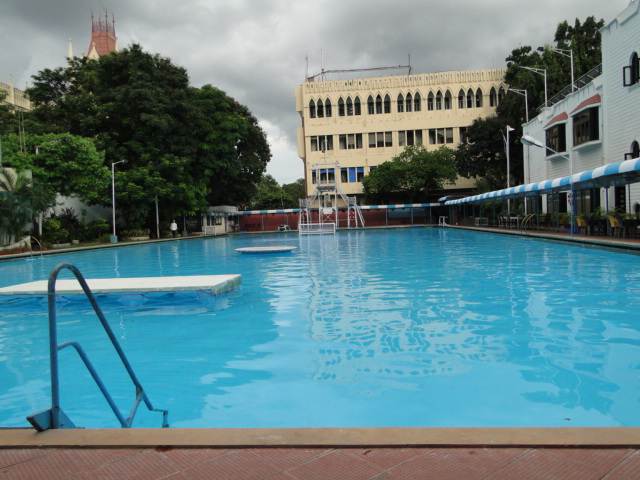
Outdoor pool of the Calcutta Swimming Club

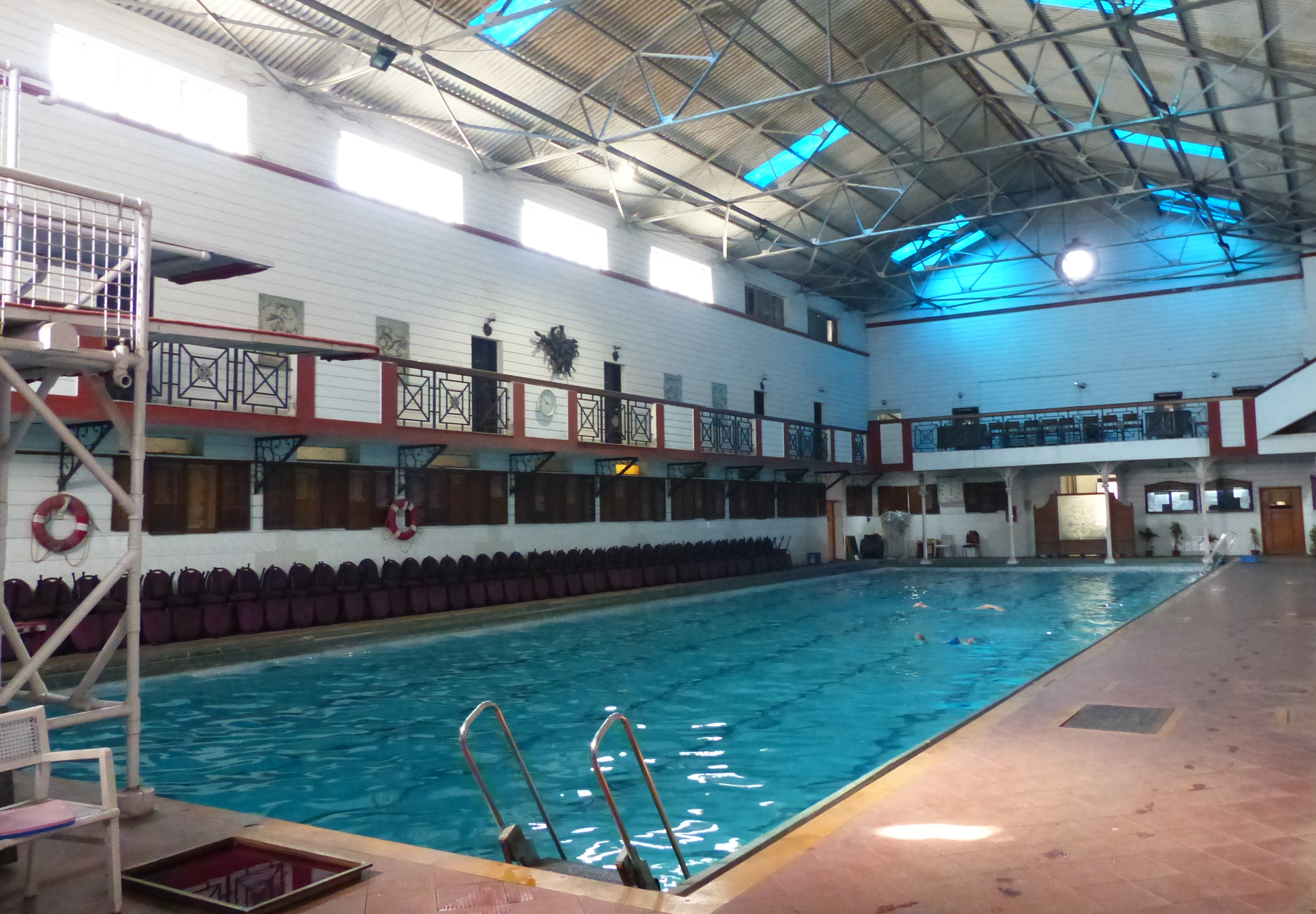
Indoor pool of the Calcutta Swimming Club

Writer A. Frank Thompson has described the Calcutta Swimming Club as "an unlikely oasis of beauty and comfort in the centre of old Calcutta".

== Events and Activities ==
Mussuck Race at the Calcutta Swimming Bath (1894)

In 1894, the Scientific American reproduced an article from the British publication The Graphic about a "mussuck race" taking place at the Calcutta Swimming Bath, involving a mussuck ("a tanned goat skin, which, when used by water carriers, has all the openings sewed up except at the neck"). The race required participants to ride a mussuck (inflated with air) in the water "in full costume, with boots and tall hats, any competitor being counted out who arrives at the goal-one hundred feet from the starting point-with head uncovered". In 1927, the Calcutta Swimming Club organised a "Calcutta vs Rangoon" water polo match, where a team from the club played against a team from the Kokine Swimming Club in Yangon (both teams comprising British and Europeans). The match reportedly attracted a large audience. Today, the club organises colourful Christmas and New Year parties every year. Another tradition is a hasya (humorous) kavi sammelan, where prominent Hindi poets and satirists such as Chirag Jain and Arun Gemini have participated.

== Notable guests and patrons ==
Famous Indian guests and patrons of the club have included the famous Olympian swimmer D.D. Mulji and swimming champion and actress Nafisa Ali. Among notable overseas guests, the legendary British wartime singer Vera Lynn visited the club while touring India in 1944.

== Racial discrimination ==
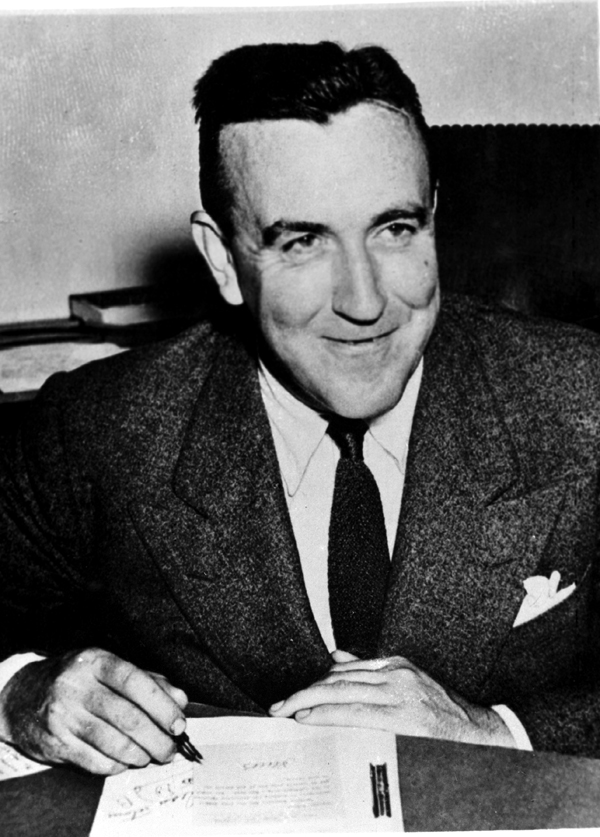
US Ambassador to India Chester Bowles objected to the club's racial admission policies

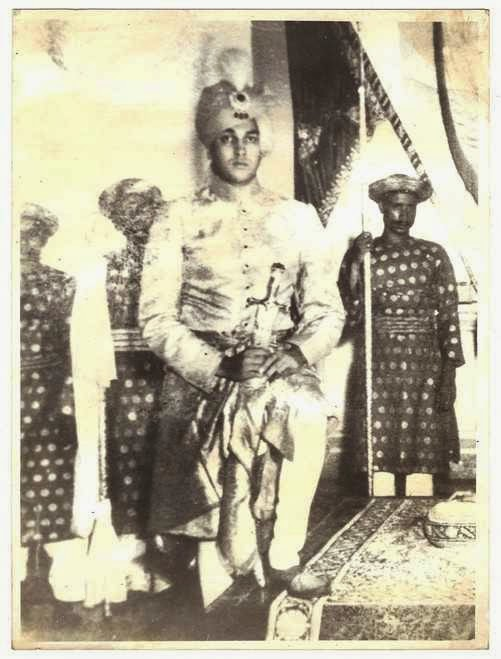
The Maharaja of Cooch Behar was the club's first Indian member

Like many British social clubs established in colonial India, the Calcutta Swimming Club historically had a whites-only admission policy. Along with Indians, African-Americans were also denied admission to the club. The club would not accept Indians as members even after independence. In 1959, the Calcutta Municipal Corporation passed a resolution condemning racial discrimination practised by the club. A few years later, to protest against such discrimination, the then American Ambassador to India, Chester Bowles, directed American diplomats to withdraw their membership of the club. According to the New York Times, the Soviet Ambassador refused to follow suit and "at least a dozen Communist diplomats, including Soviet Consul Rogov, were conspicuous users of the Olympic-sized pool." The situation changed in 1964 (around the time of Bowles' directive), when the Maharaja of Cooch Behar was inducted as the club's first Indian member. In 1976, PT Basu was elected as the first Indian president of the club. A controversial event in connection with the club's racial policies was an incident involving the Marxist politician (and five-time MLA) Ram Chatterjee in 1969. Although the club had by then admitted Indian members, it was still dominated by British and Europeans. To protest against this, Chatterjee brought a busload of Santhal village men, wearing loincloths and armed with bows and arrows, to the club. Chatterjee, together with the village men, barged into the club and jumped into the pool.

== Dress code controversies ==
In independent India, the Calcutta Swimming Club has occasionally attracted public controversy over its dress code. In 1987, the musician Ananda Shankar was denied admission to the club for being dressed in a kurta-pyjama and chappals (the dress code permitting a dhoti or a sherwani but not a kurta-pyjama). Shankar complained to the press and then attempted to enter the club yet again, dressed in the same attire. This time, a group of around 500 workers of the Indian National Congress party, led by Paresh Paul (now a member of the All India Trinamool Congress), followed Shankar and forcibly entered the club. Paul and his group broke vases, furniture and flower pots, and then jumped into the pool fully clothed. Shankar distanced himself from the violence and Paul was subsequently arrested. The club's then president, Mahabir Prasad Jalan, later clarified that no insult was intended to Shankar and that he was welcome to attend in his "usual clothes". In 2017, various news outlets reported that Art of Living instructor Khurshed Batliwala had been denied entry into the club for being dressed in a kurta-pyjama. However, in 2014, the club had invited the then sports minister of West Bengal Madan Mitra to inaugurate a swimming competition and allowed him in wearing a kurta-pyjama (although Mitra apologised if he had inadvertently broken the dress code).

== The Calcutta Swimming Club in film ==
The Calcutta Swimming Club has served as a shooting location for various Bengali films. Notable among them are Satyajit Ray's Seemabaddha (in a scene where the protagonists discuss the club's erstwhile racial admission policies) and Salil Dutta's Ogo Bodhu Shundori, during whose shooting the renowned Bengali actor Uttam Kumar died.
