= Jamalpur, West Bengal Assembly constituency =

Jamalpur
- Constituency No. 262 for the West Bengal Legislative Assembly
- Interactive Map Outlining Jamalpur Assembly Constituency

Constituency details
- Country: India
- Region: East India
- State: West Bengal
- District: Purba Bardhaman
- Lok Sabha constituency: Bardhaman Purba
- Established: 1962
- Total electors: 187,502
- Reservation: SC

Member of Legislative Assembly
- 18th West Bengal Legislative Assembly
- Incumbent Arun Halder
- Party: BJP
- Alliance: NDA
- Elected year: 2026

Jamalpur Assembly constituency is an assembly constituency in Purba Bardhaman district in the Indian state of West Bengal. It is reserved for scheduled castes.

== Overview ==
As per orders of the Delimitation Commission, No. 262 Jamalpur (SC) assembly constituency covers Jamalpur community development block and Mugura gram panchayat of Raina I community development block.

As per orders of Delimitation Commission it is part of No. 38 Bardhaman Purba Lok Sabha constituency. Jamalpur assembly segment was earlier part of Burdwan Lok Sabha constituency.

== Members of the Legislative Assembly ==
Year	Name	Party
1962	Mrityunjoy Pramanik	Indian National Congress
1967	Puranjoy Pramanik	Indian National Congress
1969	Basudeb Malik	Bangla Congress
1971	Kalipada Das	Marxist Forward Bloc
1972	Puranjoy Pramanik	Indian National Congress
1977	Sunil Santra	Marxist Forward Bloc
1982	Sunil Santra	Independent
1987	Sunil Santra	Independent
1991	Samar Hazra	Marxist Forward Bloc
1996	Samar Hazra	Marxist Forward Bloc
2001	Samar Hazra	Marxist Forward Bloc
2006	Samar Hazra	Independent
2011	Ujjal Pramanick	Trinamool Congress
2016	Samar Hazra	Communist Party of India (Marxist)
2021	Alok Kumar Majhi	Trinamool Congress
2026	Arun Halder	Bharatiya Janata Party

== Election results ==
=== 2026 ===
2026 West Bengal Legislative Assembly election: Jamalpur
Party	Candidate	Votes	%	±%
BJP	Arun Halder	99,936	46.53	▲8.29
AITC	Bhutnath Malik	88,758	41.33	▼5.6
CPI(M)	Samar Hazra	18,732	8.72	▼2.55
NOTA	None of the above	1,798	0.84	▼0.55
Majority		11,178	5.2	▼3.49
Turnout		214,774	95.22	▲7.63
BJP gain from AITC		Swing		

=== 2021 ===
2021 West Bengal Legislative Assembly election: Jamalpur
Party	Candidate	Votes	%	±%
AITC	Alok Kumar Majhi	96,999	46.93	▲3.14
BJP	Balaram Bapari	79,028	38.24	▲30.38
CPI(M)	Samar Hazra	23,298	11.27	▼33.26
BSP	Gaurhari Patra	2,024	0.98	▼0.01
NOTA	None of the above	2,865	1.39	
Majority		17,971	8.69	
Turnout		206,690	87.59	
AITC gain from CPI(M)		Swing		

=== 2016 ===
2016 West Bengal Legislative Assembly election: Jamalpur
Party	Candidate	Votes	%	±%
CPI(M)	Samar Hazra	85,491	44.53	▼2.74
AITC	Ujjal Pramanick	84,068	43.79	▼4.94
BJP	Pallab Kumar Roy	15,094	7.86	▲6.07
NOTA	None of the above	2,616	1.36	New entry
BSP	Bankim Santra	1,902	0.99	▲0.44
JDP	Kishore Kumar Biswas	1,424	0.74	▲0.08
Independent	Sanat Bhangi	1,391	0.72	New entry
Majority		1,423	0.74	▼0.72
Turnout		1,91,986	88.60	▼3.53
CPI(M) gain from AITC		Swing		

=== 2011 ===
2011 West Bengal Legislative Assembly election: Jamalpur
Party	Candidate	Votes	%	±%
AITC	Ujjal Pramanick	84,434	48.73	
CPI(M)	Samar Hazra	81,891	47.27	
BJP	Subrata Malik	3,102	1.79	
PDCI	Rabindra Nath Bag	1,721	0.99	
JDP	Pratap Malik	1,149	0.66	
BSP	Suranjan Halder	955	0.55	
Majority		2,543	1.46	
Turnout		1,73,255	92.13	
AITC gain from Independent		Swing		

=== 1977-2006 ===
In 2006, 2001, 1996 and 1991, Samar Hazra, Marxist Forward Bloc won the Jamalpur (SC) assembly seat defeating his nearest rivals, Shankar Chandra Mallick of Trinamool Congress, Ajay Pramanik of Trinamool Congress, Baidyanath Das of Congress and Ajay Pramnik of Congress, in the respective years. Contests in most years were multi cornered but only winners and runners are being mentioned. In 1987, 1982 and 1977, Sunil Santra, MFB, defeated Puranjoy Pramanik of Congress/ ICS.

=== 1962-1972 ===
Puranjoy Pramanik of Congress won the seat in 1972. Kalipada Das of MFB won the seat in 1971. Basudeb Pramanik of Bangla Congress won the seat in 1969. Puranjoy Pramanik of Congress won the seat in 1967. Mrityunjoy Pramanik of Congress won the seat in 1962. Prior to that the seat did not exist.
