= Tarakeswar Assembly constituency =

Tarakeswar
- Constituency No. 198 for the West Bengal Legislative Assembly
- Interactive Map Outlining Tarakeswar Assembly Constituency

Constituency details
- Country: India
- Region: East India
- State: West Bengal
- District: Hooghly
- Lok Sabha constituency: Arambagh
- Established: 1951
- Total electors: 221,972
- Reservation: None

Member of Legislative Assembly
- 18th West Bengal Legislative Assembly
- Incumbent Santu Pan
- Party: BJP
- Alliance: NDA
- Elected year: 2026

Tarakeswar Assembly constituency is an assembly constituency in Hooghly district in the Indian state of West Bengal.

Most Successful parties from Tarakeshwar assembly
1. Marxist Forward Bloc (10 times) (55.6%)
2. Indian National Congress (4 times) (22.2%)
3. Trinamool Congress (3 time) (16.7%)
4. Bharatiya Janata Party (1 time) (5.55%)

== Overview ==
As per orders of the Delimitation Commission, No. 198 Tarakeswar Assembly constituency, also spelt Tarakeshwar, is composed of the following: Tarakeswar Municipality, Tarakeswar community development block, and Bhanderhati I, Bhanderhati II, Gopinathpur I, Gopinathpur II and Perambua Sahabazar gram panchayats of Dhaniakhali community development block.

Tarakeswar Assembly constituency is part of No. 29 Arambagh Lok Sabha constituency (SC).

== Members of the Legislative Assembly ==
Year	Name	Party
1951	Parbati Charan Hazra	Indian National Congress
1957	Parbati Charan Hazra	Indian National Congress
1962	Parbati Charan Hazra	Indian National Congress
1967	Ram Chatterjee	Marxist Forward Bloc
1969	Ram Chatterjee	Marxist Forward Bloc
1971	Ram Chatterjee	Marxist Forward Bloc
1972	Balai Lal Sheth	Indian National Congress
1977	Ram Chatterjee	Marxist Forward Bloc
1982	Ram Chatterjee	Marxist Forward Bloc
1987	Santi Chatterjee	Marxist Forward Bloc
1991	Santi Chatterjee	Marxist Forward Bloc
1996	Pratim Chatterjee	Marxist Forward Bloc
2001	Pratim Chatterjee	Marxist Forward Bloc
2006	Pratim Chatterjee	Marxist Forward Bloc
2011	Rachhpal Singh	Trinamool Congress
2016	Rachhpal Singh	Trinamool Congress
2021	Ramendu Sinharay	Trinamool Congress
2026	Santu Pan	Bharatiya Janata Party

== Election results ==
=== 2026 ===
2026 West Bengal Legislative Assembly election: Tarakeswar
Party	Candidate	Votes	%	±%
BJP	Santu Pan	116,901	52.76	▲9.43
AITC	Ramendu Sinharay	85,902	38.77	▼8.19
CPI(M)	Adesh Khamrui	9,616	4.34	▼2.75
Independent	Diti Bhattacharjee	1,878	0.85	New entry
NOTA	None of the above	1,485	0.67	▼0.67
Majority		30,999	13.99	▲10.36
Turnout		221,578	94.03	▲8.17
BJP gain from AITC		Swing		

=== 2021 ===
2021 West Bengal Legislative Assembly election: Tarakeswar
Party	Candidate	Votes	%	±%
AITC	Ramendu Sinharay	96,698	46.96	▼3.79
BJP	Swapan Dasgupta	89,214	43.33	▲33.97
CPI(M)	Surajit Ghosh	14,595	7.09	New entry
NOTA	None of the above	2,752	1.34	▼0.73
Majority		7,484	3.63	▼10.77
Turnout		205,917	85.86	▼0.76
AITC hold		Swing		

=== 2016 ===
2016 West Bengal Legislative Assembly election: Tarakeswar
Party	Candidate	Votes	%	±%
AITC	Rachhpal Singh	97,588	50.75	▼4.35
NCP	Surajit Ghosh	69,898	36.35	New entry
BJP	Jagannath Das	17,989	9.36	▲6.80
NOTA	None of the Above	3,983	2.07	New entry
JDP	Palash Hansda	2,818	1.47	▼0.23
Majority		27,690	14.40	▼0.06
Turnout		1,92,276	86.62	▼2.59
AITC hold		Swing		

=== 2011 ===
2011 West Bengal Legislative Assembly election: Tarakeswar
Party	Candidate	Votes	%	±%
AITC	Rachhpal Singh	97,022	55.10	New entry
CPI(M)	Pratim Chatterjee	71,550	40.64	New entry
BJP	Ganesh Chakraborty	4,504	2.56	▼32.04
JDP	Palash Hansda	2,996	1.70	New entry
Majority		25,472	14.46	▼9.04
Turnout		1,76,072	89.21	▲1.61
AITC gain from MFB		Swing		

=== 2006 ===
2006 West Bengal Legislative Assembly election: Tarakeswar
Party	Candidate	Votes	%	±%
MFB	Pratim Chatterjee	74,849	58.10	▲3.55
BJP	Krishna Bhattacharjee	44,578	34.60	▲24.80
INC	Ajit Kumar Ghosh	9,400	7.30	New entry
Majority		30,271	23.50	▲0.7
Turnout		1,28,827	87.60	▲4.56
MFB hold		Swing		

=== 2001 ===
2001 West Bengal Legislative Assembly election: Tarakeswar
Party	Candidate	Votes	%	±%
MFB	Pratim Chatterjee	69,186	54.55	
INC	Mohan Ghosh	40,274	31.75	
BJP	Rakhal Chandra Das	12,434	9.80	
Independent	Debasish Chatterjee	3,325	2.62	
Independent	Prabir Pal	1,615	1.27	
Majority		28,912	22.80	
Turnout		1,26,834	83.04	
MFB hold		Swing		

=== 1977-2006 ===
Balai Lal Sheth of Congress won in 1972. Ram Chatterjee of Marxist Forward Block/ Independent won in 1971, 1969 and 1967. Parbati Charan Hazra of Congress won in 1962, 1957 and in independent India's first election in 1951.

=== 1951-1972 ===
Balai Lal Sheth of Congress won in 1972. Ram Chatterjee of Marxist Forward Block/ Independent won in 1971, 1969 and 1967. Parbati Charan Hazra of Congress won in 1962, 1957 and in independent India's first election in 1951.
