= Santu Pan =

Indian politician in West Bengal

Member of the West Bengal Legislative Assembly
- Incumbent
- Assumed office 4 May 2026
- Preceded by: Ramendu Sinharay
- Constituency: Tarakeswar

Personal details
- Party: Bharatiya Janata Party
- Spouse: Puja Karmakar
- Parent: Ananda Pan
- Education: University of Burdwan
- Occupation: Journalist
- Profession: Politician

Santu Pan (born 1997) is a journalist turned Indian politician from West Bengal. He is a member of West Bengal Legislative Assembly from the Tarakeswar Assembly constituency in Hooghly district representing the Bharatiya Janata Party.

== Early life and education ==
Pan is from Goghat, Hooghly district of West Bengal. He is the son of Ananda Pan. He completed his Bachelor of Arts in 2018 and Master of Arts in Mass Communication and Journalism in 2020 at University of Burdwan. He is a journalist. He declared assets worth Rs.50 lakhs in his affidavit to the Election Commission of India.

== Political career ==
Pan won the Tarakeswar Assembly constituency representing the BJP in the 2026 West Bengal Legislative Assembly election. He polled 1,16,901 votes and defeated his nearest rival and sitting MLA, Ramendu Sinharay of the All India Trinamool Congress by a margin of 30,999 votes.

=== Electoral performance ===
West Bengal Legislative Assembly
Year	Constituency	Party	Votes	%	Opponent	Party	Votes	%	Margin	Result
2026	Tarakeswar	BJP	116,901	52.76	Ramendu Sinharay	AITC	85,902	38.77	30,999	Won

== Controversy ==
Pan, was arrested in Sandeshkhali while reporting live, following a local woman's complaint alleging trespassing, assault, and violation of privacy. While Pan and his channel claim the arrest is a targeted move to suppress his reporting, a Basirhat court remanded him to three days of police custody. The incident has drawn sharp criticism from opposition leaders and media bodies—including the Editors Guild of India and the Kolkata Press Club—who have raised concerns over press freedom and demanded a fair investigation.
