= Marxist Forward Bloc =

- Founder: Satyapriya Banerjee
- Founded: 12 November 1953; 72 years ago
- Split from: All India Forward Bloc
- Ideology: Marxism; Left-wing populism
- Political position: Left-wing
- Colours: Red
- Alliance: Left Front

The Marxist Forward Bloc is a political party in India, a splinter group of the All India Forward Bloc. The MFB was formed in 1953 as Satyapriya Banerjee, a member of the AIFB Central Secretariat, Amar Bose, Suhurit Chaudhury and Ram Chatterjee were expelled from AIFB. At its foundation, Satyapriya Banerjee was the party's general secretary and Amar Bose its chairman.

The MFB is part of the Left Front and has been associated with the combined left movement since its inception. Its leader Ram Chatterjee was a minister in the West Bengal Left Front government for several years. Later the MFB was led by Pratim Chatterjee, who served in the West Bengal government as Minister of Fire Services in the Left Front cabinet. Chatterjee represented the Tarakeswar seat from 1996 in the West Bengal Legislative Assembly till 2011, when he lost to Rachhpal Singh of the TMC.

In West Bengal Assembly elections till 2011, the MFB contested the seats for Tarakeswar in Hooghly district and Jamalpur in East Burdwan district as a Left Front partner. In the 2006 West Bengal Legislative Assembly election, the party retained both seats as Pratim Chatterjee and Samar Hazra won with good margins. Later in the 2011 election the party lost its representation in the Legislative Assembly when both of the sitting MLAs lost from their respective constituencies. In 2016 assembly election, Samar Hazra again contested from Jamalpur constituency on CPI(M) ticket and retained the seat. Later he lost the seat in 2021 assembly election.

In the Kolkata municipal polls in 2005, the MFB contested two wards as a Left Front partner. Biren Chakroborty, the secretary of the MFB, was elected from ward number 57.

In the 2008 Panchayet polls, the MFB won seats in Panchayet, Panchayet Samity and ZP levels in Hoogly and Burdwan districts.

In the 2010 municipal polls, the MFB lost its seat in Kolkata corporation. It won a seat each at Rampurhat in Birbhum and Arambagh in Hooghly.
