= Mustafizur Rahaman (politician, born 1981) =

Indian politician (born 1981)

Member of the West Bengal Legislative Assembly
- Incumbent
- Assumed office 2026
- Preceded by: Humayun Kabir
- Constituency: Bharatpur

Personal details
- Born: 1981 (age 44–45)
- Party: All India Trinamool Congress (until 2026); Democratic Trinamool Congress (from 2026)
- Profession: Politician

Mustafizur Rahaman (born 1981) is an Indian politician from West Bengal. He is a member of the West Bengal Legislative Assembly from Bharatpur representing the Democratic Trinamool Congress.

== Early life and education ==
Rahaman is the son of Abdul Hai. He is engaged in business activities. He passed Class 10 examination from Salar E.Z.H. School under the West Bengal Board of Secondary Education in 1998.

== Political career ==
Rahaman won the Bharatpur seat in the 2026 West Bengal Legislative Assembly election as a candidate of the All India Trinamool Congress. He received 90,870 votes and defeated Anamika Ghosh of the Bharatiya Janata Party by a margin of 30,753 votes.
