= Arun Halder =

Indian politician (born 1968)

Arun Halder (born 1968) is an Indian politician from West Bengal. He is a member of West Bengal Legislative Assembly from the Jamalpur Assembly constituency, which is reserved for Scheduled Caste community, in Purba Bardhaman district representing the Bharatiya Janata Party.

== Early life ==
Halder is from Panihati, Purba Bardhaman district, West Bengal. He is the son of Adhir Ranjan Halder. He completed his BA at a college affiliated with Calcutta University in 1991. He is self employed. He declared assets worth Rs.3.3 crore in his affidavit to the Election Commission of India.

== Career ==
Halder won the Jamalpur Assembly constituency representing the Bharatiya Janata Party in the 2026 West Bengal Legislative Assembly election. He polled 99,936 votes and defeated his closest opponent, Bhootnath Mallick of the All India Trinamool Congress (AITC), by a margin of 11,178 votes.
