= Sahina Mumtaz Begum =

Indian politician

Sahina Mumtaz Begum সাহিনা মুমতাজ বেগম

Member of the West Bengal Legislative Assembly
- In office 23 May 2019 – 04 may 2026
- Preceded by: Abu Taher Khan
- Succeeded by: Humayun Kabir
- Constituency: Naoda

Personal details
- Party: Trinamool Congress
- Relatives: Nasiruddin Khan (father-in-law)

Sahina Mumtaz Begum is an Indian politician. In 2019 she was elected as MLA of Naoda Vidhan Sabha Constituency in West Bengal Legislative Assembly. She is a politician from Trinamool Congress. She is Nasiruddin Khan's daughter-in-law.
