= Nasiruddin Khan =

Indian politician

Minister of Agriculture, Government of West Bengal
- In office 2 April 1971 – 28 June 1971

Member of West Bengal Legislative Assembly
- In office 1969–1977
- Preceded by: Mohammad Israil
- Succeeded by: Jayanta Kumar Biswas
- Constituency: Naoda
- In office 1991–1996
- Preceded by: Jayanta Kumar Biswas
- Succeeded by: Jayanta Kumar Biswas
- Constituency: Naoda

Personal details
- Born: c. 1931
- Died: 10 October 2018 (aged 87)
- Political party: Trinamool Congress (2001–2018); Indian National Congress (1991–2001); Indian Union Muslim League (1972–1991)
- Relatives: Sahina Mumtaz Begum (daughter-in-law)

Nasiruddin Khan (c. 1948 – 10 October 2018) was an Indian politician from West Bengal belonging to Trinamool Congress. He was a member of West Bengal Legislative Assembly. He was a minister of the Government of West Bengal too. His daughter-in-law Sahina Mumtaz Begum is the incumbent legislator of Naoda. He was known by the name of Montu Khan.

== Biography ==
Khan was elected four times as a legislator of the West Bengal Legislative Assembly. He was elected from Naoda in 1969 as a Progressive Muslim League candidate. He was elected from Naoda as an independent candidate in 1971. He was appointed the Agriculture Minister of West Bengal in 1971. In 1972 he was elected from Naoda as an Indian Union Muslim League candidate. In 1991 he was elected from Naoda as an Indian National Congress candidate. He joined Trinamool Congress in 2001.

Khan died on 3 October 2018 at the age of 87.
