= Id Mohammad =

Indian politician

Saikh Id Mohammad (born 1952 or 1953) is an Indian politician from West Bengal. He is a five time consecutive member of the West Bengal Legislative Assembly from the Bharatpur, West Bengal Assembly constituency in Murshidabad district.

== Early life and education ==
Mohammad is from Bharatpur, Murshidabad North 24 Parganas district, West Bengal. He is the son of late Ulauddin. He completed his BSc in 1972 at Katwa College, which is affiliated with Burdwan University. His wife is a teacher at Madrasha Siksha Kendra.

== Career ==
Mohammad became an MLA for the first time winning from Bharatpur, West Bengal Assembly constituency, representing the Revolutionary Socialist Party in the 1991 West Bengal Legislative Assembly election. He retained the seat for the Socialist Party in the 1996 West Bengal Legislative Assembly election and won for a third time in the 2001 West Bengal Legislative Assembly election. He won again in 2006 election and made it a fifth time in a row winning the 2011 West Bengal Legislative Assembly election. He lost to Kamalesh Chatterjee of the Indian National Congress in the 2016 election. In 2011, he polled 70,658 votes and defeated his nearest rival, Daliya Begum of the Indian National Congress, by a margin of 1,929 votes.
