= Humayun Kabir (AJUP politician) =

Indian politician from West Bengal (born 1963)

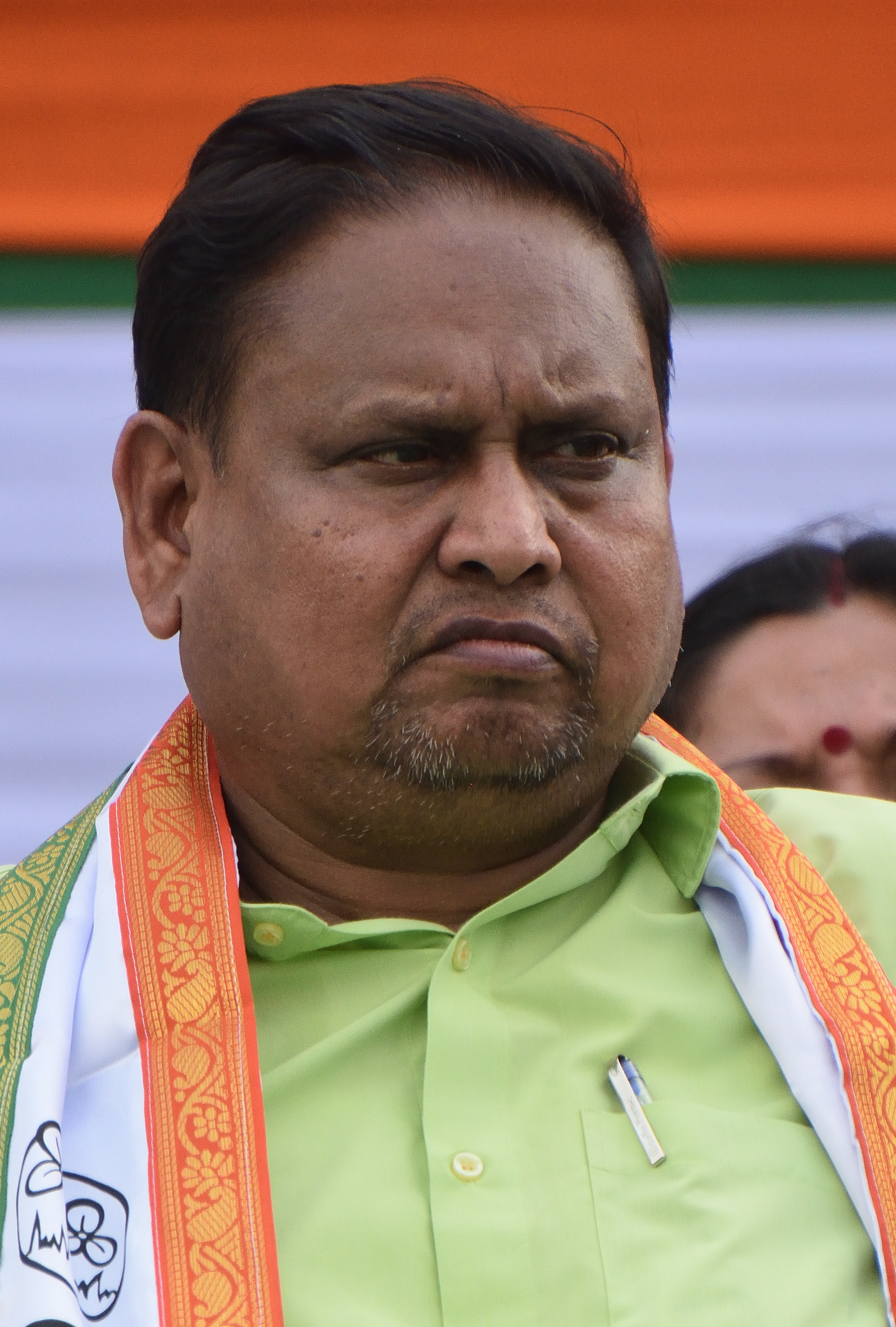
- Humayun Kabir in 2023

President of the Aam Janata Unnayan Party
- Incumbent
- Assumed office 22 December 2025
- Preceded by: Position established

Member of the West Bengal Legislative Assembly
- Incumbent
- Assumed office 4 May 2026
- Preceded by: Sahina Mumtaz Begum
- Constituency: Naoda
- In office 7 May 2021 – 4 May 2026
- Preceded by: Kamalesh Chatterjee
- Succeeded by: Mustafizur Rahaman
- Constituency: Bharatpur

Minister of State (Independent Charge) Government of West Bengal
- In office 21 November 2012 – 19 May 2013
- Chief Minister: Mamata Banerjee
- Department: Animal Resources Development
- Succeeded by: Rajesh Mahata

Personal details
- Born: 3 January 1963 (age 63) Narkelbari, Murshidabad district, West Bengal, India
- Party: Aam Janata Unnayan Party
- Other political affiliations: Indian National Congress (until 2012); Trinamool Congress (2012–2016, 2020–2025); Independent (2016–2018); Bharatiya Janata Party (2018–2020)
- Spouse: Mira Sultana
- Children: 2

Humayun Kabir (born 3 January 1963) is an Indian politician from West Bengal. He is the president of the Aam Janata Unnayan Party (AJUP) and a member of the West Bengal Legislative Assembly from the Naoda Assembly constituency. He was elected to the assembly from both Naoda and Rejinagar in the 2026 West Bengal Legislative Assembly election. He subsequently vacated the Rejinagar seat while retaining Naoda.

Kabir previously represented Rejinagar as a member of the Indian National Congress and later served as Minister of State with independent charge of Animal Resources Development in the First Banerjee ministry. He subsequently contested elections as a Trinamool Congress candidate, an independent candidate and a Bharatiya Janata Party candidate, before returning to the Trinamool Congress and winning the Bharatpur seat in 2021.

== Political career ==
=== Congress and Trinamool Congress ===
Kabir entered electoral politics as a candidate of the Indian National Congress. In the 2011 West Bengal Legislative Assembly election, he was elected from Rejinagar, a constituency created in the 2011 delimitation.

In 2012, Kabir resigned from the Congress and joined the Trinamool Congress. He was appointed Minister of State for Animal Resources Development with independent charge in the West Bengal government on 21 November 2012.

The Rejinagar seat became vacant following his change of party, and a by-election was held in February 2013. Kabir contested the by-election as a Trinamool Congress candidate but lost to Congress candidate Rabiul Alam Chowdhury. Kabir subsequently resigned from the state ministry on 19 May 2013.

In February 2015, the Trinamool Congress expelled Kabir over what the party described as anti-party activities. He contested the 2016 Assembly election from Rejinagar as an independent candidate but lost to Rabiul Alam Chowdhury.

=== Bharatiya Janata Party and return to Trinamool Congress ===
Kabir joined the Bharatiya Janata Party in 2018 and contested the 2019 Indian general election from the Murshidabad Lok Sabha constituency. He was not elected.

Kabir returned to the Trinamool Congress in 2020 and won the Bharatpur seat in the 2021 West Bengal Legislative Assembly election, defeating Bharatiya Janata Party candidate Iman Kalyan Mukherjee.

=== Aam Janata Unnayan Party ===
In December 2025, the Trinamool Congress suspended Kabir after he announced plans for a mosque modelled on the Babri Masjid in Murshidabad. Kabir subsequently proceeded with a foundation-stone ceremony on 6 December 2025.

On 22 December 2025, Kabir launched the Aam Janata Unnayan Party and became its president.

== 2026 West Bengal Legislative Assembly election ==
Kabir contested the 2026 West Bengal Legislative Assembly election as an Aam Janata Unnayan Party candidate from both Rejinagar and Naoda. He won both constituencies.

In Rejinagar, Kabir received 123,536 votes, defeating Bharatiya Janata Party candidate Bapan Ghosh by 58,876 votes. In Naoda, he received 86,463 votes and defeated Bharatiya Janata Party candidate Rana Mandal by 27,943 votes.

Kabir subsequently vacated the Rejinagar seat and retained Naoda. The Election Commission of India scheduled a by-election for Rejinagar for 6 October 2026, with counting scheduled for 9 October.

BJP candidate Shankharavh Sarkar defeated Kabir's son, Golam Nabi Azad (AJUP), in the October by-election.

== Legal proceedings ==
In 2026, a case was registered against Kabir at Rejinagar Police Station under several provisions of the Bharatiya Nyaya Sanhita in connection with remarks made at a public meeting. On 10 September 2026, the Calcutta High Court granted him anticipatory bail. The court held that it did not find, even prima facie, the ingredients of the offence under section 152 of the BNS and noted that custodial interrogation was not necessary.

== Electoral performance ==
=== Lok Sabha ===
Year	Constituency	Party	Votes	%	Opponent	Party	Votes	%	Result	Margin	%
2019	Murshidabad	BJP	2,47,809	17.05	Abu Taher Khan	AITC	6,04,346	41.57	Lost	-3,56,537	-24.52

=== Legislative Assembly ===
Year	Constituency	Party	Votes	%	Opponent	Party	Votes	%	Result	Margin	%
2026	Rejinagar	AJUP	1,23,536	51.62	Bapan Ghosh	BJP	64,660	27.02	Won	+58,876	+24.60
2026	Naoda	AJUP	86,463	39.02	Rana Mondal	BJP	58,520	26.41	Won	+27,943	+12.61
2021	Bharatpur	AITC	96,226	50.90	Iman Kalyan Mukherjee	BJP	53,143	28.11	Won	+43,083	+22.79
2016	Rejinagar	IND	74,210	40.12	Rabiul Alam Chowdhury	INC	79,770	43.12	Lost	-5,560	-3.00
2013 (Note: By-Election)	Rejinagar	AITC	40,911	23.90	Rabiul Alam Chowdhury	INC	66,876	39.08	Lost	-25,965	-15.18
2011	Rejinagar	INC	77,542	49.74	Sirajul Islam Mondal	RSP	68,781	44.12	Won	+8,761	+5.62
