= Rachhpal Singh =

Indian politician (1942–2021)

Rachhpal Singh IPS (Retd.)

Member of West Bengal Legislative Assembly
- In office 21 November 2011 – 29 April 2021
- Succeeded by: Ramendu Sinharay
- Constituency: Tarakeswar

Personal details
- Born: 2 October 1942
- Died: 8 July 2021 (aged 78) Kolkata, West Bengal, India
- Party: Trinamool Congress
- Children: 2

Rachhpal Singh (2 October 1942– 8 July 2021) was an Indian politician who served as Minister for Planning in the Government of West Bengal. He was also a MLA, elected from the Tarakeswar constituency in the 2011 West Bengal state assembly election.

Singh died from COVID-19 in 2021.
