= Aam Janata Unnayan Party =

Political party in West Bengal, India

- Abbreviation: AJUP
- President: Humayun Kabir
- General Secretary: Yasir Haider
- Founder: Humayun Kabir
- Founded: 22 December 2025; 9 months ago
- Split from: Trinamool Congress
- Headquarters: Narikelbari, Sompara, Saktipur, Murshidabad, 742163, West Bengal, India
- Ideology: Secularism; Social justice Bengali Muslim minority rights
- Colours: Green
- ECI status: Registered Unrecognised Party
- Seats in West Bengal Legislative Assembly: 1 / 294

Election symbol
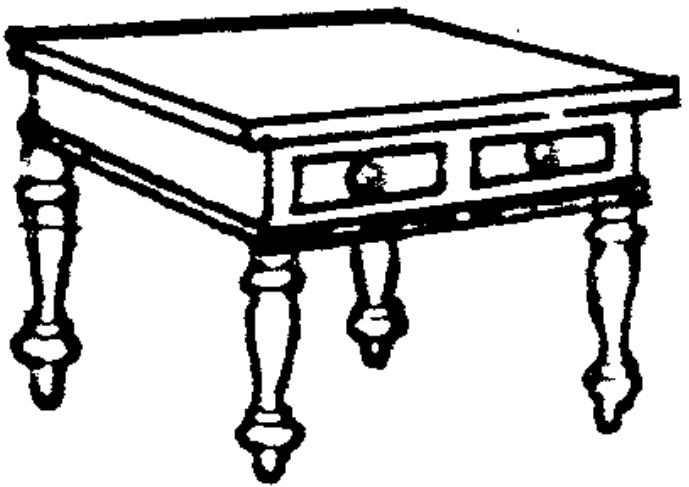

Party flag

Website
- https://ajup.net/

The Aam Janata Unnayan Party (AJUP) is a regional political party in the Indian state of West Bengal. The party was founded by Humayun Kabir on 22 December 2025.

The party was formed following Kabir's suspension from the All India Trinamool Congress. According to its leadership, the Janata Unnayan Party aims to represent grassroots interests, with a focus on Muslim rights and Muslim justice. The party contested the 2026 West Bengal Legislative Assembly election with the 'Whistle' symbol and its founder Humayur Kabir contesting from two constituencies, the Naoda Assembly constituency and Rejinagar Assembly constituency. He won both the seats in Murshidabad district.

On 4 June 2026, he said he would resign the Rejinagar seat and offer Mamata Banerjee a way back to the Assembly, if she wants to contest Kabir's stronghold district with a majority of Muslim population.

== History and formation ==
The party was officially launched at a mass rally at the Khagrupara intersection in Beldanga, Murshidabad. The formation was preceded by weeks of tension between Kabir and the TMC leadership, culminating in his suspension on December 4, 2025. The flashpoint was Kabir's controversial decision to lay the foundation stone for a "Babri-style mosque" in Rejinagar on December 6, a move aimed at consolidating Muslim support which the TMC viewed as divisive, due to the presence of the Bharatiya Janata Party as the main opposition party in the state.
