= 2022 West Bengal municipal elections =

Election to West Bengal municipalities in 2022

- 27 February and 26 June 2022 (for remaining 5 wards)

All 108 municipalities in West Bengal
- Turnout: 76.5%
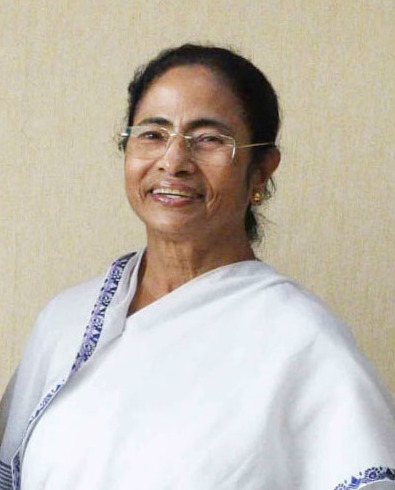

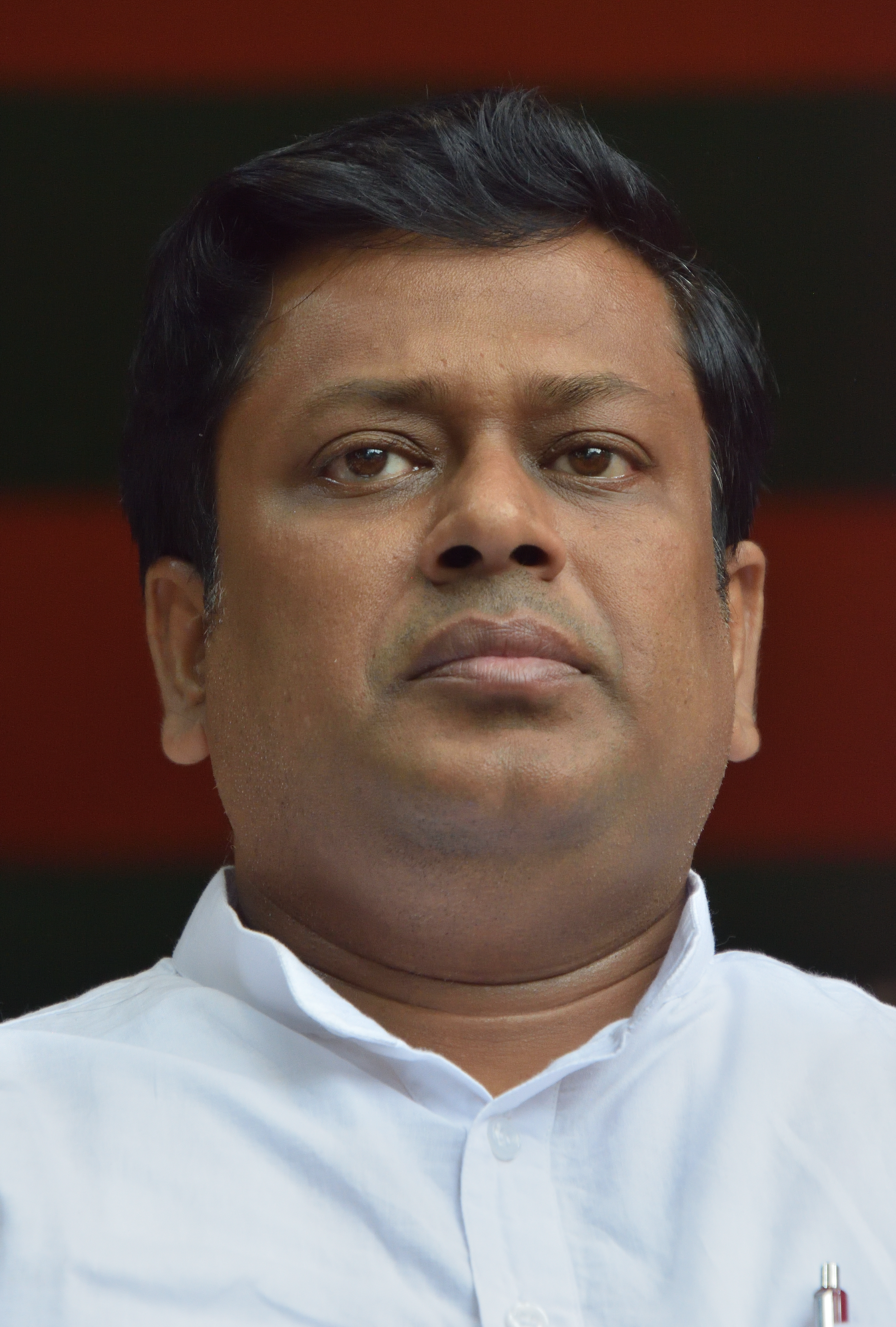

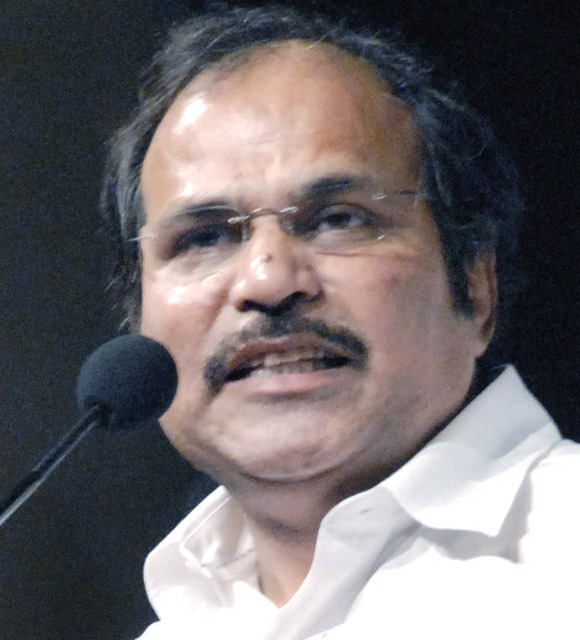

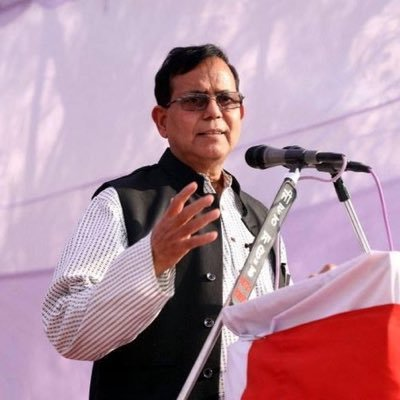
	First party	Second party
Leader	Mamata Banerjee	Sukanta Majumdar
Party	AITC	BJP
Alliance	AITC+	NDA
Leader since	1 January 1998	20 September 2021
Seats won	1,977 (Note: AITC won 105 wards uncontested)	63
Percentage	63%	13%
	Third party	Fourth party
Leader	Adhir Ranjan Chowdhury	Mohammed Salim
Party	INC	CPI(M)
Alliance	UPA	LF
Leader since	9 September 2020	16 March 2022
Seats won	59	56
Percentage	5%	14%

Municipal elections was held in West Bengal on 27 February 2022 to elect members of all 108 municipalities in the state. The election to four remaining wards were held in 26 June.

The Trinamool Congress had won overwhelming majority of 103 municipalities out of 108. The CPI(M) had won 1 municipal body. The BJP which was the largest opposition party in 2021 West Bengal Legislative Assembly election failed to win a single municipality but came second.

== Schedule ==
Poll event	Schedule
Notification date	3 February 2022
Last Date for filing nomination	9 February 2022
Last Date for withdrawal of nomination	12 February 2022
Date of poll	27 February 2022
Date of counting of votes	2 March 2022

== Parties and alliances ==
Alliance	Party	Symbol
AITC+	Trinamool Congress (AITC)	
AITC+	Gorkha Janmukti Morcha (GJM)	
NDA	Bharatiya Janata Party (BJP)	
LF	Communist Party of India (Marxist) (CPI(M))	
LF	All India Forward Bloc (AIFB)	
LF	Communist Party of India (CPI)	
LF	Revolutionary Socialist Party (RSP)	
UPA	Indian National Congress (INC)	
Others	Hamro Party (HP)	
Others	Independents (IND)	

== Results ==
=== Partywise result ===
Vote share by Party
1. AITC (63.0%)
2. LF (14.0%)
3. BJP (13.0%)
4. INC (5.00%)
5. Others (5.00%)

The ruling party in the state, Trinamool Congress, had a landslide victory by winning 102 out of 108 municipalities. The CPI(M) and newly formed Hamro Party were successful to win Taherpur and Darjeeling Municipality respectively. The results of the remaining four bodies were found hung which were later won by AITC with the support of independent candidates.

Following is a list of performances of the contested political parties and alliances:

Alliance	Party	Symbol	Municipalities won	Wards won		% of votes
AITC+	Trinamool Congress (AITC)		102	1977 (Note: AITC won 105 wards uncontested)	1980	63
AITC+	Gorkha Janmukti Morcha (GJM)		0	3	1980	63
NDA	Bharatiya Janata Party (BJP)		0	63		13
UPA	Indian National Congress (INC)		0	59		5
LF	Communist Party of India (Marxist) (CPI(M))		1 (Note: The CPI(M) won the Taherpur Notified Area Authority under Nadia district with a simple majority.)	48	56	14
LF	All India Forward Bloc (AIFB)		1	4	56	14
LF	Communist Party of India (CPI)		1	3	56	14
LF	Revolutionary Socialist Party (RSP)		1	1	56	14
Others	Hamro Party (HP)		1 (Note: The Hamro Party won the Darjeeling Municipality under Darjeeling district with a simple majority.)	18		1
Others	Independents (IND)		0	100		4
Total			108 (4 Hung)	2,276		100

=== Corporation wise result ===
Municipal Corporation election data published by State Election Commission of West Bengal

No.	District	Municipal Corporation	Total Wards						Winner
No.	District	Municipal Corporation	Total Wards	AITC	BJP	LF	INC	Others	Winner
1	Paschim Bardhaman	Asansol Municipal Corporation	106	91	7	2	3	3	AITC
2	North 24 Parganas	Bidhannagar Municipal Corporation	41	39	0	0	1	1	AITC
3	Hooghly	Chandannagar Municipal Corporation	33	31	0	2	0	0	AITC
4	Darjeeling, Jalpaiguri	Siliguri Municipal Corporation	47	37	5	4	1	0	AITC
Total			227	198	12	8	5	4	

=== Municipality wise result ===
Municipality election data published by State Election Commission of West Bengal

Division	No.	District	Municipality	Total Wards						Winner
Division	No.	District	Municipality	Total Wards	AITC	BJP	LF	INC	Others	Winner
North Bengal	1	Alipurduar	Alipurduar Municipality	20	16	0	0	1	3	AITC
North Bengal	2	Alipurduar	Falakata Municipality	18	18	0	0	0	0	AITC
North Bengal	Total of Alipurduar district			38	34	0	0	1	3	
North Bengal	3	Cooch Behar	Cooch Behar Municipality	20	15	0	3	0	2	AITC
North Bengal	4	Cooch Behar	Dinhata Municipality	16	16 (Note: AITC won all wards uncontested)	0	0	0	0	AITC
North Bengal	5	Cooch Behar	Haldibari Municipality	11	11 (Note: AITC won two wards uncontested)	0	0	0	0	AITC
North Bengal	6	Cooch Behar	Mekliganj Municipality	9	9	0	0	0	0	AITC
North Bengal	7	Cooch Behar	Mathabhanga Municipality	12	12	0	0	0	0	AITC
North Bengal	8	Cooch Behar	Tufanganj Municipality	12	12	0	0	0	0	AITC
North Bengal	Total of Cooch Behar district			80	75	0	3	0	2	
North Bengal	9	Jalpaiguri	Jalpaiguri Municipality	25	22	0	1	2	0	AITC
North Bengal	10	Jalpaiguri	Mal Municipality	15	14	1	0	0	0	AITC
North Bengal	11	Jalpaiguri	Maynaguri Municipality	17	16	0	0	0	1	AITC
North Bengal	Total of Jalpaiguri district			57	52	1	1	2	1	
North Bengal	12	Darjeeling	Darjeeling Municipality	32	2	0	0	0	30 (Note: This figure includes 27 Independents & 3 Others)	HP
North Bengal	Total of Darjeeling district			32	2	0	0	0	30	
North Bengal	13	Uttar Dinajpur	Islampur Municipality	17	11 (Note: AITC won one ward uncontested)	2	1	0	3	AITC
North Bengal	14	Uttar Dinajpur	Dalkhola Municipality	16	12	0	0	0	4	AITC
North Bengal	15	Uttar Dinajpur	Kaliaganj Municipality	17	10	6	0	0	1	AITC
North Bengal	Total of Uttar Dinajpur district			50	33	8	1	0	8	
North Bengal	16	Dakshin Dinajpur	Gangarampur Municipality	18	18	0	0	0	0	AITC
North Bengal	17	Dakshin Dinajpur	Balurghat Municipality	25	23	0	2 (Note: CPI(M) and RSP won one ward each)	0	0	AITC
North Bengal	Total of Dakshin Dinajpur district			43	41	0	2	0	0	
North Bengal	18	Malda	English Bazar Municipality	29	25	3	0	0	1	AITC
North Bengal	19	Malda	Old Malda Municipality	20	17	2	0	0	1	AITC
North Bengal	Total of Malda district			49	42	5	0	0	2	
Total of North Bengal division				349	279	14	7	3	46	
Presidency	20	Murshidabad	Jangipur Municipality	21	15	1	3	2	0	AITC
Presidency	21	Murshidabad	Dhulian Municipality	21	11	0	0	7	3	AITC
Presidency	22	Murshidabad	Kandi Municipality	18	16	0	0	0	2	AITC
Presidency	23	Murshidabad	Murshidbad Sadar Municipality	16	9	6	0	0	1	AITC
Presidency	24	Murshidabad	Jiaganj–Azimganj Municipality	17	15	0	0	0	2	AITC
Presidency	25	Murshidabad	Baharampur Municipality	28	22	0	0	6	0	AITC
Presidency	26	Murshidabad	Beldanga Municipality	14	7	3	0	0	4	HUNG
Presidency	Total of Murshidabad district			135	95	10	3	15	12	
Presidency	27	Nadia	Nabadwip Municipality	24	24	0	0	0	0	AITC
Presidency	28	Nadia	Krishnanagar Municipality	25	16	1	0	4	4	AITC
Presidency	29	Nadia	Ranaghat Municipality	20	19	1	0	0	0	AITC
Presidency	30	Nadia	Taherpur Notified Area Authority	13	5	0	8	0	0	CPI(M)
Presidency	31	Nadia	Santipur Municipality	24	22	2	0	0	0	AITC
Presidency	32	Nadia	Birnagar Municipality	14	11	1	0	0	2	AITC
Presidency	33	Nadia	Kalyani Municipality	21	21	0	0	0	0	AITC
Presidency	34	Nadia	Haringhata Municipality	17	17	0	0	0	0	AITC
Presidency	35	Nadia	Chakdaha Municipality	21	21	0	0	0	0	AITC
Presidency	36	Nadia	Gayespur Municipality	18	18	0	0	0	0	AITC
Presidency	Total of Nadia district			197	174	5	8	4	6	
Presidency	37	North 24 Parganas	Barasat Municipality	35	30	0	3 (Note: 2 wards were won by CPI(M) and one was won by CPI)	0	2	AITC
Presidency	38	North 24 Parganas	Ashoknagar–Kalyangarh Municipality	23	20	0	2	1	0	AITC
Presidency	39	North 24 Parganas	Gobardanga Municipality	17	15	0	1	0	1	AITC
Presidency	40	North 24 Parganas	Habra Municipality	24	24	0	0	0	0	AITC
Presidency	41	North 24 Parganas	Madhyamgram Municipality	28	24	0	4 (Note: 2 wards each were won by AIFB & CPI(M))	0	0	AITC
Presidency	42	North 24 Parganas	Barrackpore Municipality	24	24	0	0	0	0	AITC
Presidency	43	North 24 Parganas	Bhatpara Municipality	35	35 (Note: AITC won 3 wards uncontested)	0	0	0	0	AITC
Presidency	44	North 24 Parganas	North Dum Dum Municipality	34	33	0	1	0	0	AITC
Presidency	45	North 24 Parganas	South Dum Dum Municipality	34	32	0	0	0	2	AITC
Presidency	46	North 24 Parganas	Khardaha Municipality	22	21	0	0	0	1	AITC
Presidency	47	North 24 Parganas	New Barrackpore Municipality	20	19	0	1	0	0	AITC
Presidency	48	North 24 Parganas	Titagarh Municipality	23	23 (Note: AITC won 1 ward uncontested)	0	0	0	0	AITC
Presidency	49	North 24 Parganas	Halisahar Municipality	23	23 (Note: AITC won 1 ward uncontested)	0	0	0	0	AITC
Presidency	50	North 24 Parganas	Garulia Municipality	21	19	0	1 (Note: AIFB won 1 ward)	0	1	AITC
Presidency	51	North 24 Parganas	Dum Dum Municipality	22	22 (Note: AITC won 1 ward uncontested)	0	0	0	0	AITC
Presidency	52	North 24 Parganas	Kanchrapara Municipality	24	24	0	0	0	0	AITC
Presidency	53	North 24 Parganas	Baranagar Municipality	34	32 (Note: AITC won 1 ward uncontested)	0	2	0	0	AITC
Presidency	54	North 24 Parganas	Kamarhati Municipality	35	31	0	1	0	3	AITC
Presidency	55	North 24 Parganas	Naihati Municipality	31	31	0	0	0	0	AITC
Presidency	56	North 24 Parganas	Panihati Municipality	35	33	0	1	1	0	AITC
Presidency	57	North 24 Parganas	North Barrackpore Municipality	23	23	0	0	0	0	AITC
Presidency	58	North 24 Parganas	Baduria Municipality	17	15 (Note: AITC won 1 ward uncontested)	0	0	0	2	AITC
Presidency	59	North 24 Parganas	Taki Municipality	16	14 (Note: AITC won 6 wards uncontested)	2	0	0	4	AITC
Presidency	60	North 24 Parganas	Basirhat Municipality	23	21	1	0	1	0	AITC
Presidency	61	North 24 Parganas	Bongaon Municipality	22	19	1	0	1	1	AITC
Presidency	Total of North 24 Parganas district			645	607	4	17	4	13	
Presidency	62	South 24 Parganas	Baruipur Municipality	17	17	0	0	0	0	AITC
Presidency	63	South 24 Parganas	Rajpur–Sonarpur Municipality	35	33	0	1	0	1	AITC
Presidency	64	South 24 Parganas	Joynagar–Majilpur Municipality	14	12	0	0	1	1	AITC
Presidency	65	South 24 Parganas	Diamond Harbour Municipality	16	16	0	0	0	0	AITC
Presidency	66	South 24 Parganas	Maheshtala Municipality	35	34	0	0	1	0	AITC
Presidency	67	South 24 Parganas	Budge Budge Municipality	20	20 (Note: AITC won 18 wards uncontested)	0	0	0	0	AITC
Presidency	Total of South 24 Parganas district			137	132	0	1	2	2	
Presidency	68	Howrah	Uluberia Municipality	32	28	1	1	1	1	AITC
Presidency	Total of Howrah district			32	28	1	1	1	1	
Total of Presidency division				1,146	1,036	20	30	26	34	
Bardhaman	69	Hooghly	Arambagh Municipality	19	18	1	0	0	0	AITC
Bardhaman	70	Hooghly	Hooghly–Chunchura Municipality	30	29	0	1	0	0	AITC
Bardhaman	71	Hooghly	Bansberia Municipality	22	21	0	1	0	0	AITC
Bardhaman	72	Hooghly	Uttarpara Municipality	24	19	0	3	1	1	AITC
Bardhaman	73	Hooghly	Konnagar Municipality	20	17	0	1	1	1	AITC
Bardhaman	74	Hooghly	Sreerampur Municipality	29	25	0	1	1	2	AITC
Bardhaman	75	Hooghly	Baidyabati Municipality	23	16	0	2 (Note: One ward each won by AIFB and CPI(M))	2	3	AITC
Bardhaman	76	Hooghly	Rishra Municipality	23	19	2	0	1	1	AITC
Bardhaman	77	Hooghly	Dankuni Municipality	21	19	0	0	1	1	AITC
Bardhaman	78	Hooghly	Tarakeswar Municipality	15	15	0	0	0	0	AITC
Bardhaman	79	Hooghly	Bhadreswar Municipality	22	20	1	0	0	1	AITC
Bardhaman	80	Hooghly	Champdani Municipality	22	11	0	0	1	10	HUNG
Bardhaman	Total of Hooghly district			270	229	4	9	8	20	
Bardhaman	81	Purba Bardhaman	Memari Municipality	16	15	0	0	1	0	AITC
Bardhaman	82	Purba Bardhaman	Katwa Municipality	20	15	0	0	4	1	AITC
Bardhaman	83	Purba Bardhaman	Dainhat Municipality	14	14	0	0	0	0	AITC
Bardhaman	84	Purba Bardhaman	Bardhaman Municipality	35	35	0	0	0	0	AITC
Bardhaman	85	Purba Bardhaman	Guskhara Municipality	16	16	0	0	0	0	AITC
Bardhaman	86	Purba Bardhaman	Kalna Municipality	18	17	0	1	0	0	AITC
Bardhaman	Total of Purba Bardhaman district			119	112	0	1	5	1	
Bardhaman	87	Birbhum	Bolpur Municipality	22	22 (Note: AITC won 10 wards uncontested)	0	0	0	0	AITC
Bardhaman	88	Birbhum	Suri Municipality	21	21 (Note: AITC won 16 wards uncontested)	0	0	0	0	AITC
Bardhaman	89	Birbhum	Sainthia Municipality	16	16 (Note: AITC won 14 wards uncontested)	0	0	0	0	AITC
Bardhaman	90	Birbhum	Dubrajpur Municipality	16	16 (Note: AITC won 5 wards uncontested)	0	0	0	0	AITC
Bardhaman	91	Birbhum	Rampurhat Municipality	18	17 (Note: AITC won 5 wards uncontested)	0	1	0	0	AITC
Bardhaman	Total of Birbhum district			93	92	0	1	0	0	
Total of Bardhaman division				482	433	4	11	13	21	
Junglemahal	92	Purulia	Purulia Municipality	23	17	3	0	1	2	AITC
Junglemahal	93	Purulia	Raghunathpur Municipality	13	9	2	0	2	0	AITC
Junglemahal	94	Purulia	Jhalda Municipality	12	5	0	0	5	2	HUNG
Junglemahal	Total of Purulia district			48	31	5	0	8	4	
Junglemahal	95	Jhargram	Jhargram Municipality	18	16	0	1 (Note: One ward won by CPI)	0	1	AITC
Junglemahal	Total of Jhargram district			18	16	0	1	0	1	
Junglemahal	96	Bankura	Bankura Municipality	24	21	0	0	0	3	AITC
Junglemahal	97	Bankura	Bishnupur Municipality	19	13	2	0	1	3	AITC
Junglemahal	98	Bankura	Sonamukhi Municipality	15	9	0	2	0	4	AITC
Junglemahal	Total of Bankura district			58	43	2	2	1	10	
Junglemahal	99	Paschim Medinipur	Medinipur Municipality	25	20	0	3	1	1	AITC
Junglemahal	100	Paschim Medinipur	Ramjibanpur Municipality	11	11	0	0	0	0	AITC
Junglemahal	101	Paschim Medinipur	Chandrakona Municipality	12	12	0	0	0	0	AITC
Junglemahal	102	Paschim Medinipur	Khirpai Municipality	10	9	0	0	0	1	AITC
Junglemahal	103	Paschim Medinipur	Ghatal Municipality	17	17	0	0	0	0	AITC
Junglemahal	104	Paschim Medinipur	Kharar Municipality	10	8	2	0	0	0	AITC
Junglemahal	105	Paschim Medinipur	Kharagpur Municipality	35	20	6	2 (Note: One ward won each by CPI & CPI(M))	6	1	AITC
Junglemahal	Total of Paschim Medinipur district			120	97	8	5	7	3	
Junglemahal	106	Purba Medinipur	Tamralipta Municipality	20	18	2	0	0	0	AITC
Junglemahal	107	Purba Medinipur	Kanthi Municipality	21	17	3	0	0	1	AITC
Junglemahal	108	Purba Medinipur	Egra Municipality	14	7	5	0	1	1	HUNG
Junglemahal	Total of Purba Medinipur district			55	42	10	0	1	2	
Total of Junglemahal division				299	229	25	8	17	20	
Grand Total				2,276	1,977 (Note: This includes 105 wards AITC won uncontested)	63	56	59	121 (Note: This includes 3 wards won by AITC ally GJM and 18 wards won by the Hamro Party.)	

== 2022–2027 bypolls ==
The results of the by election six ward is :

Date	District	Body	Ward	Won Party	Runner Up Party	Margin
June 26	North 24 Parganas	Bhatpara Munucipality	3	AITC	CPI(M)	1171
June 26	North 24 Parganas	South Dum Dum Municipality	29	AITC	BJP	9532
June 26	North 24 Parganas	Dumdum municipality	4	AITC	CPI(M)	2747
June 26	North 24 Parganas	Panihati Municipality	8	AITC	CPI(M)	2273
June 26	Purulia	Jhalda Municipality	2	INC	AITC	778
Aug 21	North 24 Pargana	Bongaon Municipality	14	AITC	BJP	2118
