= Shivendra Bijoy Malla Deb =

Indian politician

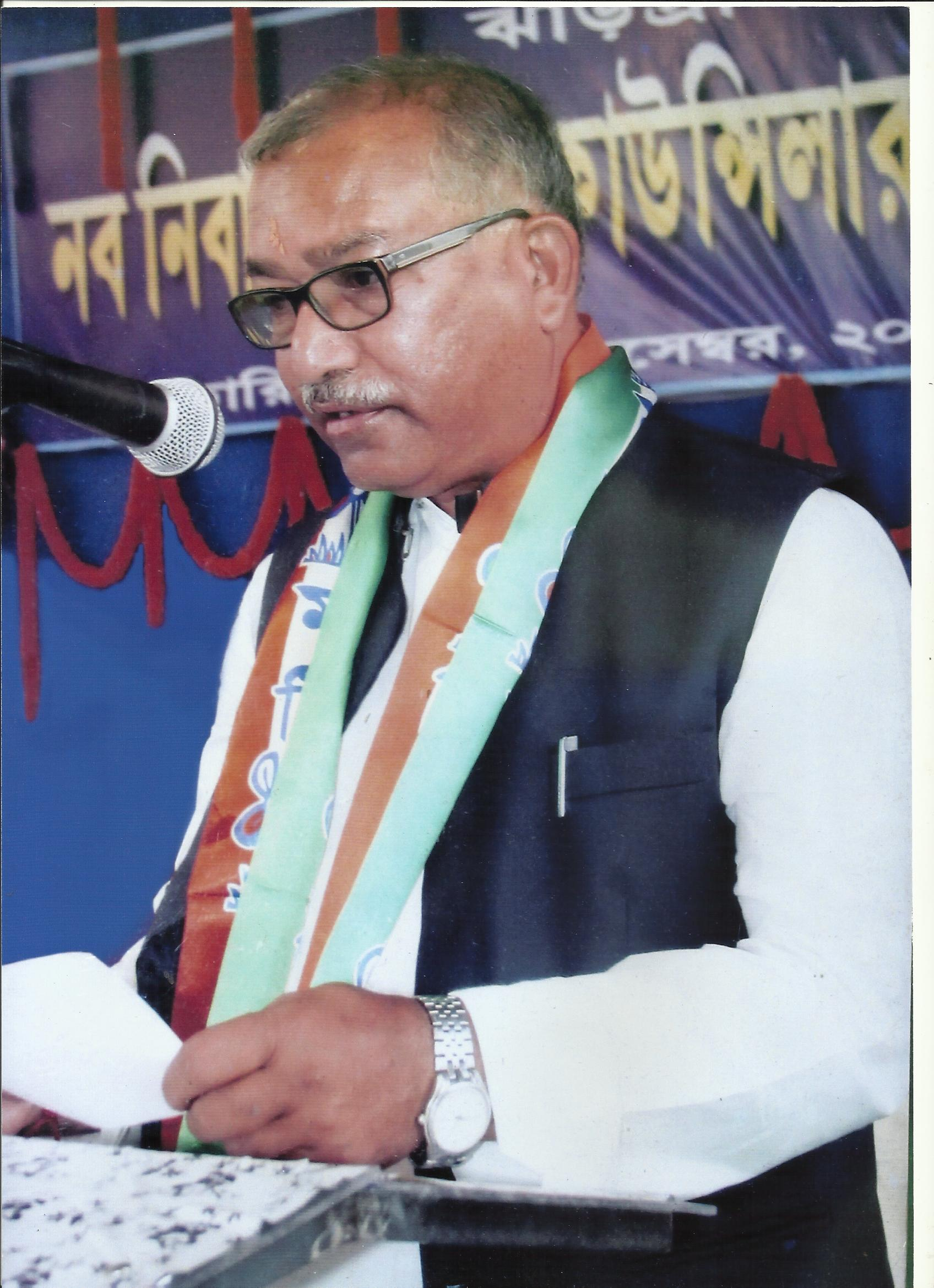
Sri.Shivendra Bijoy Malla Deb, Hon'ble Chairman of Jhargram Municipality

Shivendra Bijoy Malla Deb (Bengali: শিবেন্দ্র বিজয় মল্ল দেব), known as Durgesh Da, is a veteran Indian politician. He is from Jhargram, West Bengal.

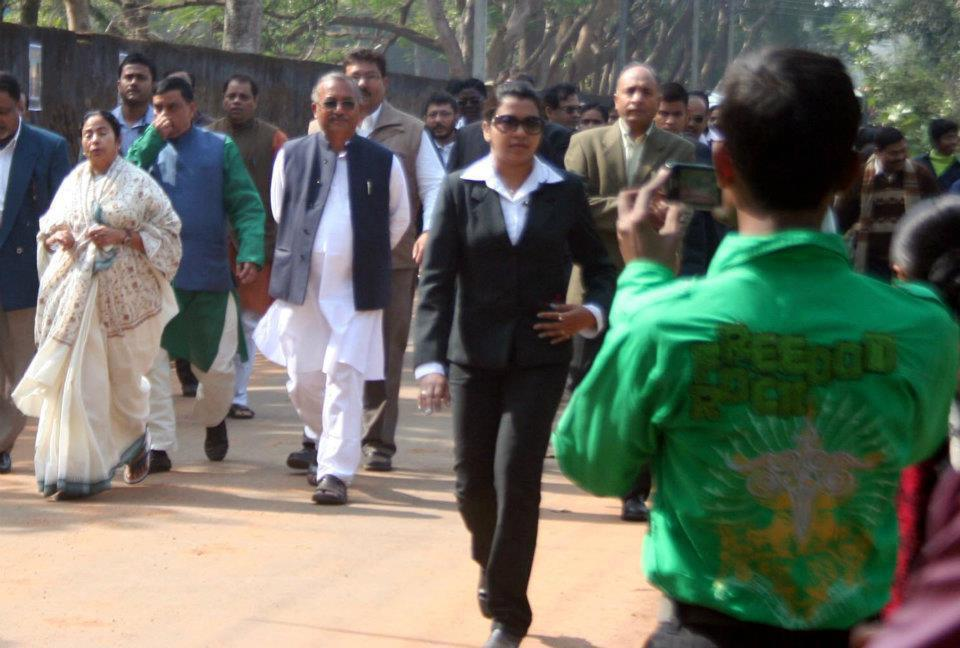
Shivendra Bijoy Malla Deb with Mamata Banerjee at an election campaign in Jhargram

== Career ==
He is currently the Mentor to Jhargram Municipality, previously he had held the position of Mayor/Chairman -In-Council of Jhargram Municipality (ঝাড়গ্রাম পৌরসভা) from 2013 to 2022. Shivendra is elected Councillor of the No.14 Ward, Jhargram Municipality since 2003. He is the Vice President of the All India Trinamool Congress in Jhargram district. Shivendra contested the 2006 West Bengal Legislative Assembly election from Jhargram, he was defeated by his nearest rival Amar Basu of Communist Party of India.
He was among the 11 Trinamool Congress political leaders in West Bengal who received threats from Maoists, hence he is provided with armed security by the West Bengal Home Department.
