= Moudi =

- village
- Country: India
- State: West Bengal
- District: Bankura

Languages
  - Official: Bengali, English
- Time zone: UTC+5:30 (IST)
- PIN: 722144
- ISO 3166 code: IN-WB
- Vehicle registration: WB-

Moudi is a village situated in district Bankura, West Bengal, India under police station Onda. There is a small river to the north and a jungle to the west. The population is around 2000. Their main occupation is agriculture.

There are two large ponds, Gayer band and Bilar band. In the east side of the village, there is an ancient banyan tree. The village-god Moudi-shini has resided under this tree since before known history.
