= Alipurduar Municipality =

Type
- Type: Municipality

History
- Founded: 1957; 69 years ago

Leadership
- Chairman: Prasenjit Kar, AITC
- Vice Chairman: Mampi Adhikary, AITC

Structure
- Seats: 20
- Political groups: Government (16): AITC (16); Opposition (4): IND (3); INC (1)

Elections
- Last election: 2022
- Next election: 2027

Website
- www.alipurduarmunicipality.in

Alipurduar Municipality is the civic body that governs Alipurduar city in Alipurduar subdivision of Alipurduar district, West Bengal, India.

== History ==
Alipurduar municipality was established on 7 February 1957.

== Geography ==
Alipurduar Municipality covers an area of 8.98 km^{2} and has a total population of 65,232 (2011).

== Current members ==
Alipurduar Municipality has a total of 20 members or councillors, who are directly elected after a term of 5 years. The council is led by the chairperson. The latest elections were held on 12 February 2022. The current chairman of Alipurduar Municipality is Prasenjit Kar of the Trinamool Congress. The current vice chairman is Mampi Adhikary of the Trinamool Congress.

Chairman: Prasenjit Kar
Vice Chairman: Mampi Adhikary
Ward No.	Name of Councillor	Party	Remarks
1	Prasenjit Kar	Trinamool Congress	
2	Srila Dutta	Independent	
3	Mausumi Bagchi	Trinamool Congress	
4	Susmita Raha	Trinamool Congress	
5	Debkanta Barua	Trinamool Congress	
6	Gargi Talukder	Independent	
7	Partha Pratim Ghosh	Trinamool Congress	
8	Mitali Majumder	Trinamool Congress	
9	Dipak Sarkar	Trinamool Congress	
10	Jhuma Mitra	Independent	
11	Partha Sarkar	Trinamool Congress	
12	Dipta Chatterjee	Trinamool Congress	
13	Anand Kumar Jaiswal	Trinamool Congress	
14	Madhabi Dey Sarkar	Trinamool Congress	
15	Partha Pratim Mandal	Trinamool Congress	
16	Dibakar Pal	Trinamool Congress	
17	Mampi Adhikary	Trinamool Congress	
18	Arupa Ray	Trinamool Congress	
19	Madan Ghosh	Trinamool Congress	
20	Shantanu Debnath	Indian National Congress	

== Elections ==
=== 2022 ===
Alipurduar Municipality
Party	Won	+/−
Trinamool Congress	16	
Indian National Congress	1	
Independents	3	
Total	20	
