= Arambagh Municipality =

Civic body that governs the town of Arambagh in Hooghly district, West Bengal, India

Type
- Type: Municipality

History
- Founded: 1886; 140 years ago

Leadership
- Chairman: Samir Bhandari, AITC
- Vice Chairman: Mamata Mukherjee, AITC

Structure
- Seats: 19
- Political groups: Government (18): AITC (18); Opposition (1): BJP (1)

Elections
- Last election: 27 February 2022
- Next election: 2027

Website
- www.arambaghmunicipality.org

Arambagh Municipality is the civic body that governs Arambagh and its surrounding areas in Arambagh subdivision of Hooghly district, West Bengal, India.

== History ==
Arambagh Municipality was established in 1886.

== Geography ==
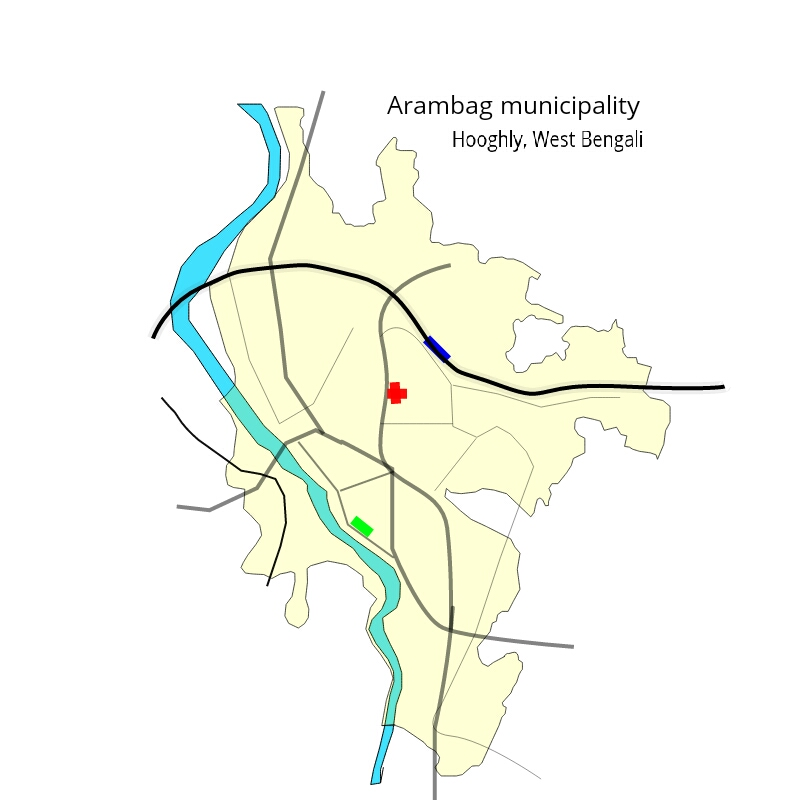
Map of Arambagh Municipality

Arambagh Municipality covers an area of 117.20 sq km and has a total population of 66,175 (2011).

== Healthcare ==
Arambagh Subdivisonal Hospital, with 250 beds, is located in the Arambagh Municipality area.

== Current members ==
Arambagh Municipality has a total of 19 members or councillors, who are directly elected after a term of 5 years. The council is led by the Chairperson. The latest elections were held on 12 February 2022. The current chairperson of Arambagh Municipality is Samir Bhandari of the Trinamool Congress. The current deputy chairperson is Mamata Mukherjee of the Trinamool Congress.

Chairperson: Samir Bhandari
Deputy Chairperson: Mamata Mukherjee
Ward No.	Name of Councillor	Party	Remarks
1	Retun Kundu	Trinamool Congress	
2	Soma Pandit	Trinamool Congress	
3	Biswanath Chatterjee	Trinamool Congress	
4	Mamata Mukherjee	Trinamool Congress	
5	Ram Prasad Dolui	Trinamool Congress	
6	Swapan Kumar Nandi	Trinamool Congress	
7	Aparajita Roy	Trinamool Congress	
8	Sheikh Shukur Ali	Trinamool Congress	
9	Mita Dey	Trinamool Congress	
10	Tushar Karfa	Trinamool Congress	
11	Sanjoy Ghorui	Trinamool Congress	
12	Tripti Kundu	Trinamool Congress	
13	Rathindra Nath Das	Trinamool Congress	
14	Hasan Ali	Trinamool Congress	
15	Sanjoy Das	Trinamool Congress	
16	Samir Bhandari	Trinamool Congress	
17	Ruma Karmakar	Trinamool Congress	
18	Pradip Singha Roy	Trinamool Congress	
19	Biswajit Ghosh	Bharatiya Janata Party	

== Election results ==
In the 2022 municipal elections for Arambagh Municipality Trinamool Congress won 18 seats and BJP won 1 seat

In the 2015 municipal elections for Arambagh Municipality Trinamool Congress won all 19 seats.

In the 2010 municipal elections for Arambagh Municipality Trinamool Congress won 9 seats, CPI (M) 7 seats, Forward Bloc 1 seat and Independent 1 seat.

About the 2010 municipal elections, The Guardian wrote, "Today's municipal elections are unlike any for decades: the Communists, who have held West Bengal's main towns almost without a break since the 1970s, are facing disaster… This time defeat is likely to be definitive and could signal the beginning of the end for the Communist Party of India-Marxist (CPIM)."

In the 2005 municipal elections for Arambagh Municipality, CPI (M) won 11 seats, CPI 1 seat, Forward Bloc 3 seats and others 3 seats.
