= Bankura =

- City
- Location in West Bengal, India Bankura (India)
- Coordinates: 23.25°N 87.07°E
- Country: India
- State: West Bengal
- District: Bankura

Government
  - Type: Municipality
  - Body: Bankura Municipality
  - Chairman: Aloka Majumdar (AITC)
  - Vice Chairman: Hiralal Chattaraj (AITC)
  - Lok Sabha MP: Arup Chakraborty (AITC)
  - MLA: Niladri Sekhar Dana (BJP)

Area
  - Total: 19.06 km^{2} (7.36 sq mi)
  - Rank: Block total =22 Police station =23
- Elevation: 78 m (256 ft)

Population (2011)
  - Total: 137,386
  - Density: 7,208/km^{2} (18,670/sq mi)

Languages
  - Official: Bengali, English
- Time zone: UTC+5:30 (IST)
- PIN: 722101, 722102, 722146, 722151 & 722155 (Suburban)
- Telephone code: 03242
- Lok Sabha: Bankura
- Vidhan Sabha: Bankura
- Website: www.bankura.gov.in

Bankura (/bænˈkʊərə/) is a city and a municipality in the state of West Bengal, India. It is the headquarters of the Bankura district.

== Etymology ==
It comes from the old Austric word ráŕhá or ráŕho which means “land of red soil”. 2-n ancient times "China called Ráŕh by the name of 'Láti'". 3-n Santali, lar means thread, rarh means tune and larh means snake. 4-.Perhaps the Jain and Greek scholars used this original Austric word larh to indicate this dry, difficult forest region. The popularity of Manasa Puja, the worship of the Snake-Goddess Manasa, shows this title might come from "reverence." According to Nilkantha, a commentator of the Mahabharata, the words suhmo [bhumi] (Sanskrit: suhma-bhūmi) and Rarh are synonymous.

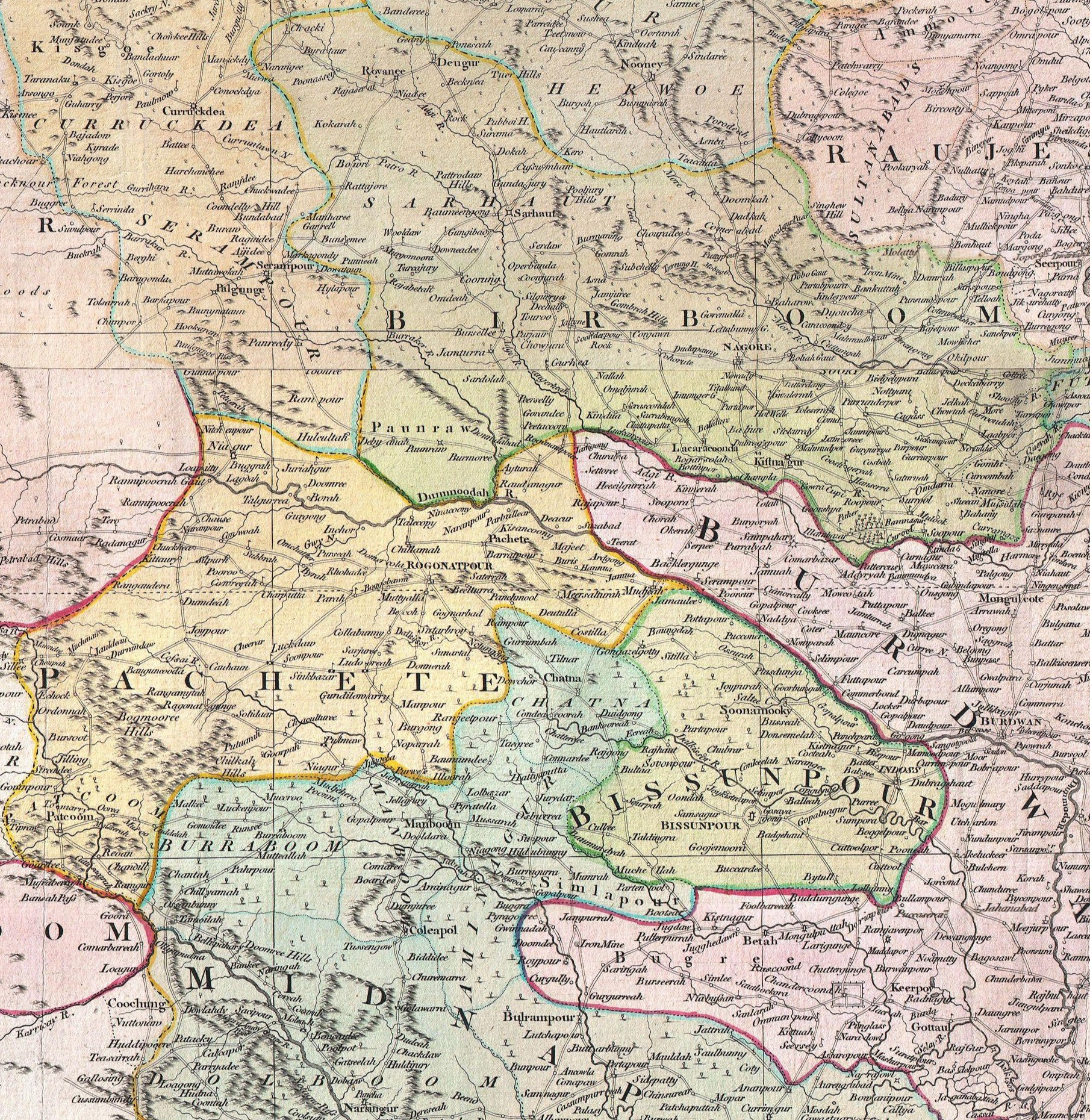
Bankura (labelled as Bankooreah) in Chatna area of Midnapore district. (1776 map by James Rennell)

Scholars differ in their opinion about the etymology of the name Bankura. In The Origin and Development of the Bengali Language (1926, Vol. I, p. 66, §42), Suniti Kumar Chatterji identifies Bankura among several Bengali place-names exhibiting the suffix -rā/-ṛā, which he suggests may derive partly from Dravidian vāḍa. However, he also proposes Old Indo-Aryan vṛta-ka as a possible alternative and draws attention to the Kol-Munda word orak, meaning “house.” His discussion therefore leaves the linguistic origin of the suffix unresolved.

Other explanations derive the name from local historical and religious traditions. One associates it with Bā̃kuṛā Rāẏ, an epithet of the regional deity Dharmathakur, while another attributes it to a chieftain named Banku Rai. A further hypothesis connects the name with Bankunda, interpreted as “five tanks,” a form mentioned in older genealogical traditions. Popular etymologies have also associated the name with Bengali bā̃kā, meaning “crooked” or “winding,” and bā̃ku, interpreted as “beautiful” or “worthy of veneration,” although these interpretations remain unsubstantiated.

Historical cartography and administrative records preserve several variant spellings. James Rennell's map of 1779 identifies the locality as "Bancoorah", while J. E. Gastrell's geographical report of 1863 records the forms "Bancoorah" and "Bacoondah". These attestations demonstrate variation in the recorded name but do not conclusively establish its etymology.

Bir Hambir was the 49th King of Malla dynasty. Bir Bankura was one of his two sons. Raja Bir Hambir divided his kingdom into 22 tarafs or circles and gave one to his each son. Taraf Jaybelia fell to the lot of Bir Bankura. He developed a town in his taraf and the town was later named as 'Bankura' after its founder's name.

== Geography ==
Places in Bankura Sadar subdivision in Bankura district
M: municipal town/ city, CT: census town, R: rural/ urban centre, H: hill centre, T: temple/ religious centre, B: barrage
Owing to space constraints in the small map, the actual locations in a larger map may vary slightly

=== Location ===
Bankura district is located in the north western part of the state of West Bengal. It is a part of Bardhaman Division of the State and is included in the area known as "Rarh" in Bengal. Bankura district is situated at 23.25°N 87.07°E. The Damodar River flows along the Northern boundary of the district. Bankura district is bounded by Purba Bardhaman and Paschim Bardhman district in the north and east, Paschim Medinipur district in the south and Purulia to the west.

The Bankura Forest composes about 21% of the entire district. It has degraded in some areas due to overuse by humans. 21.5% of the total geographical area of the district is made up of forest land, covering a total of 148,177 hectares. Net cultivable area of the district is 4.30 lakh (430,000) hectares.

=== Area overview ===
The map alongside shows the Bankura Sadar subdivision of Bankura district. Physiographically, this area is part of the Bankura Uplands in the west, which gradually merges with the Bankura-Bishnupur Rarh Plains in the north-east. The western portions are characterised by undulating terrain with many hills and ridges. The area gradually descends from the Chota Nagpur Plateau. The soil is laterite red and hard beds are covered with scrub jungle and sal wood. Eventually, it gives way to just uneven rolling lands but the soil continues to be lateritic. There are coal mines in the northern part, along the Damodar River. It is a predominantly a rural area with 89% of the population living in rural areas and only 11% living in the urban areas.

Note: The map alongside presents some of the notable locations in the subdivision. All places marked in the map are linked in the larger full screen map.

=== Climate ===
Bankura has a tropical savanna climate (Köppen Aw) with very warm conditions in the "cool" season from November to February, and hot to sweltering temperatures from March to October. Rainfall occurs mostly between June and September and the annual amount is about 1,500 millimetres or 59 inches. Till 2020, the highest ever recorded temperature is 47.4 °C (117.3 °F) on 8 May 1977, and the lowest 4.8 °C (40.6 °F) on 9 January 2013.

Climate data for Bankura (1991–2020, extremes 1901–2020)
Month	Jan	Feb	Mar	Apr	May	Jun	Jul	Aug	Sep	Oct	Nov	Dec	Year
Record high °C (°F)	34.0 (93.2)	39.3 (102.7)	43.1 (109.6)	46.7 (116.1)	47.4 (117.3)	47.0 (116.6)	41.2 (106.2)	39.8 (103.6)	39.0 (102.2)	39.0 (102.2)	37.0 (98.6)	33.6 (92.5)	47.4 (117.3)
Mean daily maximum °C (°F)	25.6 (78.1)	29.2 (84.6)	34.6 (94.3)	37.7 (99.9)	37.6 (99.7)	35.6 (96.1)	32.8 (91.0)	32.7 (90.9)	32.8 (91.0)	32.1 (89.8)	29.9 (85.8)	26.5 (79.7)	32.3 (90.1)
Mean daily minimum °C (°F)	11.7 (53.1)	15.5 (59.9)	20.2 (68.4)	24.3 (75.7)	25.7 (78.3)	26.1 (79.0)	25.7 (78.3)	25.7 (78.3)	25.5 (77.9)	23.0 (73.4)	17.7 (63.9)	13.0 (55.4)	21.2 (70.2)
Record low °C (°F)	4.8 (40.6)	5.1 (41.2)	10.8 (51.4)	16.0 (60.8)	17.0 (62.6)	19.4 (66.9)	18.6 (65.5)	20.0 (68.0)	19.2 (66.6)	13.0 (55.4)	10.5 (50.9)	5.9 (42.6)	4.8 (40.6)
Average rainfall mm (inches)	19.4 (0.76)	18.6 (0.73)	27.0 (1.06)	58.0 (2.28)	115.8 (4.56)	271.3 (10.68)	391.8 (15.43)	349.2 (13.75)	245.9 (9.68)	108.3 (4.26)	11.2 (0.44)	9.3 (0.37)	1,625.8 (64.01)
Average rainy days	1.4	1.5	2.1	3.9	6.8	11.9	16.4	15.4	11.8	5.1	0.9	0.8	78.3
Average relative humidity (%) (at 17:30 IST)	60	50	40	46	57	71	82	83	82	77	69	65	66
Source: India Meteorological Department

Climate data for Bankura (1981–2010)
Month	Jan	Feb	Mar	Apr	May	Jun	Jul	Aug	Sep	Oct	Nov	Dec	Year
Record high °C (°F)	34.0 (93.2)	39.3 (102.7)	43.1 (109.6)	45.8 (114.4)	47.4 (117.3)	47.0 (116.6)	41.2 (106.2)	39.8 (103.6)	39.0 (102.2)	39.0 (102.2)	37.0 (98.6)	33.6 (92.5)	47.4 (117.3)
Mean maximum °C (°F)	28.9 (84.0)	30.6 (87.1)	36.7 (98.1)	41.1 (106.0)	42.2 (108.0)	40.7 (105.3)	37.2 (99.0)	36.4 (97.5)	36.6 (97.9)	34.7 (94.5)	32.6 (90.7)	28.9 (84.0)	42.5 (108.5)
Mean daily maximum °C (°F)	25.4 (77.7)	27.7 (81.9)	32.5 (90.5)	37.1 (98.8)	38.8 (101.8)	37.1 (98.8)	34.1 (93.4)	33.7 (92.7)	33.9 (93.0)	32.3 (90.1)	29.2 (84.6)	25.7 (78.3)	32.3 (90.1)
Mean daily minimum °C (°F)	12.4 (54.3)	16.0 (60.8)	20.1 (68.2)	24.3 (75.7)	26.4 (79.5)	26.5 (79.7)	25.9 (78.6)	25.9 (78.6)	25.5 (77.9)	23.3 (73.9)	18.8 (65.8)	13.2 (55.8)	21.5 (70.7)
Mean minimum °C (°F)	8.1 (46.6)	12.1 (53.8)	16.5 (61.7)	20.1 (68.2)	22.8 (73.0)	23.4 (74.1)	23.7 (74.7)	24.0 (75.2)	24.2 (75.6)	20.1 (68.2)	14.4 (57.9)	9.7 (49.5)	8.3 (46.9)
Record low °C (°F)	0.8 (33.4)	5.1 (41.2)	10.8 (51.4)	16.0 (60.8)	17.0 (62.6)	19.4 (66.9)	18.6 (65.5)	20.0 (68.0)	19.2 (66.6)	13.0 (55.4)	10.5 (50.9)	5.9 (42.6)	0.8 (33.4)
Average rainfall mm (inches)	15.8 (0.62)	14.1 (0.56)	35.5 (1.40)	34.7 (1.37)	75.9 (2.99)	264.7 (10.42)	384.9 (15.15)	337.0 (13.27)	240.4 (9.46)	72.7 (2.86)	21.1 (0.83)	11.6 (0.46)	1,508.4 (59.39)
Average rainy days	1.5	1.5	2.6	2.8	5.3	10.9	16.7	16.0	12.1	4.3	1.0	0.5	75.2
Source: India Meteorological Department

== Demographics ==
In the 2011 census, Bankura city had a population of 137,386 of which 69,843 were males and 67,543 were females, giving a sex ratio of 967. The literacy rate was 86.12% and there were 12,148 children 0–6 years old

Religions in Bankura
Religion	Percent
Hindus	90.42%
Muslims	8.08%
Others†	1.5%

== Civic administration ==
=== Police stations ===
Bankura police station has jurisdiction over Bankura municipality, Bankura I and Bankura II CD Blocks. The area covered is 439 km^{2}. There are 3 town outposts and an outpost at Rajagram.

Bankura Sadar Division woman police station, started in 2014, has jurisdiction over whole of Bankura Sadar subdivision.

== Transport ==
Bankura Junction railway station is managed by the South Eastern Railways and is on the Adra-Kharagpur rail route. It is in Bankura city. Bhubaneswar Rajdhani Express, Rupashi Bangla Express, Aranyak Express, Puri-New Delhi (Nandan Kanan) Superfast Express, Ernakulam-Patna Express, Howrah-LTT Samarsata Express and Purulia-Howrah Express pass through this station. It is the originating and terminating station of Bankura Damodar Railway which is connected to Barddhaman-Howrah Chord section. Computerized reservation facility is available. Going towards north-west, Adra Junction Railway Station is the nearest main station and moving to south, Kharagpur Railway Station is the major station next to Bankura.

National Highway 14 (India) running from Morgam (in Murshidabad district) to Kharagpur (in Paschim Medinipur district), State Highway 9 (West Bengal) running from Durgapur (in Paschim Bardhaman district) to Nayagram (in Jhargram district) and State Highway 5 (West Bengal) running from Rupnarayanpur (in Bardhaman district) to Junput (in Purba Medinipur) pass through Bankura. NH 14 links Bankura to NH 12 and NH 16. Both NH 14 and SH 9 link Bankura to NH 19 (Grand Trunk Road).

== Tourism ==
The area has contributed toward modern Bengal art and architecture The tourist spots can be divided into four zones.

=== Eastern Zone ===
- Joyrambati is 98 km from Kolkata. It is a holy place as it was the birthplace of Sree Sree Maa Sarada Devi. Temple of Singha Bahani Devi and Mayerepukur are also visiting sites.

=== Western Zone ===
- Susunia Hill is also a tourist spot of Bankura District. It is 50 km from Bishnupur and 21 km from Bankura town . It is known for a natural spring and a historical stone engraving.
- Biharinath Hill is the tallest (448 m) of Bankura District. It is in the northwestern edge of the district. It is 57 km from Bankura Town. It was an ancient centre of Jainism, and known for its natural environment. Biharinath has hills, dense forest, water bodies, river Damodar, and a temple of Lord Shiva.

=== South Zone ===
- Mukutmanipur is a tourist spot of Bankura District. It is 55 km from Bankura District headquarters. It is the second biggest earthen dam of India.
- Jhilimili has a dense natural forest. It lies 70 km from Bankura Town.

=== Northern Zone ===
- Durgapur Barrage
- Gangdua Dam
- Koro Pahar (Amar Kanan)

== Healthcare ==
- Bankura Sammilani Medical College and Hospital is the most important hospital of the district equipped with all major departments and diagnostic facilities.
- Bankura Sub-Divisional Hospital is an important hospital. It has a paediatric ward, blood test and OT.

== Notable people ==
- Balaram Mukhopadhyay (born 1973), carbohydrate chemist and professor
- Jamini Roy, a renowned painter.
- Rocky Rupkumar Patra, a renowned film actor and director.

== See also ==
- Culture of Bankura district
