= Muthadanga =

- Village
- Location in West Bengal, India Muthadanga (India)
- Coordinates: 22.7°N 87.62°E
- Country: India
- State: West Bengal
- District: Hooghly

Population (2011)
  - Total: 14,545

Languages
  - Official: Bengali, English
- Time zone: UTC+5:30 (IST)
- ISO 3166 code: IN-WB
- Sex ratio: 908 ♂/♀
- Lok Sabha constituency: Arambagh

Muthadanga is a village under Arambagh block and police station in Arambagh subdivision of Hooghly district in the Indian state of West Bengal.

== Demographics ==
Muthadanga has a population of 38,214. 58%male and 42% are female.

== Economics ==
This is a rich agricultural area with several cold storages. Chief products are potato and rice.

== Education ==
Muthadanga high school is major school in Muthadanga. There are 3 primary school in Muthadanga.

== Culture ==
The religious culture of Muthadanga is an example of integrity in diversity. Here, the Hindu community of Muthadanga Pal-para, celebrated their own religious rituals and festivals like Mangalchandi Puja, Hari-Nam Sankirtan (on Ganesh Chaturdashi, since 1927), Durga Puja and Kali Puja in traditional style. Very recently, in 2020, at the hands of the younger generation, they celebrated the 100th year of Kali Puja. Besides Hindu festivals, the Muslim community also celebrated their own religious rituals, like Eid, Maharam, etc. Every year after Vai fota Muthadanga-Pal-para-Tarun-Sangha, they conduct a few wonderful stage dramas.

Furthermore, Muthadanga Palpara Maa Mongal Chandi Seva Prathisthan Charitable Trust is run by a few dedicated individuals such as Sanat Pal, Samar Pal, Gunadhar Pal and others with the goal of promoting the rural educationally marginalized child, religious rituals, alleviating poverty in the community, and benefiting the entire community.

== Transport ==
The Arambagh Tarakeswar line crossing through the Muthadanga. It is a state high way.

== Climate ==
The temperature in the summer is 28 to 32 and in winter 10 to 19.Average rainfall 175 cm.
