= Arambagh Vivekananda Pally =

- Neighbourhood
- Location in West Bengal, India
- Coordinates: 22°52′35″N 87°47′27″E
- Country: India
- State: West Bengal
- District: Hooghly district

Government
  - Committee Secretary: Paran Pan
- Elevation: 15 m (49 ft)

Population (2011)
  - Total: 1,300
  - Density: 2,224/km^{2} (5,760/sq mi)

Languages
  - Official: Bengali, English
- Time zone: UTC+5:30 (IST)
- PIN: 712601
- Sex ratio: 722 ♂/♀

Vivekananda Pally is a part of the city of Arambagh, in West Bengal, India. This is a densely populated area. There are approximately 325 houses and 3 shops. Prominent residential colonies like Rabindra Pally Colony and the Sarada Pally Colony are near Vivekananda Pally.

This colony sees many students from the village area and the other colonies of Arambagh congregate daily to study. The Arambagh-Tarakeswar rail line makes a crossing near this town.

== Demographics ==
As of 2011 India census, Vivekananda Pally had a population of 1300. Males constitute 60% of the population and females 40%. It has an average literacy rate of 96%, higher than the national average of 59.5%; with 95% male literacy and 92% of female literacy. 3% of the population is under 6 years of age. 75% people are government employees, 10% are doctors and engineers and 10% are businessmen.

=== Festival ===
Eid al-Fitr, Eid al-Adha, Durga Puja, Kali Puja and Saraswati puja are the main festivals celebrated here.
