= Arambagh =

- City
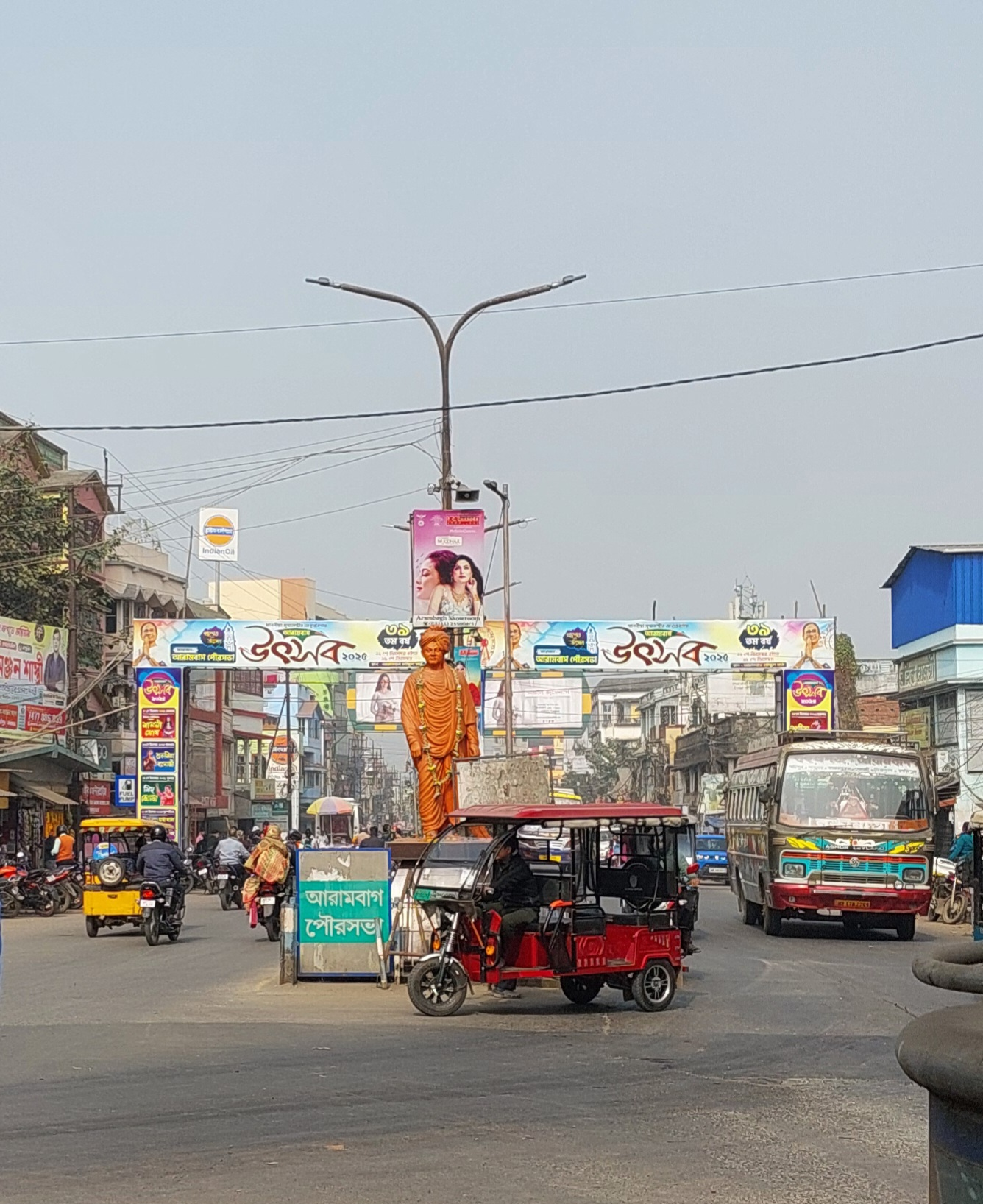
- Centre of Arambagh town

- Location in West Bengal, India Arambagh (India)
- Coordinates: 22.88°N 87.78°E
- Country: India
- State: West Bengal
- District: Hooghly district

Government
  - Type: Municipality
  - Body: Arambagh Municipality
  - Chairman: Samir Bhandari (AITC)
  - Vice Chairman: Mamata Mukherjee (AITC)
  - Lok Sabha MP: Mitali Bag (NCPI)
  - MLA: Hemanta Bag (BJP)

Area
  - Total: 117.20 km^{2} (45.25 sq mi)
- Elevation: 15 m (49 ft)

Population (2011)
  - Total: 66,175
  - Density: 564.63/km^{2} (1,462.4/sq mi)

Languages
  - Official: Bengali, English
- Time zone: UTC+5:30 (IST)
- PIN: 712601
- Telephone code: +91 (0) 3211
- Vehicle registration: WB-16
- Lok Sabha: Arambagh
- Vidhan Sabha: Arambagh

Arambagh also known as Arambag is a town and a municipality in Hooghly district in the state of West Bengal, India. It is the headquarters of Arambagh subdivision.

== Geography ==
Cities and towns in Arambagh subdivision in Hooghly district
M: municipal city/ town, R: rural/ urban centre, H: historical/ religious centre
Owing to space constraints in the small map, the actual locations in a larger map may vary slightly

=== Location ===
Arambagh is located at 22.88°N 87.78°E. It has an average elevation of 15 metres (118 feet). The town is situated on the link Road (state highway-2) 81Km north-west of Kolkata, 27 Km north-west of Tarakeswar, 39 Km south-east of Bardhaman. It is located on the bank of the Dwarakeswar River.

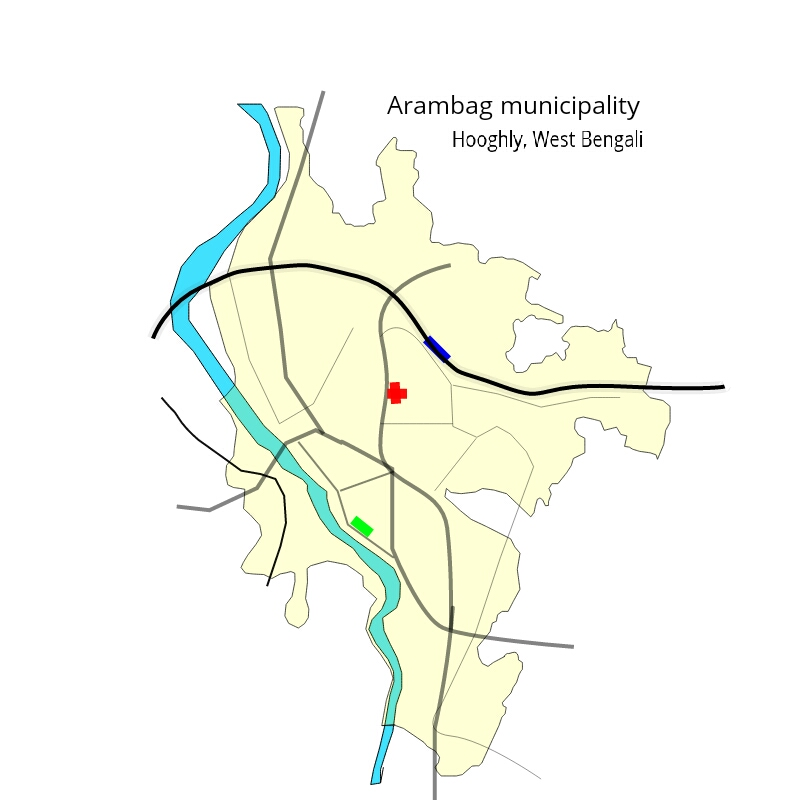
Map of Arambagh Municipality

=== Area overview ===
The Arambagh subdivision, presented in the map alongside, is divided into two physiographic parts – the Dwarakeswar River being the dividing line. The western part is upland and rocky – it is extension of the terrain of neighbouring Bankura district. The eastern part is flat alluvial plain area. The railways, the roads and flood-control measures have had an impact on the area. The area is overwhelmingly rural with 94.77% of the population living in rural areas and 5.23% in urban areas.

Note: The map alongside presents some of the notable locations in the subdivision. All places marked in the map are linked in the larger full screen map.

=== Climate ===
The maximum temperature during summer rises up to 42 °C (2016) while minimum temperature during winter comes down to 8 °C. Average annual rainfall is 1600 millimetres.

== Demographics ==
According to the 2011 Census of India, Arambagh had a total population of 66,175 of which 33,443 (51%) were males and 32,732 (49%) were females. Population in the age range 0–6 years was 6,522. The total number of literate persons in Arambagh was 48,338 (81.03% of the population over 6 years).

As of 2001 India census, Arambagh had a population of 66,175. Males constitute 62% of the population and females 38%. Arambagh has an average literacy rate of 82%, higher than the national average of 59.5%; with 79% male literacy and 58% of female literacy. 17% of the population is under 6 years of age.

== Civic administration ==
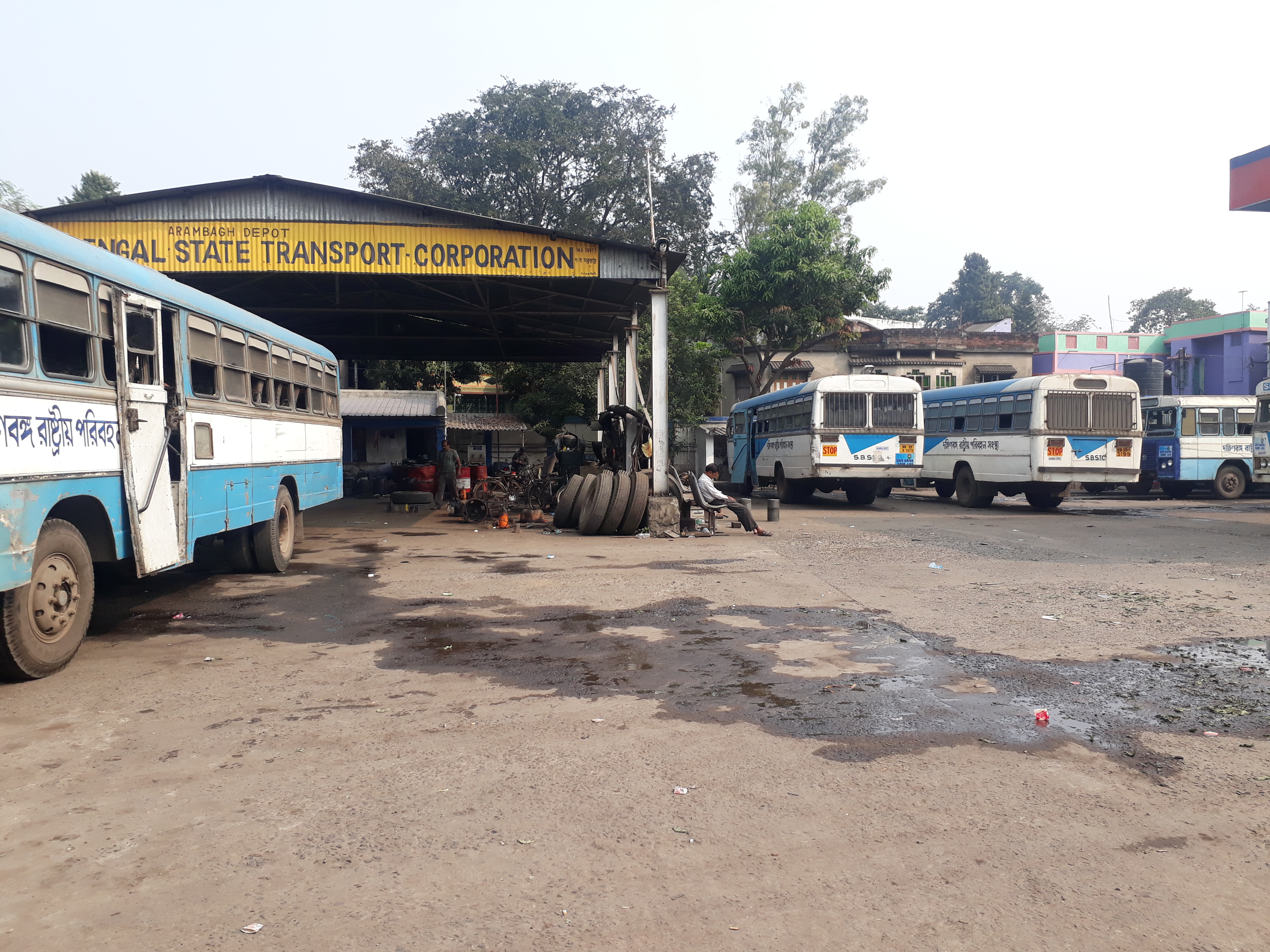
Arambagh State Transport Corporation bus depot

=== Police station ===
Arambagh police station has jurisdiction over Arambagh municipal area and Arambagh CD block. The headquarters of Arambagh CD block are located at Arambagh.

== Economics ==
This is a rice and potato agricultural area with several rice mills and cold storages. Many Top branded companies set up their business in Arambagh.

== History ==
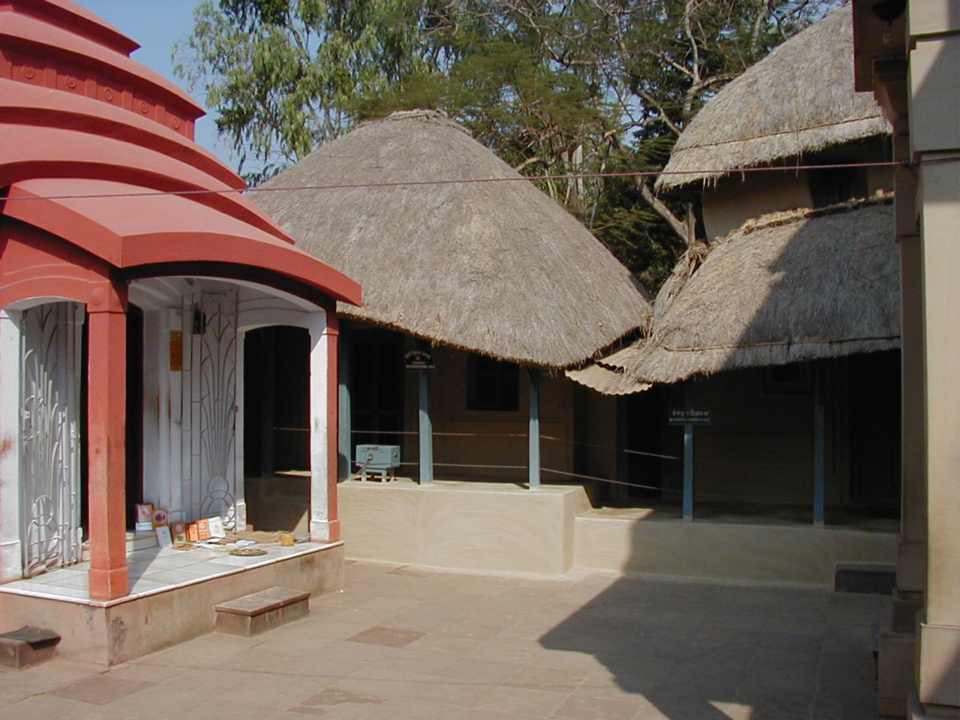
Kamarpukur Ramakrishna Hut

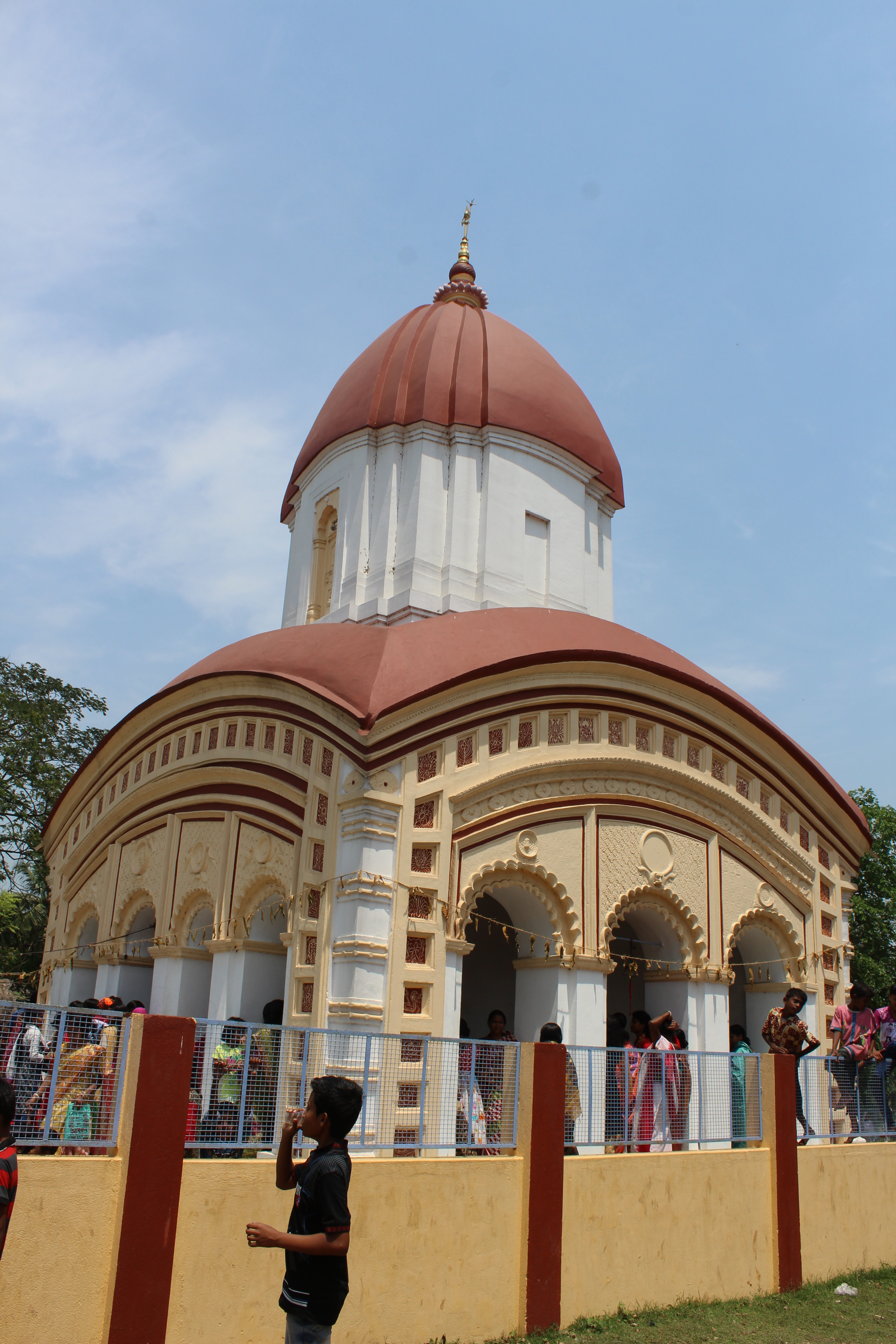
Kanakeshwar Shiva temple

Arambagh sub-division was formed in 1879. It was known as Jahanabad Sub-Division as the headquarters of the sub-division was the town of Jahanabad.Bankim Chandra Chattopadhyay was the first Sub-Divisional Officer of Arambagh. On 19 April 1900 the name was changed from Jahanabad to Arambagh, which means "the garden of ease and comfort". Other prominent figures from the district were:

- Rammohan Roy – Reformer. He was Ambassador of Mughal Emperor.
- Prafulla Chandra Sen – Freedom fighter, Chief Minister of W.B.
- Ramkrishna Parmahnsa - Indian Hindu mystic and saint during the 19th century Bengal. Kamarpukur was his birthplace.
- Prasanna Kumar Sarbadhikary – First Patiganit (arithmetic book in Bengali) writer.
- Nandlal Maity - Writer of history of mathematics in Bengali in three volume.
- Narayan Ch Ghosh - Defined the term Folkmathematics - mathematics that is manifestation of folk life.

== Education ==
=== Libraries ===
Two government sponsored public libraries are situated in Arambagh. Raja Rammohan Roy Pathagar-o- Sanskriti Parishad is the oldest and most popular library of this area. Another library is Arambagh Sub Divisional library. Besides these two, there are many other public libraries in the surrounding area.

=== CBSE affiliated Schools ===
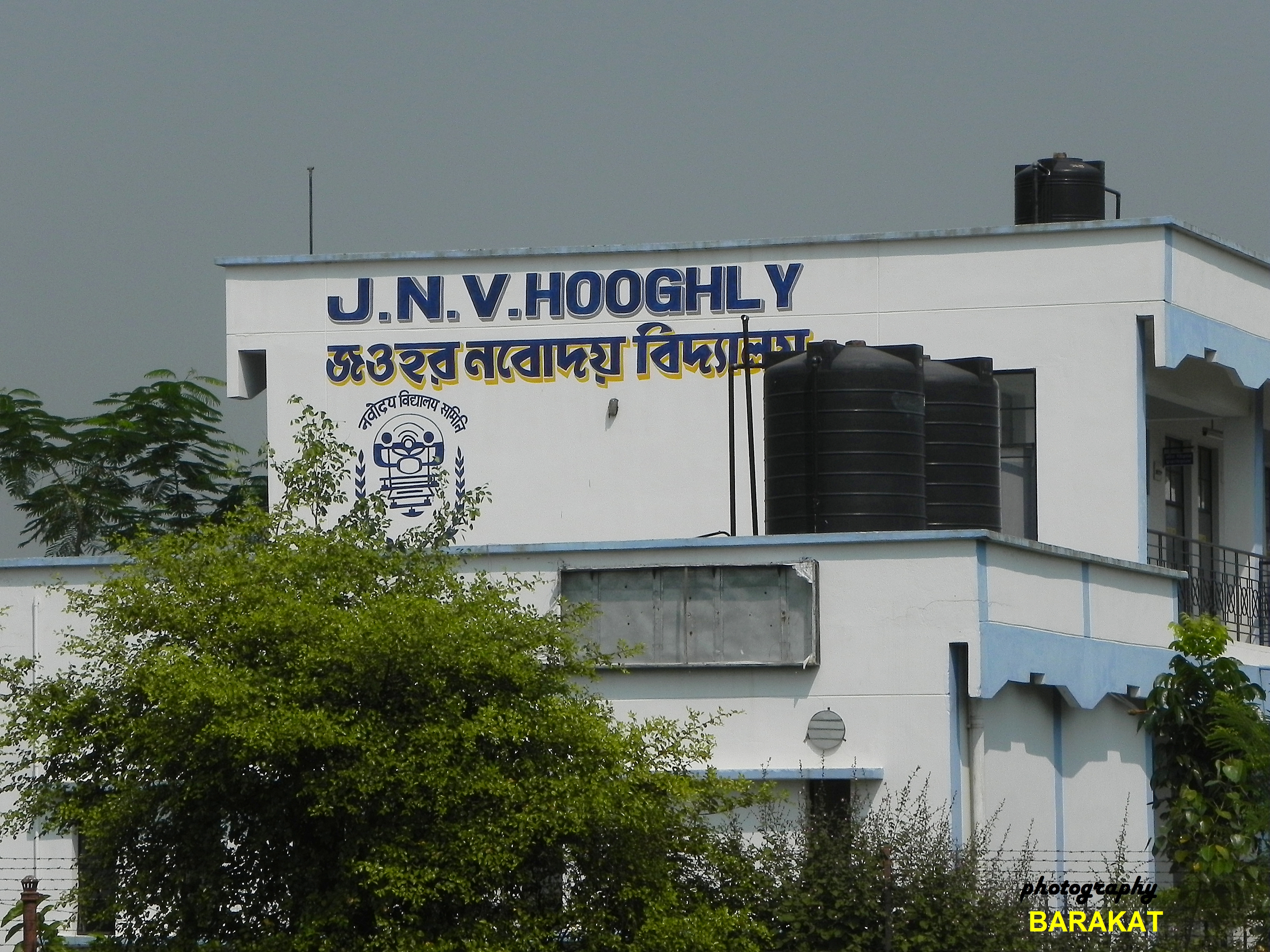
Jawahar Navodaya Vidyalaya, Hooghly

- Arambagh Vivekananda Academy (CBSE affiliate from 2007)
- Jawahar Navodaya Vidyalaya, Arambagh, Hooghly
- Pearl Rosary School, Arambagh, Hooghly (An authorised study centre of National Institute of Open Schooling (NIOS), Govt of India.)

=== CISCE (ICSE/ISC) Schools ===
- Sarada Vidyapith, affiliated to CISCE, New Delhi (School Code: WB508).

=== West Bengal Board affiliated schools ===
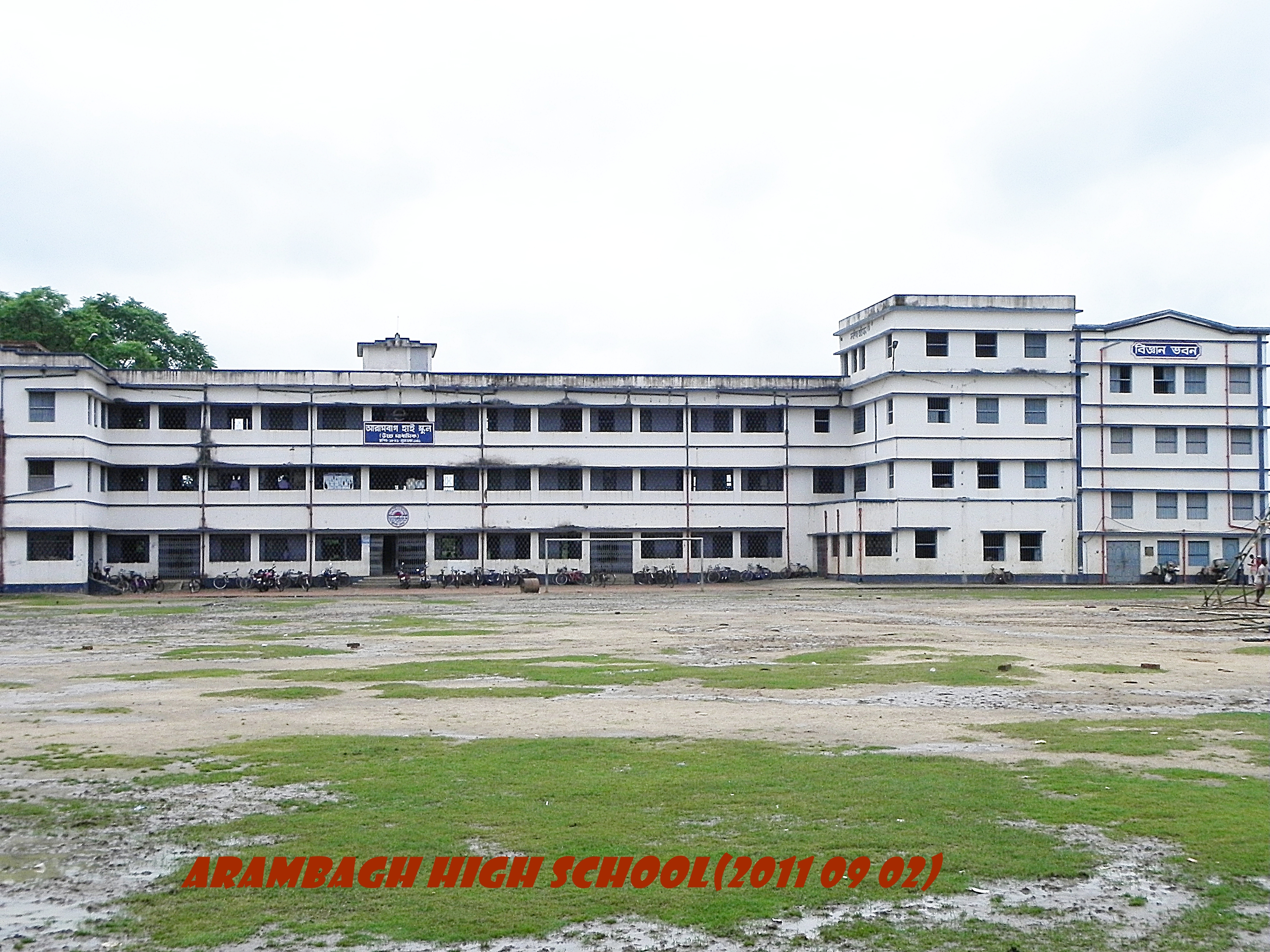
Arambag High School

A list of the West Bengal Board affiliated schools in Arambagh, is given below:

- Bagharbard High School, Bagharbard, Mandalganthi, Hooghly
- Kapsit High School, Kapsit, Arambagh, Hooghly
- Batanal Union High School
- Arambag High School
- Kalipur Swamiji High School
- Pearl Rosary School
- Bajua High School
- Arambagh Girls High School
- Kanpur Krishnabati Vivekananda Institution
- Parul Ramkrishna Sarada High School
- Arambagh Boys Primari School
- Basanta Prathamik Vidhyalaya
- Dihibagnan K.B.Roy High School
- Saraswati Sishu Mandir, Balibela
- Tirol High School, Tirol
- Gourhati Haradas Institution
- Golta High School
- Golta Nimna Buniadi Vidyalaya
- Joyrampur Netaji High School
- Muthadanga R.K. High School
- Pirijpur Hamidannesa Vidyapith
- Bhurkunda High School (H.S)
- Naisarai High School
- Nirbhoy pur Badalkona Ghiya Nilkantha Sikshanikaten High School
- Uttor Badalkona Prathomik Bidyaloy
- Hatbasantapur Hara Parbbati Institution (H.S.)
- Goghat High School (HS)
- Bali High School (H.S.)
- Udayrajpur High School (H.S.)
- Damodarpur High School (H.S.)
- Bengai High School (H.S.)
- Shaikhpur High School, Uttar Rasulpur, Hooghly
- Karui P.C High School (H.S) Karui, arambagh, hooghly, 712615
- Baradongal R N Institution (H.S), Baradongal, Hooghly, 712617
- Kumursha Sital Chandra Dey Vidyamandir (H.S), Kumursha, Hooghly, 712616
- Saora Union High School, Saora, Hooghly
- Ghoshpur Union Netaji Vidyapith, Ghoshpur, Hooghly
- Gourhati Haradas Institution
- Raghunathput Saradamoni Valika Vidyalaya
- Ghasua Janata High School
- Mayal K.C. Roy Institution
- Thakuranichak Union High School
- Thakuranichak BBD Institution
- Dhanyaghori High School, Bandar
- Ghoradaha Sudhanya Charan High School
- Pole P.C.Sen High School
- Bengejola High School
- Ramnagar Atul Vidyalaya
- Madhurpur High School
- Patul Ganeshbazar High School(HS)
- Radhaballavpur High School
- Balarampur Primary School
- Mohanpur Primary School
- Khudiram Child Learning Centre (primary school)
- Anandamarga School (primary school), Rabindrapally, Arambagh
- Sisu Guchho (primary school)
- Kashinath Primary School
- Nirvoipur Primary School
- Chandibati Primary School
- Basudevpur Parul Jr. Basic School
- Dihibayra Primary School
- Haripur Sayedia Primary School
- Kamarpukur Ramakrishna Mission Multipurpose School
- Garh Mandaran High School
- Dhamsa P C SEN Institution
- Dakshin Rasulpur High School (H.S)
- Paschim Ghoshpur Ramkrishna Bidyapith (H.S)
- Chandur High School (H.S),712602, Chandur, Arambagh.
- Baradongal Ramanath Institution

=== General degree colleges ===
- Aghorekamini Prakashchandra Mahavidyalaya, Bengai, Goghat II CD Block
- Arambagh Girls' College, Arambagh
- Kabikankan Mukundaram Mahavidyalaya, Keshabpur, Arambagh CD Block
- Netaji Mahavidyalaya, Kalipur, Arambagh
- Rabindra Mahavidyalaya, Champadanga, Pursurah
- Raja Rammohan Roy Mahavidyalaya, Radhanagore, Khanakul I CD Block
- Sri Ramkrishna Sarada Vidyamahapith, Kamarpukur, Goghat II CD Block

=== Polytechnic ===
- ITI-Bengai, Goghat
- Arambagh Government Polytechnic, Arambagh
- The New Horizon Institute of Technology, Durgapur

== See also ==
- Arambagh Vivekananda Pally
- Muthadanga
