= Bankura Forest =

Forest in India

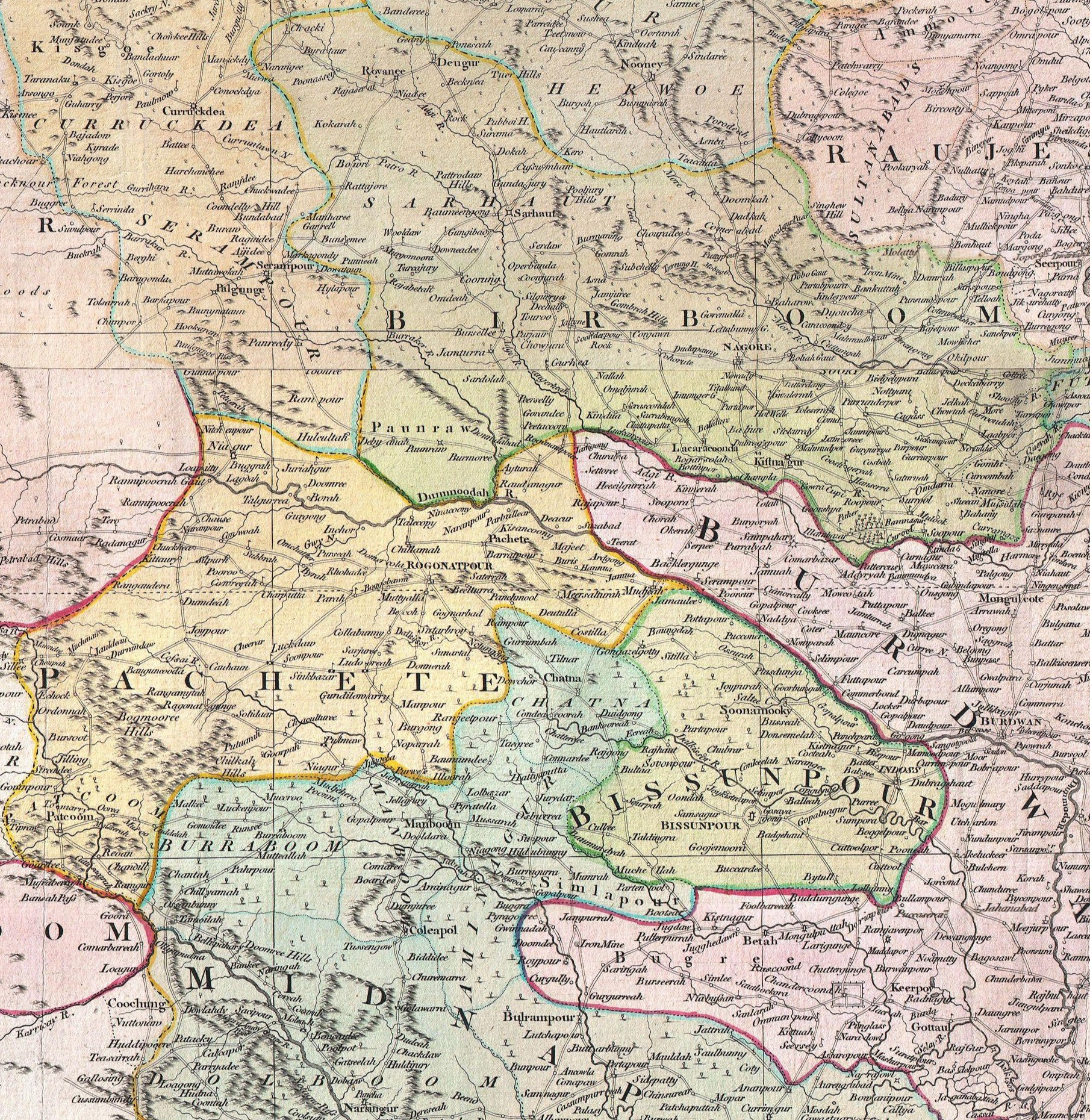
Bankura Forest area as depicted on a 1776 map by James Rennell.

Bankura Forest is a protected forest in Bengal, India. Officers from the Indian Forest Service and state service who have been posted to the district control the administration and provide people-centric services from the headquarters at Bankura. The total forest area of Bankura District, which comprises three divisions, Bankura (North) Division, Bankura (South) Division and Panchet Division, is about 1463.56 km^{2}, covering 21.27% percent of the total land area of the district. There are 0.046 ha of forest per capita in the district, whereas the figure is 0.02 ha for the whole of West Bengal. The forest comprises 44.48 km^{2}of reserved forest, 1391.95 km^{2} of protected forest, and 27.13 km^{2} of unclassified state forest.

Prior to India's independence, the West Bengal government had decided to create a Forest Administration to provide conservation and management for forest flora and fauna and deliver environmental services to those living in and around the forests.

The majority of the population in the forest depend on it for various purposes like grazing, firewood, and collecting of sal leaves and seeds and mushrooms, etc. With high human pressure on the forests, some minimum amount of forest degradation is almost unavoidable. However, a Joint Forest Management effort is underway to promote the conservation of the forest.

== See also ==
- Jungle Mahals
- Mallabhum kingdom
