= Bankura Municipality =

Civic body in West Bengal, India

Type
- Type: Municipality

History
- Founded: 1865; 161 years ago

Leadership
- Chairman: Aloka Sen Majumder, AITC
- Vice Chairman: Hiralal Chattaraj, AITC

Structure
- Seats: 24
- Political groups: Government (19): AITC (21); Opposition (3): BJP (1); IND (2)

Elections
- Last election: 2022
- Next election: 2027

Website
- bankuramunicipality.org

Bankura Municipality is the civic body that governs Bankura city of Bankura Sadar subdivision in Bankura district, West Bengal, India.

== History ==
Bankura municipality was established in 1865.

== Geography ==
Bankura Municipality covers an area of 19.01 km^{2} and has a total population of 137,386 (2011).

== Current members ==
Bankura Municipality has a total of 24 members or councillors, who are directly elected after a term of 5 years. The council is led by the chairperson. The latest elections were held on 12 February 2022. The current chairman of Bankura Municipality is Aloka Sen Majumdar of the Trinamool Congress. The current vice chairman is Hiralal Chattaraj of the Trinamool Congress.

Chairman: Aloka Sen Majumdar
Vice Chairman: Hiralal Chattaraj
Ward No.	Name of Councillor	Party	Remarks
1	Debasish Laha	Independent	
2	Rajib Dey	Trinamool Congress	
3	Jhilli Dutta Das	Trinamool Congress	
4	Amrita Garai Kundu	Trinamool Congress	
5	Swarna Das	Trinamool Congress	
6	Rekha Das Rajak	Trinamool Congress	
7	Dilip Agarwal	Independent	
8	Mamata Bagdi	Trinamool Congress	
9	Bhramar Chowdhury	Trinamool Congress	
10	Daripa Shampa	Trinamool Congress	
11	Aloka Sen Majumdar	Trinamool Congress	
12	Tapas Kumar Banerjee	Trinamool Congress	
13	Barun Kumar Sen	Trinamool Congress	
14	Aparna Chatterjee	Trinamool Congress	
15	Pinki Chakraborty	Trinamool Congress	
16	Sonai Ghoshal	Trinamool Congress	
17	Bandana Lohar	Trinamool Congress	
18	Ananya Roy Chakraborty	Bharatiya Janata Party	Elected as Independent; later joined BJP
19	Sheikh Azizul Rahaman	Trinamool Congress	
20	Avijit Datta	Trinamool Congress	
21	Amit Ruidas	Trinamool Congress	
22	Raju Lohar	Trinamool Congress	
23	Itu Das	Trinamool Congress	
24	Hiralal Chattaraj	Trinamool Congress	

== Elections ==
=== 2022 ===
Bankura Municipality
Party	Won	+/−
Trinamool Congress	21	
Independents	3	
Total	24	
