= Bolpur Municipality =

Type
- Type: Municipality

History
- Founded: 1950; 76 years ago

Leadership
- Chairman: Parna Ghosh, AITC
- Vice Chairman: Omar Sheikh, AITC

Structure
- Seats: 22
- Political groups: Government (18): AITC (18); Opposition (1): BJP (1)

Elections
- Last election: 27 February 2022
- Next election: 2027

Website
- bolpurmunicipality.org

Bolpur Municipality is the civic body that governs Bolpur city in Birbhum district, West Bengal, India.

== History ==
Bolpur Municipality was established in 1950.

== Geography ==
Bolpur Municipality covers an area of 117.20 km^{2} and has a total population of 80,210 (2011).

== Current members ==
Bolpur Municipality has a total of 22 members or councillors, who are directly elected after a term of 5 years. The council is led by the chairperson. The latest elections were held on 12 February 2022. The current chairperson of Bolpur Municipality is Parna Ghosh of the Trinamool Congress. The current deputy chairperson is Omar Sheikh of the Trinamool Congress.

Chairperson: Parna Ghosh
Deputy Chairperson: Omar Sheikh
Ward No.	Name of Councillor	Party	Remarks
1	Retun Kundu	Trinamool Congress	
2	Soma Pandit	Trinamool Congress	
3	Biswanath Chatterjee	Trinamool Congress	
4	Mamata Mukherjee	Trinamool Congress	
5	Ram Prasad Dolui	Trinamool Congress	
6	Swapan Kumar Nandi	Trinamool Congress	
7	Aparajita Roy	Trinamool Congress	
8	Sheikh Shukur Ali	Trinamool Congress	
9	Mita Dey	Trinamool Congress	
10	Tushar Karfa	Trinamool Congress	
11	Sanjoy Ghorui	Trinamool Congress	
12	Tripti Kundu	Trinamool Congress	
13	Rathindra Nath Das	Trinamool Congress	
14	Hasan Ali	Trinamool Congress	
15	Sanjoy Das	Trinamool Congress	
16	Samir Bhandari	Trinamool Congress	
17	Ruma Karmakar	Trinamool Congress	
18	Pradip Singha Roy	Trinamool Congress	
19	Biswajit Ghosh	Bharatiya Janata Party	
