= Sonamukhi Municipality =

Municipality in West Bengal

Type
- Type: Municipality

History
- Founded: 1885; 141 years ago

Leadership
- Chairman: Santosh Mukherjee, AITC

Structure
- Seats: 15
- Political groups: Government (19): AITC (19); Opposition (3): BJP (2); INC (1); Others (1): IND (1)

Elections
- Last election: 2022
- Next election: 2027

Website
- sonamukhimunicipality.org

Sonamukhi Municipality is the civic body that governs Sonamukhi town of Bankura district, West Bengal, India.

== History ==
Sonamukhi municipality was established in 1885.

== Geography ==
Sonamukhi Municipality covers an area of 8.56 sq km and has a total population of 29,085 (2011).

== Current members ==
Sonamukhi Municipality has a total of 24 members or councillors, who are directly elected after a term of 5 years. The council is led by the Chairperson. The latest elections were held on 12 February 2022. The current chairperson of Sonamukhi Municipality is Santosh Mukherjee of the Trinamool Congress. The current deputy chairperson is Hiralal Chattaraj of the Trinamool Congress.

Chairperson: Santosh Mukherjee
Deputy Chairperson:
Ward No.	Name of Councillor	Party	Remarks
1	Retun Kundu	Trinamool Congress	
2	Soma Pandit	Trinamool Congress	
3	Biswanath Chatterjee	Trinamool Congress	
4	Mamata Mukherjee	Trinamool Congress	
5	Ram Prasad Dolui	Trinamool Congress	
6	Swapan Kumar Nandi	Trinamool Congress	
7	Aparajita Roy	Trinamool Congress	
8	Sheikh Shukur Ali	Trinamool Congress	
9	Mita Dey	Trinamool Congress	
10	Tushar Karfa	Trinamool Congress	
11	Sanjoy Ghorui	Trinamool Congress	
12	Tripti Kundu	Trinamool Congress	
13	Rathindra Nath Das	Trinamool Congress	
14	Hasan Ali	Trinamool Congress	
15	Sanjoy Das	Trinamool Congress	
