= Berhampore Municipality =

Municipal body in West Bengal, India

Type
- Type: Municipality

History
- Founded: 1876; 150 years ago

Leadership
- Chairman: Naru Gopal Mukherjee, AITC
- Vice Chairman: Swarup Saha, AITC

Structure
- Seats: 28
- Political groups: Government (22): AITC (22); Opposition (6): INC (6)

Elections
- Last election: 2022
- Next election: 2027

Website
- www.berhamporemunicipality.org.in

Berhampore Municipality (or Baharampur Municipality) is the civic body that governs Berhampore city of Berhampore subdivision in Murshidabad district, West Bengal, India.

== History ==
Berhampore municipality was established in 1876.

== Geography ==
Berhampore Municipality covers an area of 31.42 km^{2} and has a total population of 1,95,223 (2011).

== Current members ==
Berhampore Municipality has a total of 28 members or councillors, who are directly elected after a term of 5 years. The council is led by the chairperson. The latest elections were held on 12 February 2022. The current chairman of Berhampore Municipality is Naru Gopal Mukherjee of the Trinamool Congress. The current vice chairman is Swarup Saha of the Trinamool Congress.

Chairman: Naru Gopal Mukherjee
Vice Chairman: Swarup Saha
Ward No.	Name of Councillor	Party	Remarks
1	Kakali Goswami	Trinamool Congress	
2	Baban Ray	Trinamool Congress	
3	Uma Ghosh	Trinamool Congress	
4	Hira Haldar	Indian National Congress	
5	Kanai Ray	Indian National Congress	
6	Kanika Kundu	Indian National Congress	
7	Naru Gopal Mukherjee	Trinamool Congress	
8	Babita Bhalla	Trinamool Congress	
9	Swarup Saha	Trinamool Congress	
10	Avik Chowdhury	Trinamool Congress	
11	Aparna Sharma	Trinamool Congress	
12	Ajoy Roy	Trinamool Congress	
13	Apurba Das	Trinamool Congress	
14	Rita Halder Chatterjee	Trinamool Congress	
15	Subrata Das	Trinamool Congress	
16	Arun Kumar Singh	Trinamool Congress	
17	Shukla Sarkar	Indian National Congress	
18	Jayanta Chakraborty	Trinamool Congress	
19	Vismadeb Karmakar	Trinamool Congress	
20	Gopa Halder	Indian National Congress	
21	Subal Ray	Trinamool Congress	
22	Debasish Goyala	Trinamool Congress	
23	Soumima Chattaraj	Trinamool Congress	
24	Jayanta Pramanik	Trinamool Congress	
25	Goutam Kumar Saha	Trinamool Congress	
26	Moumita Ray Choudhuri	Trinamool Congress	
27	Ranajit Singh	Indian National Congress	
28	Abul Kowsar	Trinamool Congress	

== Elections ==
=== 2022 ===
Berhampore Municipality
Party	Won	+/−
Trinamool Congress	22	
Indian National Congress	6	
Total	28	

== See also ==
- Beldanga Municipality
- Dhulian Municipality
- Murshidabad Municipality
- Jangipur Municipality
- Kandi Municipality
- Jiaganj Azimganj Municipality
