= Balurghat Municipality =

Coordinates: 25.22955°N 88.77777°E

Type
- Type: Municipality

History
- Founded: 1951; 75 years ago

Leadership
- Chairman: Ashok Mitra, AITC

Structure
- Seats: 25
- Political groups: Government (19): AITC (19); Opposition (3): BJP (2); INC (1); Others (1): IND (1)

Elections
- Last election: 2022
- Next election: 2027

Website
- www.balurghatmunicipality.org

Balurghat Municipality is the civic body that governs Balurghat city of Dakshin Dinajpur district, West Bengal, India.

== History ==
Alipurduar municipality was established on 7 February 1957.

== Geography ==
Balurghat Municipality covers an area of 8.98 km^{2} and has a total population of 65,232 (2011).

== Current members ==
Balurghat Municipality has a total of 25 members or councillors, who are directly elected after a term of 5 years. The council is led by the chairperson. The latest elections were held on 12 February 2022. The current chairperson of Arambagh Municipality is Samir Bhandari of the Trinamool Congress. The current deputy chairperson is Mamata Mukherjee of the Trinamool Congress.

Chairperson: Samir Bhandari
Deputy Chairperson: Mamata Mukherjee
| Ward No. | Name of Councillor | Party | Remarks |
|---|---|---|---|
| 1 | Retun Kundu | Trinamool Congress | |
| 2 | Soma Pandit | Trinamool Congress | |
| 3 | Biswanath Chatterjee | Trinamool Congress | |
| 4 | Mamata Mukherjee | Trinamool Congress | |
| 5 | Ram Prasad Dolui | Trinamool Congress | |
| 6 | Swapan Kumar Nandi | Trinamool Congress | |
| 7 | Aparajita Roy | Trinamool Congress | |
| 8 | Sheikh Shukur Ali | Trinamool Congress | |
| 9 | Mita Dey | Trinamool Congress | |
| 10 | Tushar Karfa | Trinamool Congress | |
| 11 | Sanjoy Ghorui | Trinamool Congress | |
| 12 | Tripti Kundu | Trinamool Congress | |
| 13 | Rathindra Nath Das | Trinamool Congress | |
| 14 | Hasan Ali | Trinamool Congress | |
| 15 | Sanjoy Das | Trinamool Congress | |
| 16 | Samir Bhandari | Trinamool Congress | |
| 17 | Ruma Karmakar | Trinamool Congress | |
| 18 | Pradip Singha Roy | Trinamool Congress | |
| 19 | Biswajit Ghosh | Bharatiya Janata Party | |
