= Beldanga Municipality =

Type
- Type: Municipality

History
- Founded: 1981; 45 years ago

Leadership
- Chairman: Anuradha Banerjee, AITC
- Vice Chairman: Abu Sufiyan, AITC

Structure
- Seats: 14
- Political groups: Government (7): AITC (7); Opposition (7): BJP (3); IND (4)

Elections
- Last election: 12 February 2022
- Next election: 2027

Website
- municipalitybeldanga.org

Beldanga Municipality is the civic body that governs Beldanga town of Berhampore subdivision in Murshidabad district, West Bengal, India.

== History ==
Beldanga municipality was established in 1981.

== Geography ==
Beldanga Municipality covers an area of 3.98 km^{2} and has a total population of 29,182 (2011).

== Current members ==
Beldanga Municipality has a total of 24 members or councillors, who are directly elected after a term of 5 years. The council is led by the chairperson. The latest elections were held on 12 February 2022. The current chairman of Beldanga Municipality is Anuradha Banerjee of the Trinamool Congress. The current vice chairman is Abu Sufiyan of the Trinamool Congress.

Chairman: Anuradha Banerjee
Vice Chairman: Abu Sufiyan
Ward No.	Name of Councillor	Party	Remarks
1	Tahamina Bibi	Trinamool Congress	
2	Anurupa Bhaduri	Bharatiya Janata Party	
3	Ashma Ara	Independent	
4	Santosh Jhawar	Independent	
5	Biswanath Mondal	Trinamool Congress	
6	Anwara Bibi	Trinamool Congress	
7	Din Mohammad Sheikh	Trinamool Congress	
8	Rabindranath Malakar	Independent	
9	Barkat Sheikh	Trinamool Congress	
10	Anuradha Banerjee	Trinamool Congress	
11	Alok Ghosh	Bharatiya Janata Party	
12	Abu Sufiyan	Trinamool Congress	
13	Santana Ghosh	Bharatiya Janata Party	
14	Bharat Jhawar	Independent	

== Elections ==
=== 2022 ===
Beldanga Municipality
Party	Won	+/−
Trinamool Congress	7	
Independent	4	
Bharatiya Janata Party	3	
Total	14	

== See also ==
- Berhampore Municipality
- Dhulian Municipality
- Murshidabad Municipality
- Jangipur Municipality
- Kandi Municipality
- Jiaganj Azimganj Municipality
