= Culture of Bankura district =

Culture of Bankura district refers to the culture of Bankura district (as it existed in 2011) in the Indian state of West Bengal.

== Background ==
As the Bankura district and adjoining areas, forming a part of ancient Rarh, were inhabited from pre-historic times by Austroloid and Dravidian tribes who were subsequently assimilated with the people and culture of the Indo-Europeans or Aryans, who prevailed in northern India, cultural traces of all these groups are visible in Bankura district to the present day.

Initially, there were two primary groups, the Nishadas (who were Proto-Australoid tribes) and Dasa-dasyus (related to Dravidians). Amongst the subgroups were Bagdi, Bauri, Jele, Hari, Dom, and others. Around three-fourths of the Santals living in West Bengal, live in the Rarh region. Many of these peoples were initially martial races and were great heroes at some point of history. It is not that they form a majority in the district or region but they are substantial in numbers and probably were comparatively more numerous as a proportion of the total population in earlier days. Over the ages these people have exerted tremendous influence in shaping the folk culture of the region. The area was widely influenced by Jainism, Buddhism and Shaivite thinking prior to the conversion of Bir Hambir to Vaishnavism. There were traces of Vaishnavism even in earlier days but since Bir Hambir's conversion it became the dominant influence in the region. Thus various historical factors have shaped the culture of Bankura district.

== Temples ==
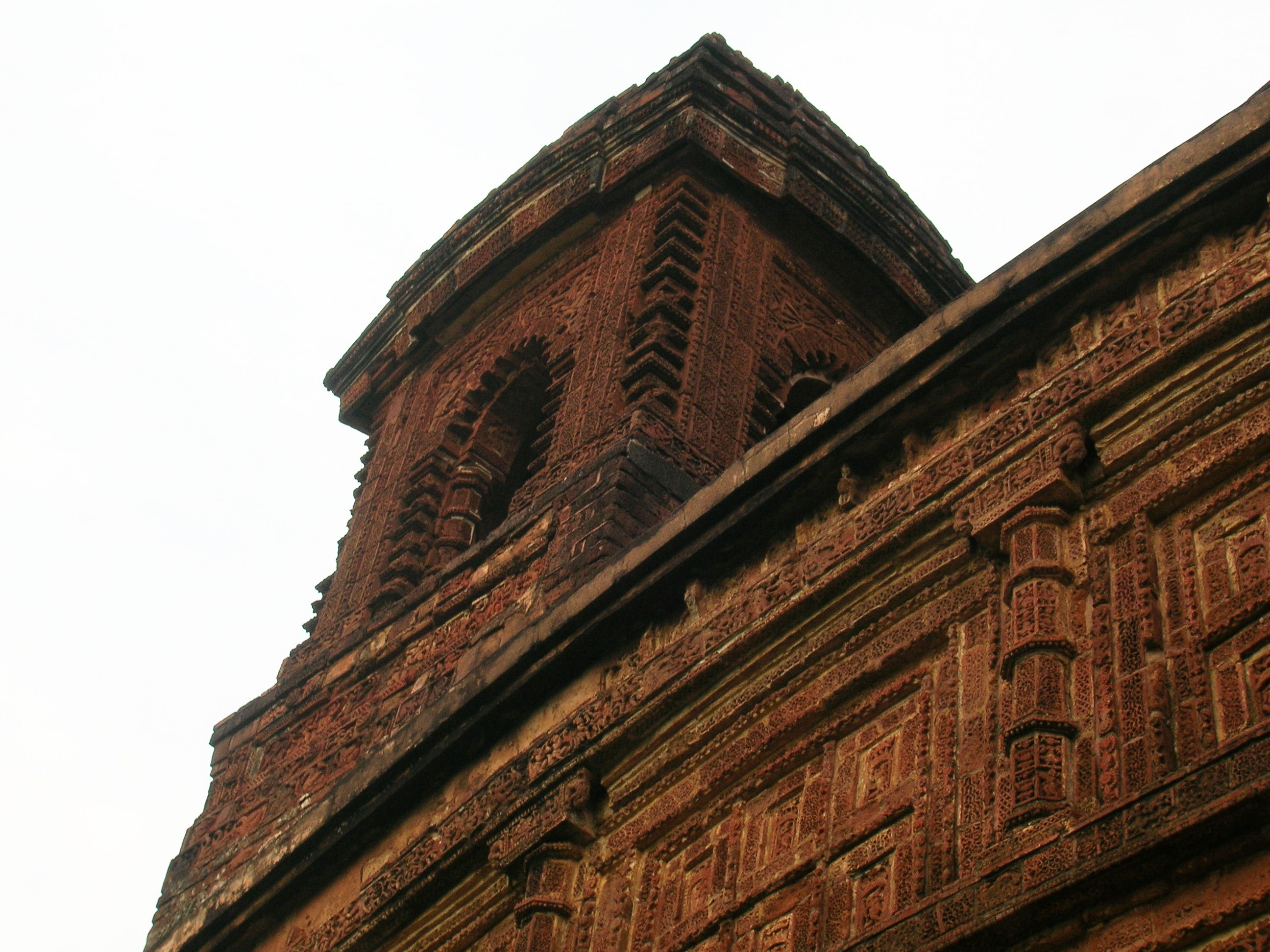
Shyam Ray Temple, Bishnupur.

Bankura district is a land of temples. There are more historical temples in Bishnupur than in any other place in West Bengal. There are several aspects of temple art, architecture and construction that need to be considered.

Almost all temples in Bishnupur town are Vaishnavite, but many of those scattered in different areas of the district spread outside the town are Shaivite, with traces of Jainism and Buddhism. While some of the older temples were built of laterite the area has numerous brick built temples, some with exquisite terracotta carvings. Terracotta carvings are also found in some temples outside the district, as for example at Jaydev Kenduli or Antpur, but the art of terracotta carvings seems to have flourished with the rise of the Rajas of Bishnupur and virtually died out with the fading of their supremacy. Some of the earlier temples built by the Bardhaman Raj have terracotta carvings, possibly by artisans from Bankura district, but by the time Rani Rashmoni decided to construct the Dakshineswar Kali Temple, in the mid nineteenth century, the art of terracotta carvings had obviously faded out.

While Bankura district has some fine examples of rekha deul temples built in what is popularly known as the Kalinga architecture of Orissa, as for example at Bahulara, but it is the Bengal style of architecture that attracts attention in the district. The Shyamrai temple built by Raghunath Singh in 1643 is perhaps the oldest pancharatna temple in Bengal. With curved roofs in thatched style, it has one deul in the centre and one in each corner. The Jor Bangla temple was built in 1655 also by Raghunath Singh. It is a fine example of the Bengal style of temple architecture. Gods and goddesses were thought of as being close to human beings and as such placed in temples that resembled human habitation, the hut with thatched roof.

Four distinct types of temples may be distinguished in Bishnupur. The first has a single square on a curved roof and is represented by Malleswar temple. The second has a single tower on a curved roof. The best examples of this are Madan Mohan temple in brick and in laterite Lalji and Radha Shyam temples. The pancharatna temple has five towers on a curved roof. The best examples are Shyam Rai temple in brick and Madan Gopal temple in laterite. The fourth type is the Jor Bangla type with two buildings shaped like a typical Bengal hut joined together with a small tower on top. It is the most interesting one from the architectural point of view. The Shyam Rai temple has the finest specimens of carved tiles.

It needs to be mentioned that the powerful Rajas of Bishnupur had a non-descript single storied palace, not even comparable to the Rajbaris of many a somewhat ordinary zamindar in Bengal. Even the fort at Bishnupur seems to have been constructed for the protection of temples.

== Fort and Rasmancha ==
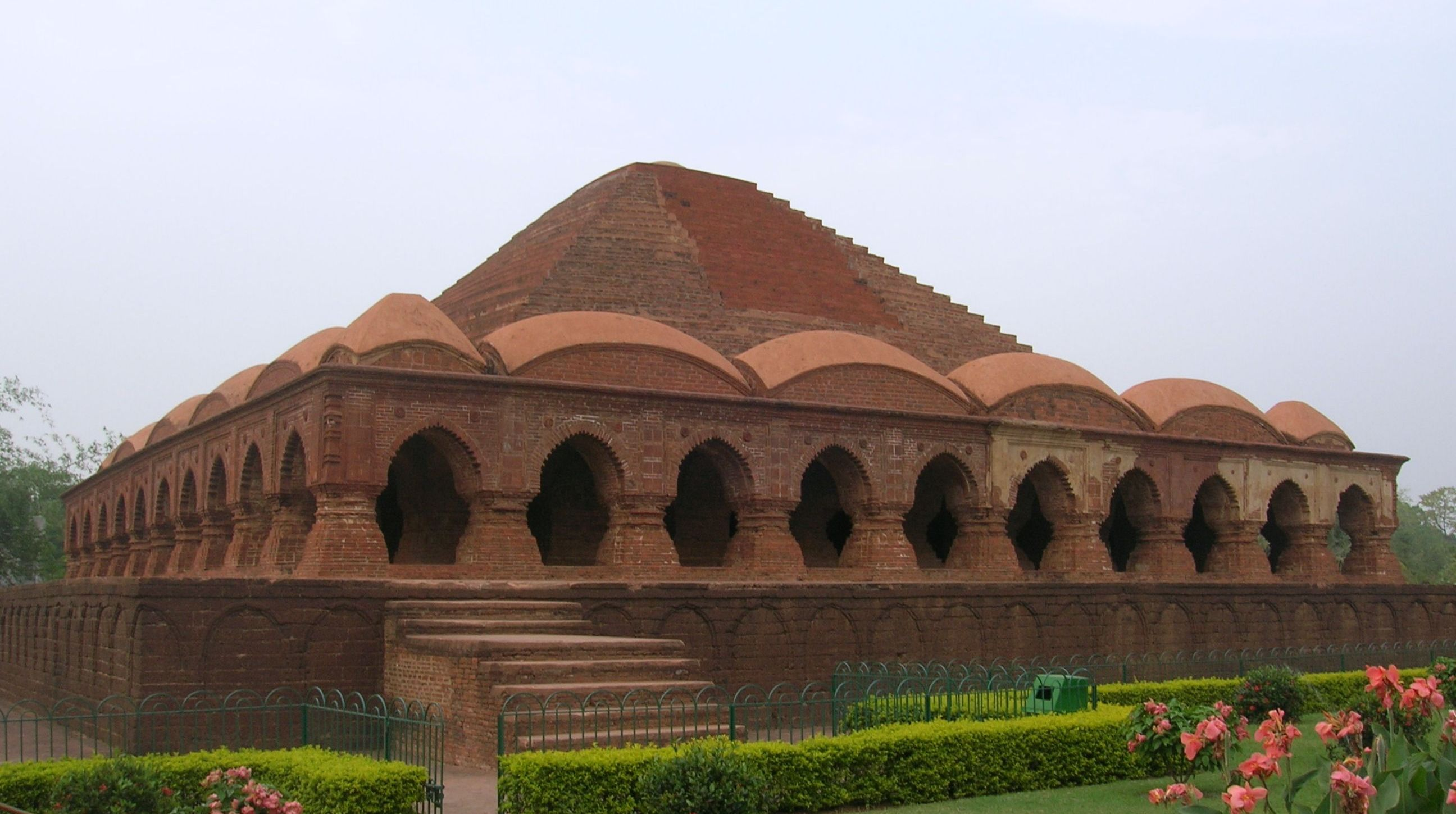
Rasmancha

The fort has a high earthen wall and a moat around it. The approach is through the Pathar Darja, a large laterite gateway with arrow slits. In the western part of the fort is a building with four solid walls and no entrance except from top. It has no roof. It is believed to have been a dungeon where criminals were thrown in. There are a number of cannons, including the famous Dalmardan (commonly pronounced Dalmadal).

The Rasmancha consists of a square chamber surrounded on each side by three galleries with ten, eight and five arched openings respectively, covered by a pyramidal roof. It was earlier used for putting up idols during the Ras festival.

== Handicrafts ==
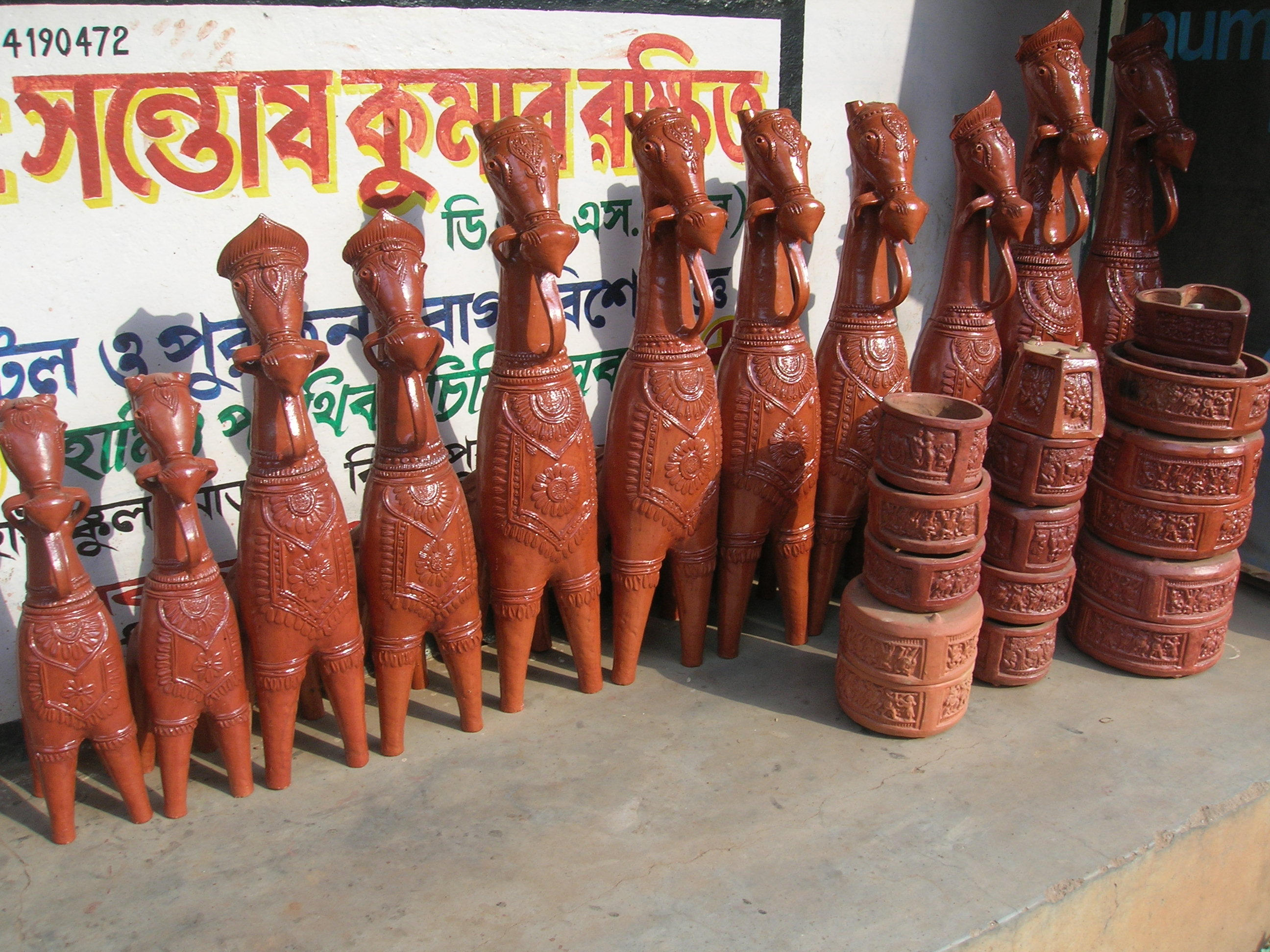
Bankura horses

Bankura district produces a number of terracotta handicrafts, the most popular being the Bankura horse. It has been praised for "its elegant stance and unique abstraction of basic values". Originally used for village rituals, it now adorns drawing rooms across the world as symbols of Indian folk-art. It is the logo of All India Handicrafts. The principal centres where the terracotta horses and elephants are produced are Panchmura, Rajagram, Sonamukhi and Hamirpur. Each place has its local style. The Panchmura-style of pottery is considered the best and the finest of all the four types.

Another popular product is the manasachali. The potters of Sonamukhi and Panchmura turn out thousands of manasachali for worshipping Manasa or the snake goddess.

Among other forms of handicrafts prevalent in Bankura are: dhokra, wood carving, conch-shell, stone carving, bamboo craft, bell metal, bel mala, dasabatar playing cards, and lanterns. The Dashabatar Tash of Bishnupur is a distinctive form of painted playing cards depicting the ten incarnations of Vishnu, and its production developed as part of the region's traditional craft culture.

== Handloom textiles ==
One of the most expensive saris in India, called the Baluchari Saris, are created by craftsmen of Bishnupur. When, with the advent of the British, the Baluchari started declining in Murshidadabad, its original home, Subho Tagore, painter, art-collector and nephew of Rabindranath Tagore, invited Akshay Kumar Das, a master weaver of Bishnupur to learn the intricacies of jacquard weaving. The latter infused the Baluchari into the rich traditions of silk weaving at Bishnupur. The silk strands are dyed separately and then put into a loom. Designs are woven with the help of a series of punch cards that are hung from the top of the loom. Mythological stories that formed the wall sculpture in many a temple in Bishnupur, found their way on to the body of the sari. One sari may have an entire episode from the Mahabharata woven into its border and pallu.

Apart from Baluchari and Swarnachuri saris, which are often produced with tussar silk, the main cotton products of Bankura district are bed sheets, bed covers, gamchha, towels, window and door curtains, kachha dhuti and saris of coarser variety.

== Fairs and festivals ==
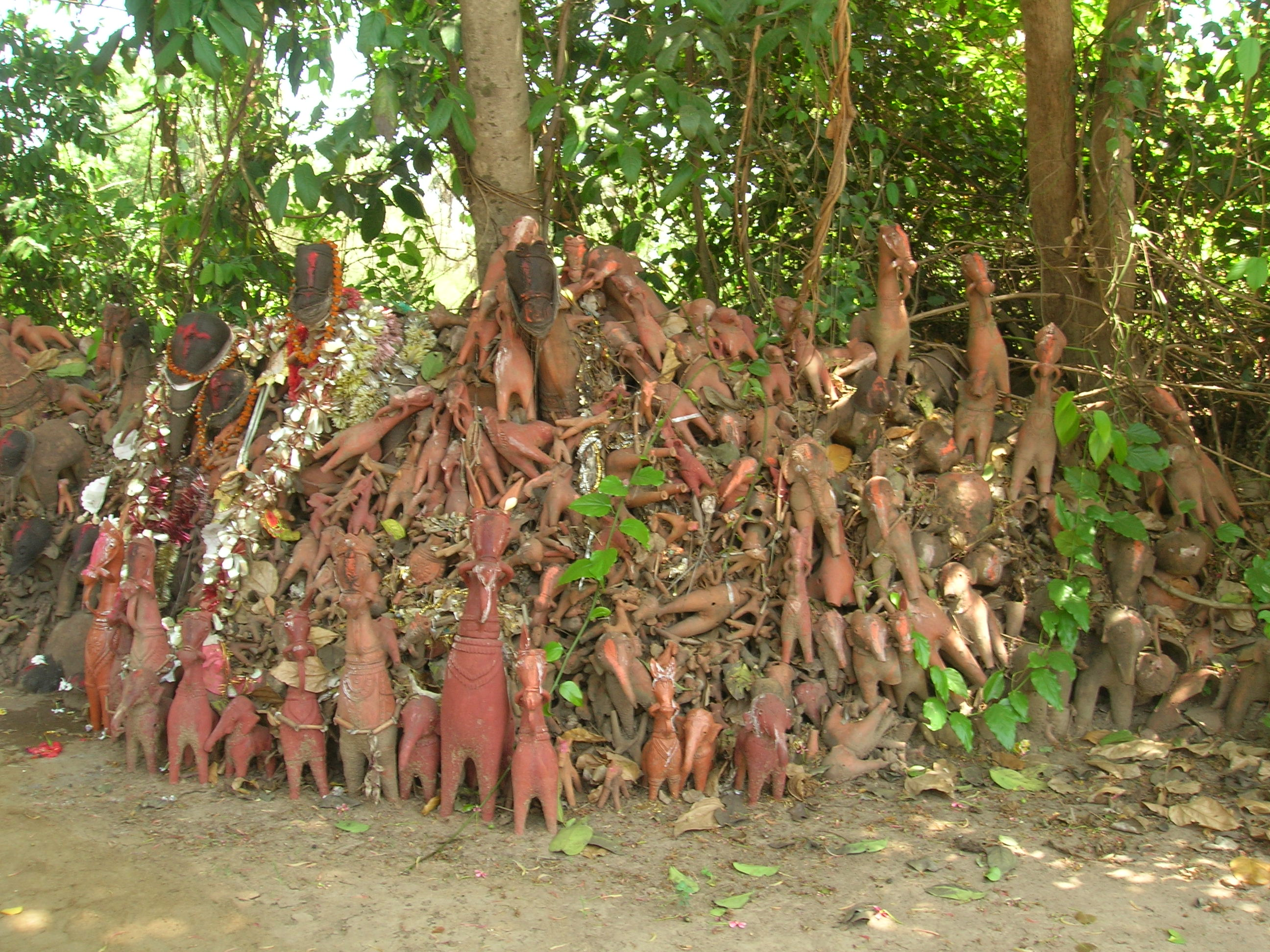
Dharmarajtala, place for Dharma worship in a Bankura village.

The fairs of Bankura are often organised in consonance with religious festivities. Examples of such fairs and festivities are Choitro Gajan of Ekteswar and Dharmarajer Gajan of Beliatore. The major Hindu festivals such as Durga Puja, Kali Puja, Lakshmi Puja and Saraswati Puja are celebrated with pomp and grandeur. Major festivals of other religions, such as Eid al-Adha, Eid ul-Fitr, Vaisakhi, Budha Purnima, and Christmas are also celebrated. Other important fairs and festivals are – Ras Utsab of Bishnupur, Kaliyadaman of Jagadallah and Purandarpur, Pirer Utsab of Indas, Basuli Mela of Chhatna and Dhara Utsab of Susunia. Bhadu Puja and Tusu Puja find wide participation of women.

Jhapan festival, dedicated to the snake goddess Manasa, is observed on the last day of Srabon in the western fringe of the state with a high concentration of tribal population. Idols of Manasa, specially made for the occasion, are carried round the village. The day is also of great significance for snake charmers in the region with some kissing their snakes.

Bishnupur Mela is being organised by the state government from 23 to 27 December from 1988, near the Madanmohana Temple. About 3-400,000 people visit the mela. Besides display and sale of handicraft items, cultural programmes including folk songs, are organized on three stages simultaneously, portraying the rich cultural heritage of this part of Rarh Bhumi. Sonamukhi is also famous for Kali and Kartik Festival.

Bankura Book Fair is organised in December every year.

See also - Bankura Book Fair 2008 pictures

See also - Bishnupur Fair 2008 pictures

== Music ==
The Bishnupur Gharana follows the Dhrupad tradition of Hindustani classical music. The gharana originated amongst the court musicians of the Rajas of Bishnupur, around the 14th century. It is said to be the only gharana developed exclusively in West Bengal.

During the reign of Mughal emperor Aurangazeb, the oppressive environment in field of art and culture, lead many musicians to the court at Bishnupur. Amongst them was the famous Dhrupad vocalist and dextrous instrumentalist Bahadur Khan, who was welcomed by Raghunath Singh Deo II and honoured as a court musician.

Historical evidence points to Pt. Ramachandra Bhattacharya, a disciple of Ud. Bahadur Khan, as the founder of the Bishnupur Gharana. In the later part of the eighteenth century and towards the early and mid-nineteenth century, when music of different gharanas was gradually veering around the Khyal style Indian classical music, the Dhrupad style continued flourishing in Bishnupur. It is simple, and devoid of heavy and complicated ornamentation. It has developed its own style with regard to rhythm.

A number of musicians played a role in the evolution and development of the gharana, namely Gadadhar Chakraborty, Krishna Mohan Goswami, Ram Sankar Bhattacharya and his son Ram Keshab Bhattacharya. They were some of the early exponents. Then appeared Jadu Bhatta (Jadunath Bhattacharya), who raised this music to a higher level and made it well known throughout India. Dinabandhu Goswami, Ananta Lal Bandyopadhyay. Rama Prasanna Bandyopadhyay, Radhika Prasad Goswami, Gopeshwar Bandyopadhyay, Surendranath Bandyopadhyay were the next generation musicians, all of whom were great exponents of Bishnupur Gharana. The disciples of Rama Prasanna Bandyopadhyay, Gokul Nag (sitar) and Asesh Chandra Bandyopadhyay (esraj) carried the reputation of Bishnupur Gharana to a higher standard. Bankura do known for its Rock music love, Events like Rock Fest 2011-2013, Valentine Fever 1-4(2014-2017, Project Agomoni 2014-2017, Noise Reduction 2017 & many more are there. There are few promising rock bands like Rusty nails, White shadow, The Living Word, Limit State, Abhisek & Friends, Crust, Operating System, Umeed. Some well recognised musicians such Shyam ji, Dipak Kumar Tudu, Siddhartha Chatterjee and many more. Anirban Sengupta AKA Bubkka and Rishi Mukherjee plays an important role in developing the bangla rock music culture in this City by Organizing Music fest like Bankura Rock Fest & Valentine Fever.

== Literature ==
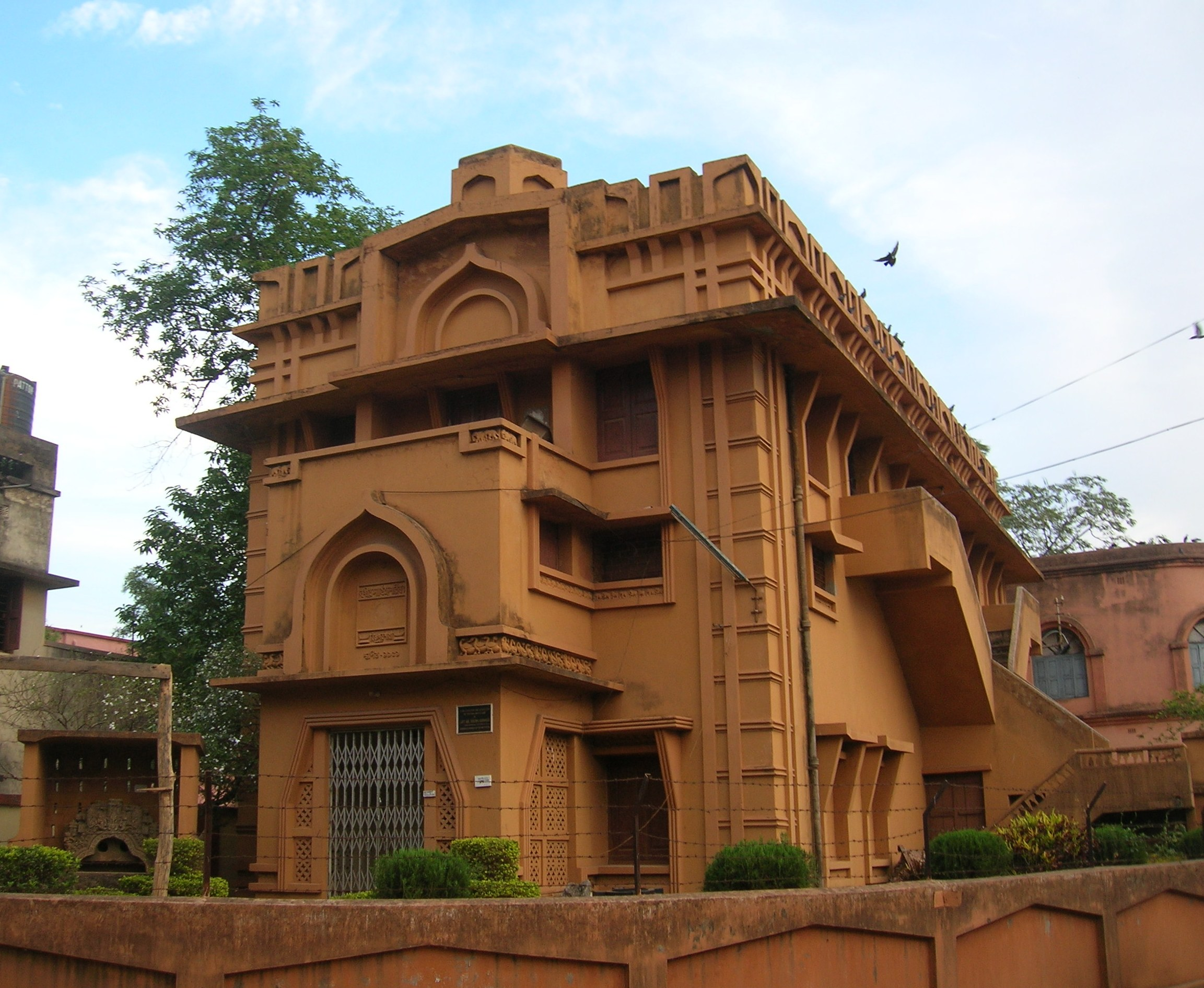
Acharya Jogesh Chandra Purakriti Bhaban (Museum), Bishnupur.

A large number of literary little magazines are published in Bengali from Bankura district. Amongst the little magazines are: Aaddaa, Aalor Shisu, Aarja (quarterly published since 1979), Columbus (quarterly published since 1980), Kabitaa Dash Dine, Kaanchan, Kolaaj, Kheyaali (quarterly published since 1981), Graamin Maatir Gandha, Deepti (quarterly published since 1987), Tulsi Chandan (quarterly published since 1982), Pragati, Manikaustav (monthly published since 1981), Jaameeni (bi-monthly published since 1976), Raamkinkar, Lagnausha (quarterly published since 1979), Lokaayata, Shatadal (quarterly published since 1981), Samakriti, Sat (annual published since 1988), and Mukta Kanthaswar (quarterly published since 1988) Pipilika ( tri monthly published from 2016).

== Art ==
Jamini Roy (1887–1972), one of the most celebrated artists of modern India, was born in a remote village of Bankura district.

Ram Kinker Baij (1910–1980), the earliest Indian artist to experiment with abstract sculptural forms, was born in Bankura.
