= Jhargram Municipality =

Municipal Corporation in West Bengal, India

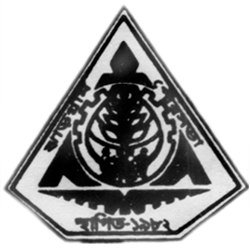
- Coat of Arms

Type
- Type: Municipality

History
- Founded: 1982; 44 years ago

Leadership
- Chairman: Smt. Kabita Ghosh, AITC
- Vice Chairman: Smt. Sukhi Saren, AITC

Structure
- Seats: 18
- Political groups: Government (16): AITC (16); Opposition (2): CPI (1); Other (1): IND (1)

Elections
- Last election: 2022
- Next election: 2027

Meeting place
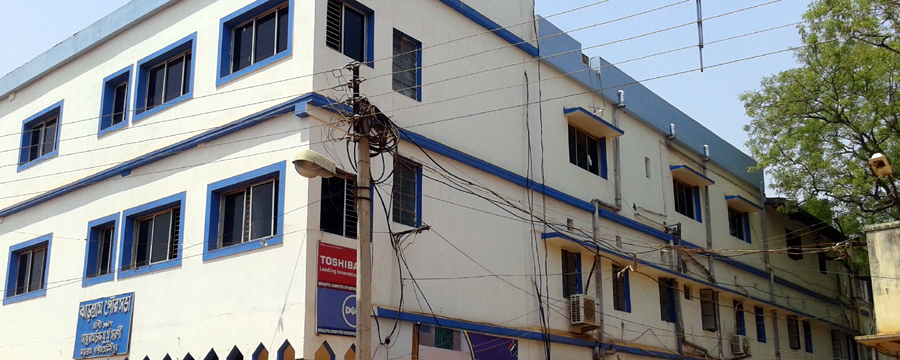
- Municipality Building

Website
- www.jhargrammunicipality.org

Jhargram Municipality is responsible for the civic infrastructure and administration of the town of Jhargram, West Bengal, India.

== Structure ==
Established in 1982, the municipality refers to the board of councillors, with one councillor being elected from each of the 18 wards of Jhargram town. The board of councillors elects a chairman from among its elected members.

According to the West Bengal Municipal Act, 1993, Jhargram municipality is run by the chairman-in-council system of governance and consists of the chairman, the vice-chairman, and chief executive officer. The chairman is the executive head of the municipality and the municipal administration is under his control. The chairman nominates the chairman-in-council and distributes the various functions of the municipality. The chairman presides over the meetings of the chairman-in-council as well as the board of councillors, and in his absence, the vice-chairman chairs the meetings. The administrative functions of the municipalities are dealt with through the committees and are headed by the chairman-in-council.
