= Daulatabad, Murshidabad =

Daulatabad
- Village
- Location in West Bengal, India Daulatabad (India)
- Coordinates: 24.1447°N 88.3808°E
- Country: India
- State: West Bengal
- District: Murshidabad

Population (2011)
  - Total: 5,761

Languages
  - Official: Bengali, English
- Time zone: UTC+5:30 (IST)
- Telephone/STD code: 03482
- Lok Sabha constituency: Baharampur
- Vidhan Sabha constituency: Baharampur
- Website: murshidabad.gov.in

Daulatabad is a village and gram panchayat, with a police station, in the Berhampore CD block in the Berhampore subdivision of Murshidabad district in the state of West Bengal, India.

== Geography ==
Cities, towns and locations in the Berhampore and Kandi subdivisions, Murshidabad district
M: municipal town, CT: census town, R: rural/ urban centre, H: historical centres
Owing to space constraints in the small map, the actual locations in a larger map may vary slightly

=== Location ===
Daulatabad is located at 24.1447°N 88.3808°E.

=== Area overview ===
The area shown in the map alongside, covering Berhampore and Kandi subdivisions, is spread across both the natural physiographic regions of the district, Rarh and Bagri. The headquarters of Murshidabad district, Berhampore, is in this area. The ruins of Karnasubarna, the capital of Shashanka, the first important king of ancient Bengal who ruled in the 7th century, is located 9.6 kilometres (6.0 mi) south-west of Berhampore. The entire area is overwhelmingly rural with over 80% of the population living in the rural areas.

Note: The map alongside presents some of the notable locations in the subdivisions. All places marked in the map are linked in the larger full screen map.

== Demographics ==
According to the 2011 Census of India, Daulatabad had a total population of 5,761, of which 2,967 (52%) were males and 2,794 (48%) were females. Population in the age range 0–6 years was 641. The total number of literate persons in Daulatabad was 3,844 (75.08% of the population over 6 years).

== Civic administration ==
=== Police station ===
Daulatabad police station has jurisdiction over a part of Berhampore CD block.

== Transport ==
State Highway 11, running from Mahammad Bazar (in Birbhum district) to Ranaghat (in Nadia district) passes through Daulatabad. This section is locally popular as Baharampur-Jalangi Road. Daulatabad is connected to Berhampore by SH11.The main way of transportation is by road.
