= Panchanantala (Berhampore) =

- Town
- Location in West Bengal, India
- Coordinates: 24.0961425°N 88.2658306°E
- Country: India
- State: West Bengal
- District: Murshidabad
- Elevation: 17 m (56 ft)

Population (2011)
  - Total: 2,000

Languages
  - Official: Bengali, English
- Time zone: UTC+5:30 (IST)
- Postal code: 742101
- Vehicle registration: WB
- Lok Sabha constituency: Baharampur
- Vidhan Sabha constituency: Baharampur

Panchanantala is a locality cum business area in Berhampore city. It is an important junction connecting National Highway 34 to State Highway 11. Panchanantala is part of the Census Town Sibdanga Badarpur(315446) and is under the Manindranagar Gram Pancahyat.

== Establishments ==
The Block Development Office, Murshidabad Zilla Parishad, Murshidabad District Primary School Council, BSF recruitment Office, Bhagirathi Milk Co-Operative etc. important Govt. offices are situated here.

== Education ==
Don Bosco School, Berhampore, founded in 2010, is a leading institute in this locality. Don Bosco School, shortly called DBS caters students upto class 10th.

The St. Teresa School in this locality has been shifted to the Karbala, another notable locality in this area.

== Commercial hub ==
The commercial area starts from Panchanantala which extends to Banjetia along the State Highway 11.

Another commercial hub starts from Panchanantala to Bhakuri along the National Highway 34.

== Connectivity ==
Panchanantala works as the gateway to the city. The eastern part of the Murshidabad District is linked to the western part through Panchanantala via State Highway 11. It is well connected by bus towards Kolkata or towards Siliguri (National Highway 34). The Berhampore Court Railway station is 2 km (1.2 mi) from Panchanantala. "Mohona", the central bus terminus of Berhampore is 1.4 km (0.87 mi) from Panchanantala bus stop.

== Restaurants and bar ==
Samrat and Sunshine two 3 star hotels serve the purpose of accommodation to the tourists who come for business or to visit Hazarduari—the most famous tourist attraction of the district. Hotel Samrat is the oldest hotel of Berhampore.

In recent years, another notable hotel named Nandini has started to serve tourists in this area.

== Media ==
The head office of the Prayas TV, a locally owned TV channel is located here.
