= Gopjan =

- Census Town
- Location in West Bengal, India Gopjan (India)
- Coordinates: 24.12479°N 88.23223°E
- State: West Bengal
- District: Murshidabad

Area
  - Total: 9.6248 km^{2} (3.7162 sq mi)

Population (2011)
  - Total: 23,415
  - Density: 2,432.8/km^{2} (6,300.9/sq mi)

Languages
  - Official: Bengali, English
- Time zone: UTC+5:30 (IST)
- PIN: 742102
- Telephone/STD code: 03482
- Vehicle registration: WB-57, WB-58
- Lok Sabha constituency: Baharampur
- Vidhan Sabha constituency: Baharampur
- Website: murshidbad.nic.in

Gopjan is a census town in the Berhampore CD block. It is located in the Berhampore subdivision of the Murshidabad district, in the state of West Bengal, India.

== Geography ==
Cities, towns and locations in the Berhampore and Kandi subdivisions, Murshidabad district
M: municipal town, CT: census town, R: rural/ urban centre, H: historical centres
Owing to space constraints in the small map, the actual locations in a larger map may vary slightly

=== Location ===
Gopjan is located at 24.12479°N 88.23223°E.

=== Area overview ===
The area shown in the map alongside, covering Berhampore and Kandi subdivisions, is spread across both the natural physiographic regions of the district, Rarh and Bagri. The headquarters of Murshidabad district, Berhampore, is in this area. The ruins of Karnasubarna, the capital of Shashanka, the first important king of ancient Bengal who ruled in the 7th century, is located 9.6 kilometres (6.0 mi) south-west of Berhampore. The entire area is overwhelmingly rural with over 80% of the population living in the rural areas.

Note: The map alongside presents some of the notable locations in the subdivisions. All places marked in the map are linked in the larger full screen map.

== Demographics ==
According to the 2011 Census of India, Gopjan had a total population of 23,415, of which 11,924 (51%) were males and 11,491 (49%) were females. Population in the age range 0–6 years was 2,744. The total number of literate persons in Gopjan was 15,925 (77.04% of the population 6 years).

== Infrastructure ==
According to the District Census Handbook, Murshidabad, 2011, Gopjan covered an area of 9.6248 km^{2}. It had 15 km roads with open drains. The protected water-supply involved overhead tank, tap water from treated source, hand pump. It had 2,239 domestic electric connections, 95 road lighting points. Among the medical facilities it had 2 nursing homes. Among the educational facilities, it had 8 primary schools, 3 middle schools, 2 secondary schools, 1 senior secondary school. Among the social, cultural and recreational facilities, it had 1 public library, 1 reading room. It had branch offices of 1 nationalised bank, 1 co-operative bank.

== Healthcare ==
Berhampore CD block is one of the areas of Murshidabad district where ground water is affected by high level of arsenic contamination. The WHO guideline for arsenic in drinking water is 10 mg/ litre, and the Indian Standard value is 50 mg/ litre. The maximum concentration in Berhampore CD block is 635 mg/litre.
