= Sibdanga Badarpur =

- Census Town
- Location in West Bengal, India Sibdanga Badarpur (India)
- Coordinates: 24.0975°N 88.2774°E
- State: West Bengal
- District: Murshidabad

Area
  - Total: 2.8146 km^{2} (1.0867 sq mi)

Population (2011)
  - Total: 12,829
  - Density: 4,558.0/km^{2} (11,805/sq mi)

Languages
  - Official: Bengali, English
- Time zone: UTC+5:30 (IST)
- PIN: 742102
- Telephone/STD code: 03482
- Vehicle registration: WB-57, WB-58
- Lok Sabha constituency: Baharampur
- Vidhan Sabha constituency: Baharampur
- Website: murshidbad.nic.in

Sibdanga Badarpur (also spelled Shibdanga Badarpur, also used shorter form Sibdanga/ Shibdanga) is a census town in the Berhampore CD block in the Berhampore subdivision of the Murshidabad district in the state of West Bengal, India.

== Geography ==
Cities, towns and locations in the Berhampore and Kandi subdivisions, Murshidabad district
M: municipal town, CT: census town, R: rural/ urban centre, H: historical centres
Owing to space constraints in the small map, the actual locations in a larger map may vary slightly

=== Location ===
Sibdanga Badarpur is located at 24.0975°N 88.2774°E.

=== Area overview ===
The area shown in the map alongside, covering Berhampore and Kandi subdivisions, is spread across both the natural physiographic regions of the district, Rarh and Bagri. The headquarters of Murshidabad district, Berhampore, is in this area. The ruins of Karnasubarna, the capital of Shashanka, the first important king of ancient Bengal who ruled in the 7th century, is located 9.6 kilometres (6.0 mi) south-west of Berhampore. The entire area is overwhelmingly rural with over 80% of the population living in the rural areas.

Note: The map alongside presents some of the notable locations in the subdivisions. All places marked in the map are linked in the larger full screen map.

== Demographics ==
According to the 2011 Census of India, Shibdanga Badarpur had a total population of 12,829, of which 6,516 (51%) were males and 6,313 (49%) were females. Population in the age range 0-6 years was 1,140. The total number of literate persons in Shibdanga Badarpur was 10,008 (85.62% of the population 6 years).

== Infrastructure ==
According to the District Census Handbook, Murshidabad, 2011, Sibdanga Badarpur covered an area of 2.8146 km^{2}. It had 16 km roads with both open and covered drains. The protected water-supply involved overhead tank, tank/pond/lake, hand pump. It had 512 domestic electric connections, 20 road lighting points. Among the medical facilities it had 2 charitable hospitals/ nursing homes, 13 medicine shops. Among the educational facilities, it had 2 primary schools, 1 secondary school, senior secondary school at Cossimbazar 3 km away, general degree college at Berhampore 5 km away. Among the social, cultural and recreational facilities, it had 1 working women's hostel, 7 old age homes. It produced nails, boards.

== Healthcare ==
Berhampore CD block is one of the areas of Murshidabad district where ground water is affected by high level of arsenic contamination. The WHO guideline for arsenic in drinking water is 10 mg/ litre, and the Indian Standard value is 50 mg/ litre. The maximum concentration in Berhampore CD block is 635 mg/litre.
