= Shine Bangla TV =

Shine TV Bangla is a Bengal-based cable television channel, that mainly focuses on projecting the culture of the land through its music and movies which are typical of the Bengal culture. The TV broadcaster is headquartered in Berhampore City, Murshidabad, West Bengal.

Shine TV Bangla channel mainly presents daily local news and also the Bollywood news. The channel presents the culture of Bengal through its music and movies, which is unique and characteristic of the region.

The channel is also very important for local advertising.

Channel Name	Shine TV Bangla
Head Office	Berhampore Murshidabad
Presenting Programs	Music, Movies, News
Type Of Telecast	Cable Line
Slogan	Sobar sathe, Sobar pashe.
