= Chaltia =

- Census Town
- Location in West Bengal, India Chaltia (India)
- Coordinates: 24.069035°N 88.262845°E
- State: West Bengal
- District: Murshidabad

Area
  - Total: 5.1303 km^{2} (1.9808 sq mi)

Population (2011)
  - Total: 25,336
  - Density: 4,938.5/km^{2} (12,791/sq mi)

Languages
  - Official: Bengali, English
- Time zone: UTC+5:30 (IST)
- PIN: 742102
- Telephone/STD code: 03482
- Vehicle registration: WB-57, WB-58
- Lok Sabha constituency: Baharampur
- Vidhan Sabha constituency: Baharampur
- Website: murshidbad.nic.in

Chaltia is a census town in the Berhampore CD block in the Berhampore subdivision of the Murshidabad district in the state of West Bengal, India.

== Geography ==
Cities, towns and locations in the Berhampore and Kandi subdivisions, Murshidabad district
M: municipal town, CT: census town, R: rural/ urban centre, H: historical centres
Owing to space constraints in the small map, the actual locations in a larger map may vary slightly

=== Location ===
Chaltia is located at 24.069035°N 88.262845°E.

== Demographics ==
According to the 2011 Census of India, Chaltia had a total population of 25,336, of which 12,803 (51%) were males and 12,533 (49%) were females. Population in the age range 0–6 years was 2,159. The total number of literate persons in Chaltia was 19,865 (85.71% of the population 6 years).

== Infrastructure ==
According to the District Census Handbook, Murshidabad, 2011, Chaltia covered an area of 5.1303 km^{2}. It had 10 km roads with both open and closed drains. The protected water-supply involved overhead tank, tube well/ bore well. It had 2,474 domestic electric connections. Among the medical facilities it had 3 medicine shops. Among the educational facilities, it had 1 primary school, 1 secondary school, senior secondary school, general degree college at Berhampore 1 km away. It had the branch office of 1 cooperative bank.

== Healthcare ==
Berhampore CD block is one of the areas of Murshidabad district where ground water is affected by high level of arsenic contamination. The WHO guideline for arsenic in drinking water is 10 mg/ litre, and the Indian Standard value is 50 mg/ litre. The maximum concentration in Berhampore CD block is 635 mg/litre.
