= Lalbagh =

Lalbagh, also spelled Lal Bagh is a term in Hindustani and Persian language. Its meanings include "red garden" and "beloved garden".

Lalbagh or Lal Bagh may refer to:

- Lalbagh, Mangalore, a city in India
- Lal Bagh, an old botanical garden in Bangalore, India
- Lalbagh metro station, a station serving the Basavanagudi area of Bangalore
- Lalbagh Fort, a 17th-century Mughal fort complex in Dhaka, Bangladesh
- Lalbagh Thana, a neighborhood in Dhaka
- Lalbagh Palace, a residence of the Holkar Maharajah in Indore, Madhya Pradesh, India

== See also ==
- Lal Bagh Express, a train in India
- Lalbag subdivision
- Lalbag Court Road railway station, a station in West Bengal, India
- Lal, an Indo-Iranian surname and given name
- Bāgh (garden), an enclosed garden with trees as well as flowers
