= Murshidabad College of Engineering & Technology =

- Type: Government aided, Private
- Established: 1998; 28 years ago
- Affiliations: Maulana Abul Kalam Azad University of Technology
- Principal: Aniruddha Das (I/C)
- Location: ITI More, Banjetia, Berhampore, Murshidabad, West Bengal, 742102, India; 24.1015048°N 88.2845885°E
- Campus: Semi-urban
- Approvals: AICTE
- Website: http://mcetbhb.net
- Location within West Bengal Location within India

Murshidabad College of Engineering & Technology (MCET), is a Engineering college located in Berhampore, West Bengal, India. It offers Bachelor of Technology (B.Tech.) at the undergraduate level operated under Maulana Abul Kalam Azad University of Technology, affiliated to All India Council for Technical Education (AICTE).

The college was established in 1998 with the approval of AICTE and affiliated to Kalyani University with 120 students in 3 disciplines. After six months, it was shifted to its own campus where the Laboratories, Workshops, Classrooms, Library, Computer Centers and Hostels are all currently located.

== History ==
The college was established with the help of Mr. Nripen Chowdhury, the then Sabhadhipati, Murshidabad Zill Parisad. On 8 August 1998 the formal inauguration was made by Dr. Asim Dasgupta, Ex- Minister-in-Charge, Finance, Government of West Bengal. The college was shifted to its present location and was formally started on 4 August 2001, by Mr. Buddhadeb Bhattacharjee, the then Hon'ble Chief Minister of West Bengal, This college getting financial help from TEQUIP.

== Courses offered ==
Undergraduate Programmes
Programme	Specialization
B.Tech.	Civil Engineering
B.Tech.	Computer Science and Engineering
B.Tech.	Information Technology (Stopped after 2017)
B.Tech.	Electronics and Communication Engineering
B.Tech.	Electrical Engineering
B.C.A.	Bachelor of Computer Applications
B.B.A.	Bachelor of Business Administration

== Campus ==
The campus is located at Banjetia, around 4 km away from Berhampore, the district town of Murshidabad district, West Bengal, India.

== Library ==
The institute possesses a library with textbooks, reference books, handbooks, Magazines, Journals, periodicals, etc. which has 11,000 books exclusively for B.Tech. students. There is a facility of "Book-bank" for SC/ST students sponsored by the Government of West Bengal.

== See also ==
- List of institutions of higher education in West Bengal
- Education in India
- Education in West Bengal
