= Berhampore =

City in West Bengal, India

Berhampore Baharampur
- Metropolis
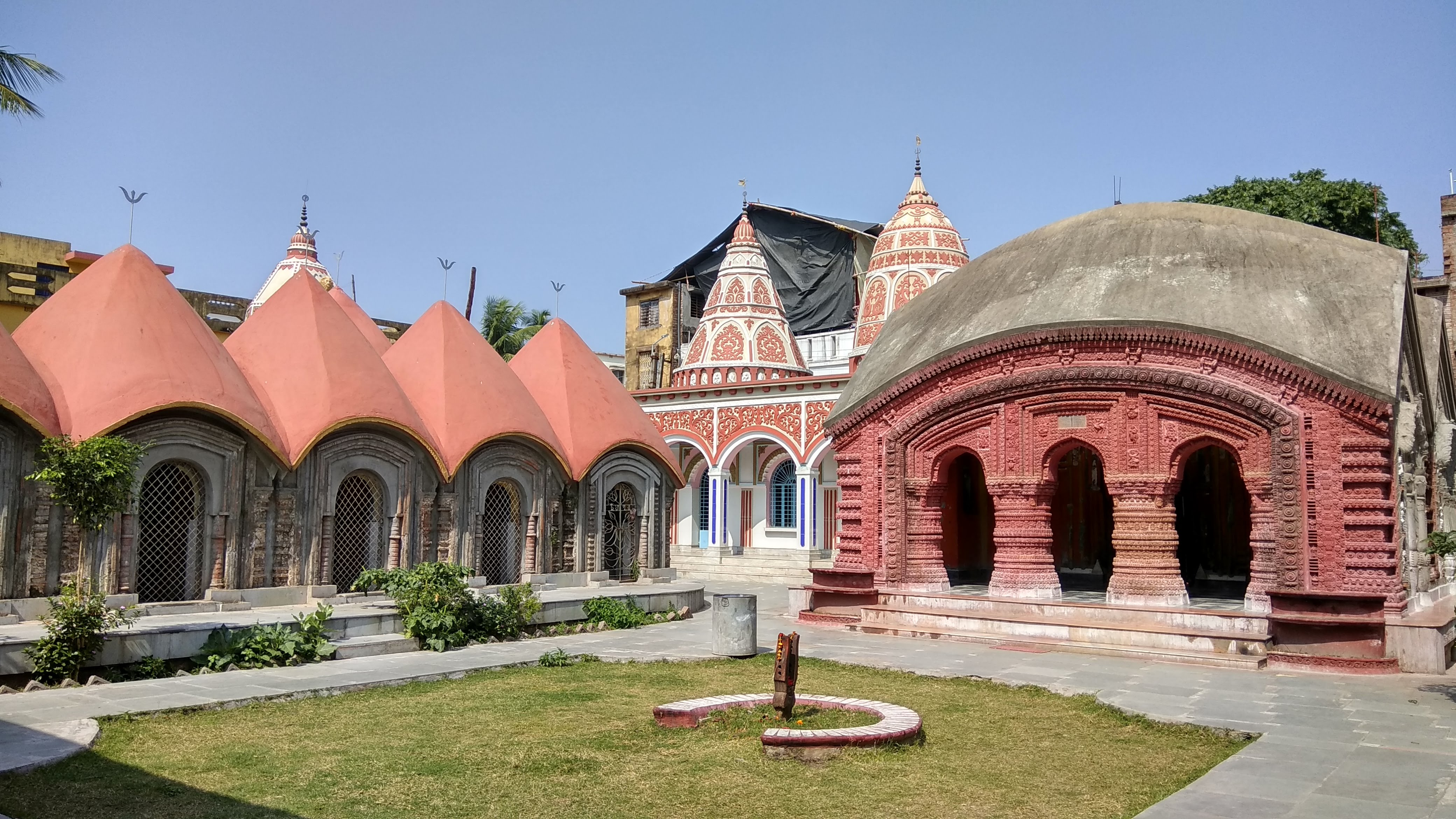
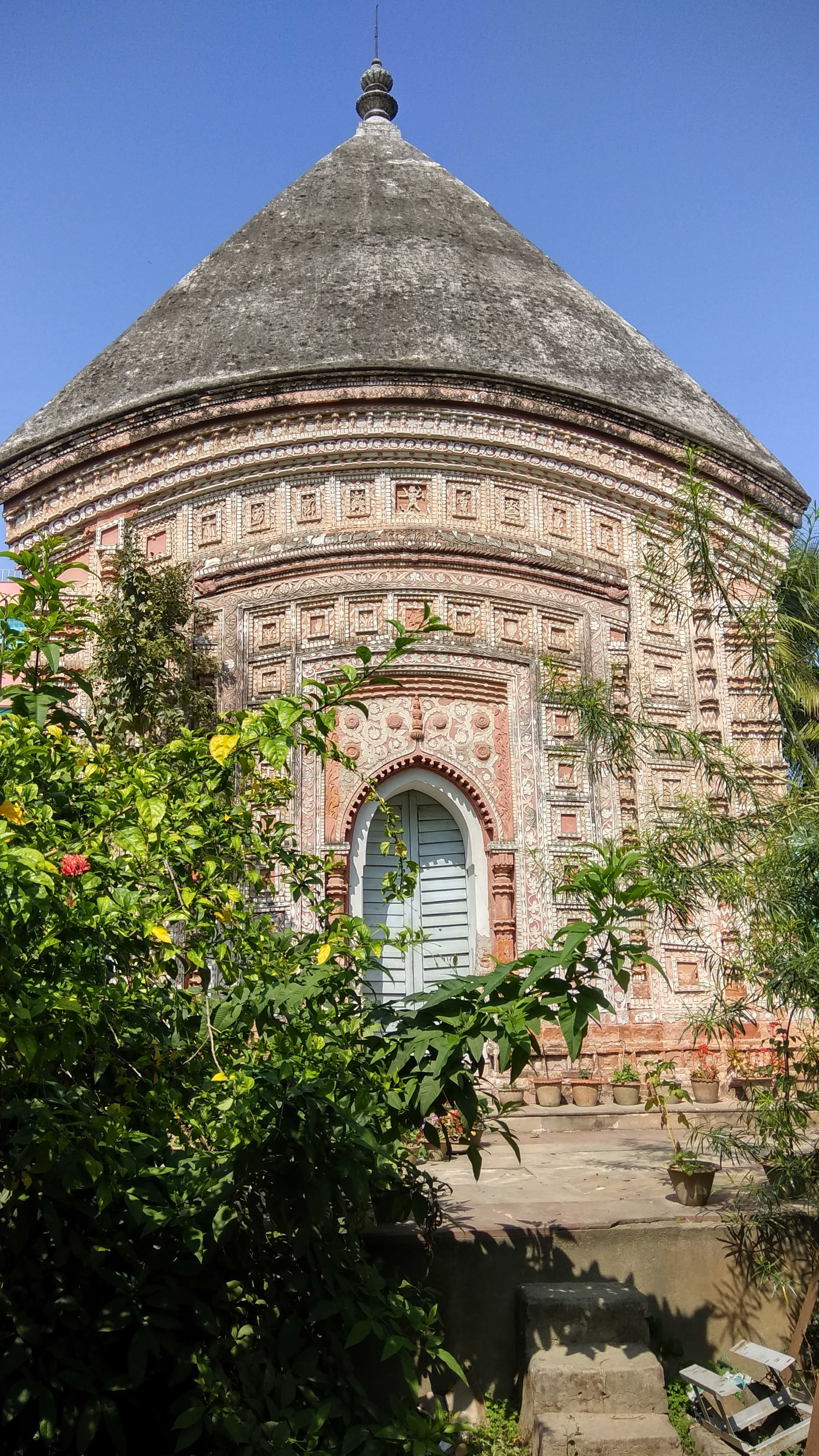
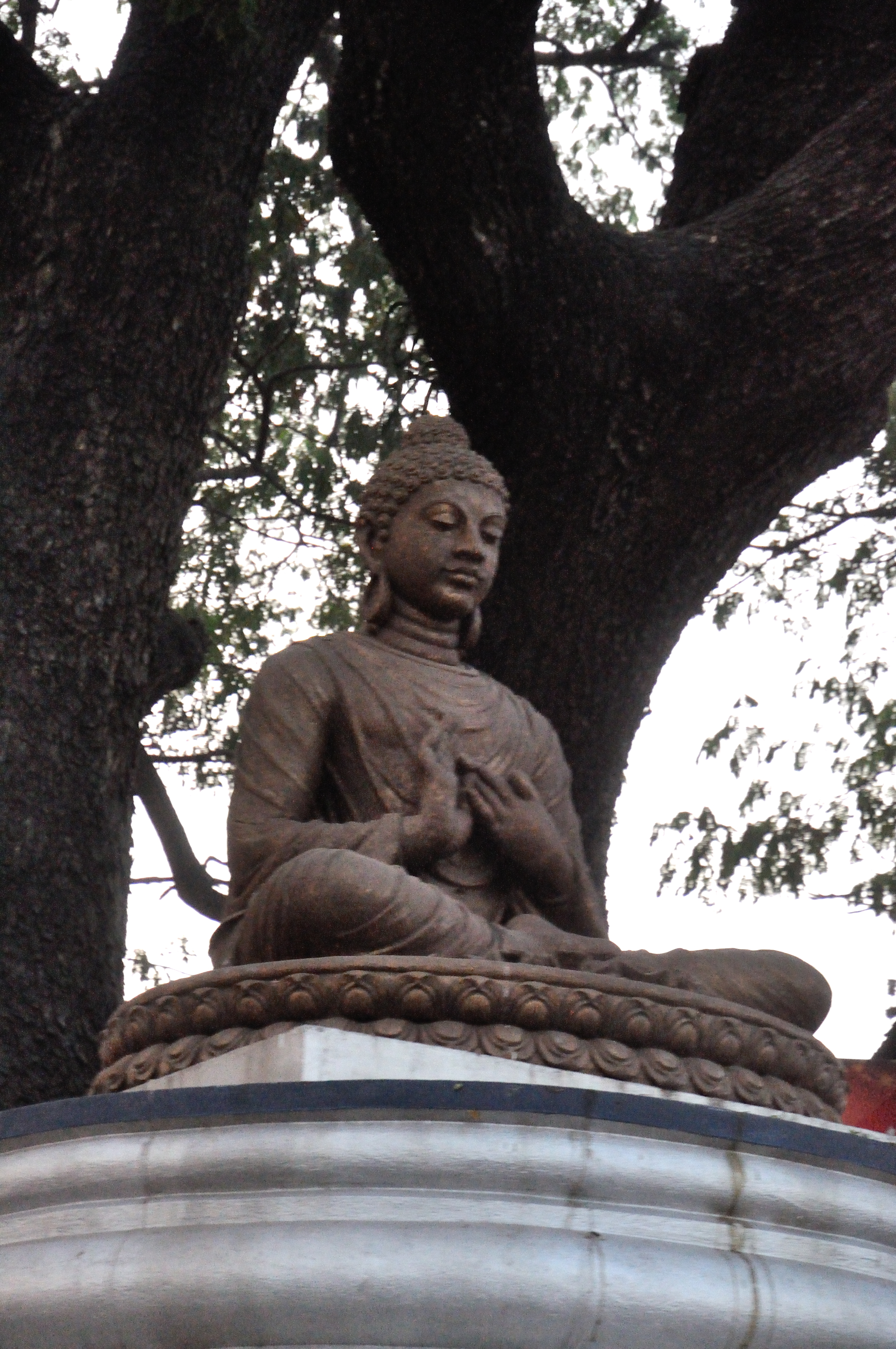
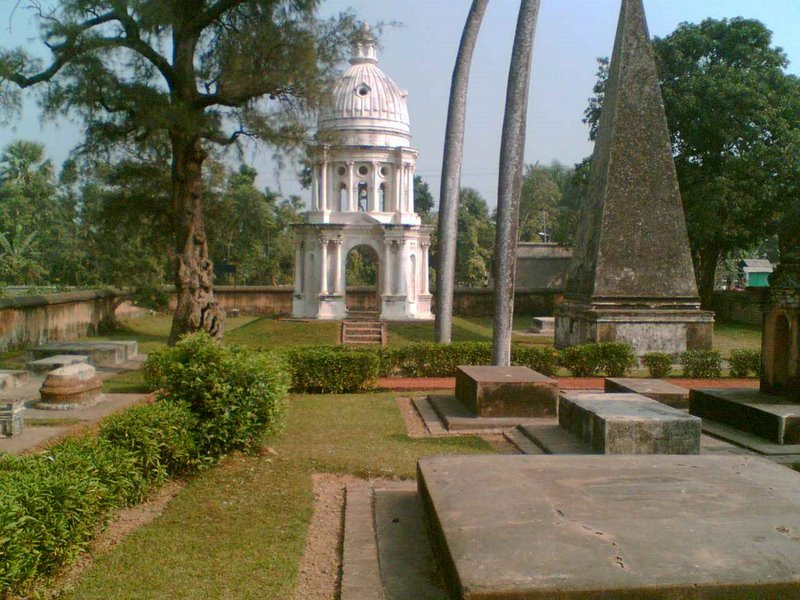
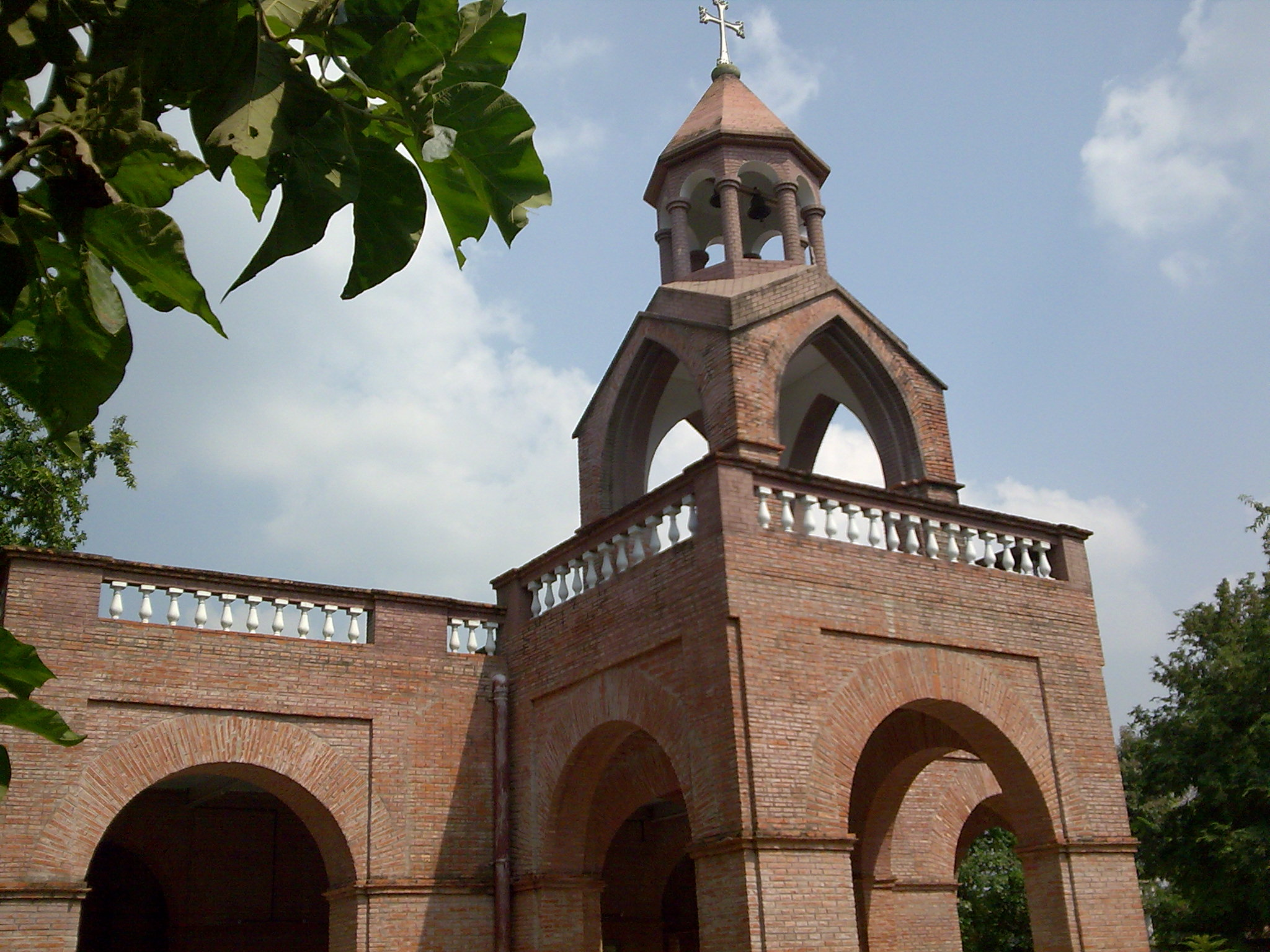
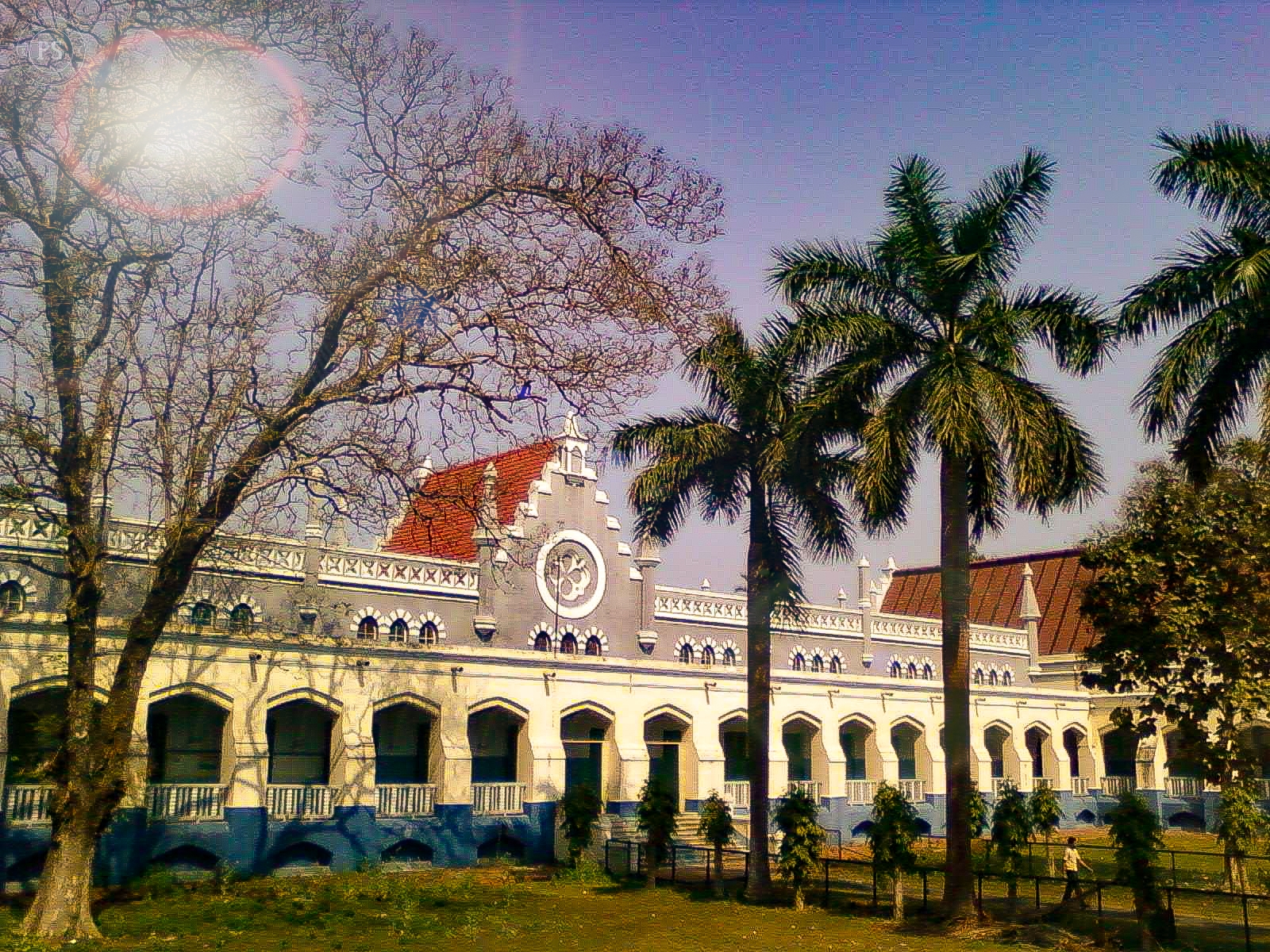
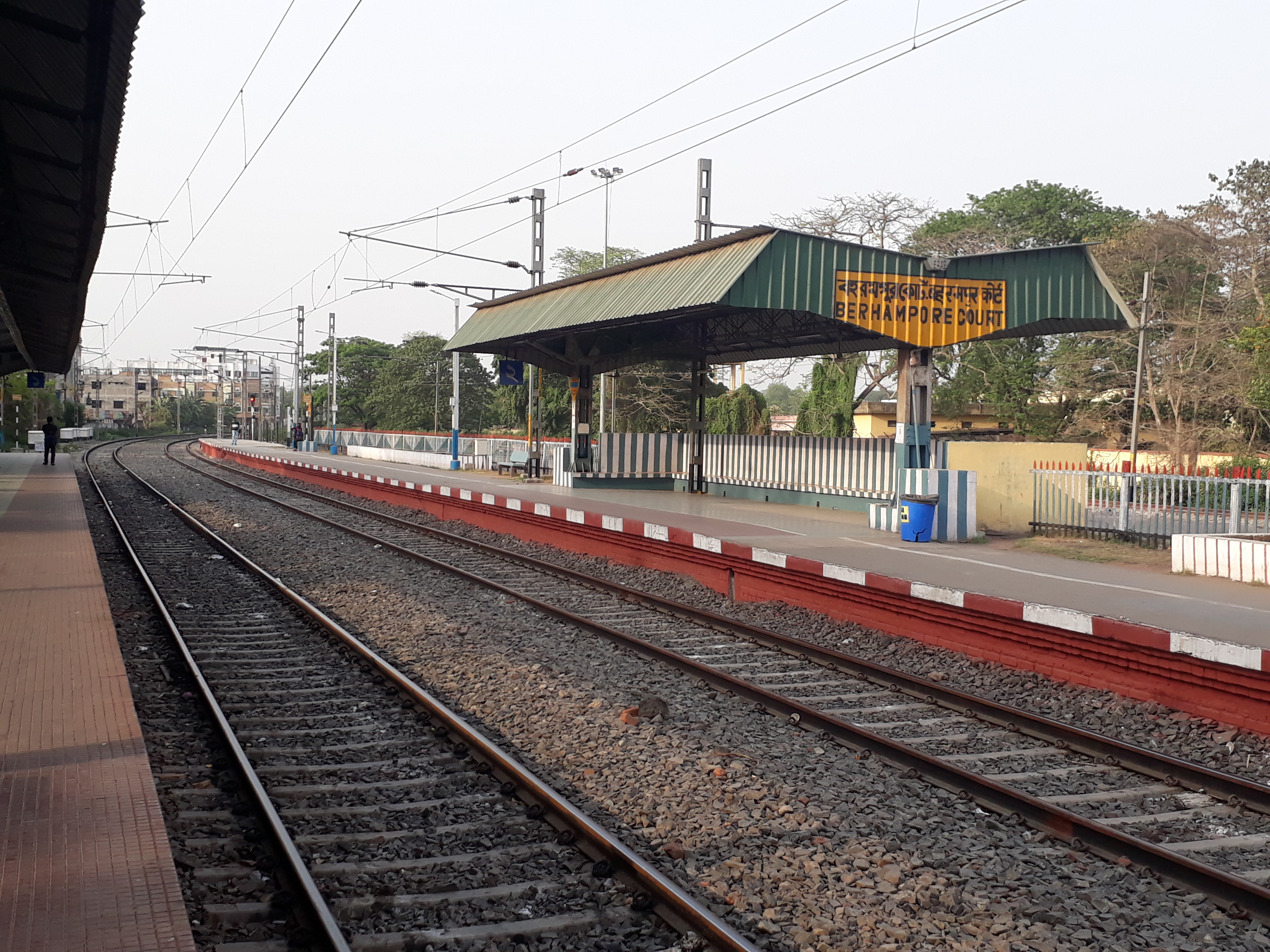
- From top, left to right : Maa Dayamoyee Kalibari, Shiva Temple in Saidabad, Seated Budhha, Dutch Graveyard, Armenian Church at Saidabad, Murshidabad Maharaja Krishnanath University, Berhampore Court railway station

- Location in West Bengal, India Berhampore (India)
- Coordinates: 24.1°N 88.25°E
- Country: India
- State: West Bengal
- District: Murshidabad

Government
  - Type: Municipality
  - Body: Berhampore Municipality
  - Chairman: Naru Gopal Mukherjee (TMC)
  - Vice Chairman: Swarup Saha (TMC)
  - MP: Yusuf Pathan (TMC)
  - MLA: Subrata Maitra (BJP)

Area
  - Metropolis: 104.25 km^{2} (40.25 sq mi)
  - Urban: 194.65 km^{2} (75.15 sq mi)
  - Metro: 194.67 km^{2} (75.16 sq mi)
  - Rank: 7th
- Elevation: 18 m (59 ft)

Population (2011)
  - Metropolis: 305,609
  - Density: 2,931.5/km^{2} (7,592.6/sq mi)

Languages
  - Official: Bengali, English
- Time zone: UTC+5:30 (IST)
- PIN: 742101, 742102, 742103
- Telephone code: 91-3482-2xxxxx
- Vehicle registration: WB57, WB58
- Lok Sabha: Baharampur
- Vidhan Sabha: Baharampur Nabagram Beldanga
- Website: berhamporemunicipality.org.in

Berhampore (/ˈbɛərəmpɔːr/), also known as Baharampur ([ˈbɔɦoˌrɔmpur]), is a city and a municipality in the state of West Bengal, India. Berhampore is the administrative headquarters of the Murshidabad district. As of the 2011 census, Berhampore is the seventh largest city in West Bengal. It is located about 186 km (116 mi) from Kolkata, the state capital.

Berhampore is one of the most important business, administrative, educational and political hubs of Bengal as well as of India. It is one of the most popular urban agglomerations of West Bengal state. Berhampore was the first centre of the East India Company in India. Not only the British but also the Dutch and the French established their companies in this city, and, as a result, it grew as a production hub of India. It is famous for sweets such as chhanabora, monohara, and rosogolla. The city is divided into five administrative regions: Gora Bazar, Khagra, Indraprastha, Cossimbazar, Haridasmati. Berhampore was a part of the Sepoy Mutiny of 1857 which took place at Berhampore Cantonment region (Barrack Square). The city was used by many foreign traders as their production hub. Before becoming a city many janpadas such as Saidabad, Farasdanga, Kalikapur had become famous. Cossimbazar had also become world famous for its muslin clothes. This city used to be the headquarters of Rajshahi administrative region till 1875.

== History ==
Berhampore was fortified in 1757 by the East India Company, after the Battle of Plassey in June 1757, and it continued as a cantonment until 1870. But the foundation of the city of Berhampore remains questionable.

Karnasubarna, which is the origin city of Berhampore, has a history dating back to 600 AD. Many buildings from the late 1600s can still be seen. It used to be known as Brahmapur because many of the Brahmin families settled here. The cantonment was constituted as a municipality in 1876 and was the headquarters of Murshidabad district. The Berhampore College was founded in 1853 and in 1888 made over to a local committee, mainly supported by Rani Swarnamayi. On 27 February 1857, the first major armed battle of the Indian Rebellion of 1857 took place in Barrack Square, Berhampore. Berhampore was ruled by Raja Krishnath, his ancestors and successors (he was succeeded by his sister's side of the family as he did not have any direct descendants). In 1901, Berhampore had a population of 24,397, and included the ancient town of Kasim Bazar.

== Geography ==
Cities, towns and locations in the Berhampore and Kandi subdivisions, Murshidabad district
M: municipal town, CT: census town, R: rural/ urban centre, H: historical centres
Owing to space constraints in the small map, the actual locations in a larger map may vary slightly

=== Location ===
Berhampore is located at 24.1°N 88.25°E. It has an average elevation of 18 metres (59 feet).

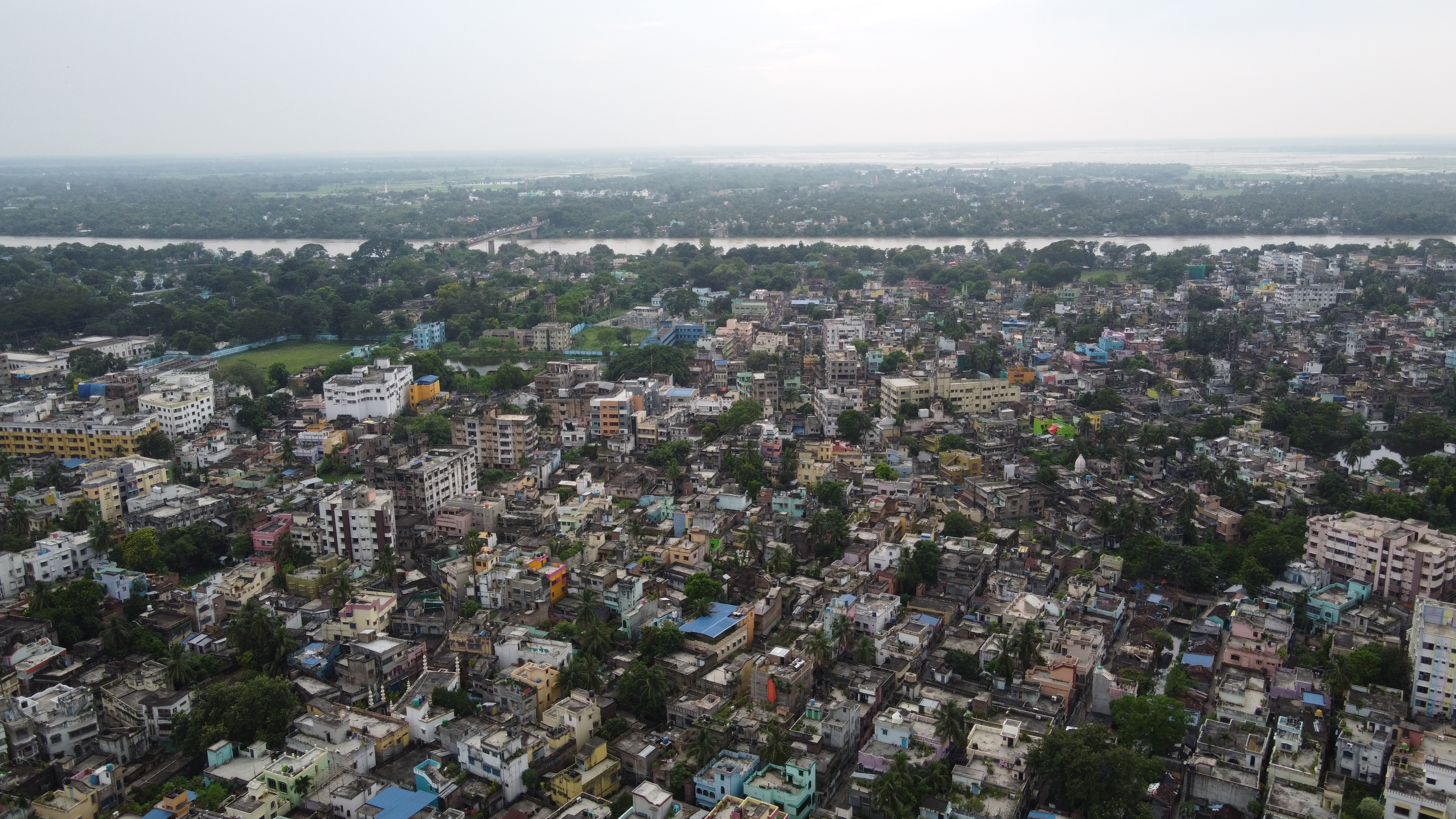
Aerial view of Berhampore and the Ganges

The city is located approximately 200 km north of Kolkata by road at 24°4′N 88°9′E and is situated on the eastern side of the Bhagirathi River, a major distributary of the Ganges which is known as the Hooghly River in its lower reaches.

Note: The map alongside presents some of the notable locations in the subdivisions. All places marked in the map are linked in the larger full screen map.

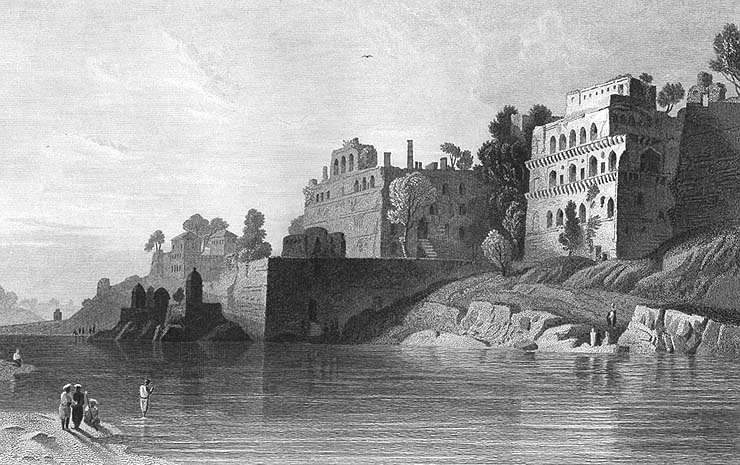
Fort at Berhampore, c. 1850

=== Localities ===
- Ajodhya Nagar
- Banjetia
- Bhatpara
- Chaltia
- Chunakhali
- Cossimbazar
- Goaljan
- Gora Bazar
- Haridasmati
- Indraprastha
- Kalabagan
- Khagra
- Panchanantala
- Raninagar
- Saidabad
- Uttarpara
- Balarampur, Berhampore
- Barishal Colony
- Bhakuri
- Bishnupur, Berhampore
- Farashdanga
- Gajadharpara
- Hatinagar
- Jamidari
- Khagraghat
- Kharasdanga
- Laldighi, Berhampore
- Madhupur, Berhampore
- Manindra Nagar
- Nimtala
- Radharghat
- Rajdharpara
- Ranibagan
- Sharma Para

== Civic administration ==
=== Municipality ===
Berhampore Municipality is eighth oldest municipality of West Bengal after that of Kolkata, Uttarpara, Shantipur, Howrah, Krishnanagar, Burdwan, and Basirhat.

Panchayats

The outskirts are governed by several Gram Panchayats. They are Bhakuri (I and II), Manindranagar, Hatinagar, Haridasmati, Niyallishpara Goaljan, Radharghat (I and II). These Gram Panchayats come well under Berhampore (community development block).

=== Police station ===
Berhampore police station has jurisdiction over Berhampore municipal area and a part of Berhampore CD Block.

== Climate ==
Berhampore has a monsoon-influenced humid subtropical climate (Köppen Cwa), distinguishing it from the tropical environment of southern West Bengal. The city has the hottest temperature ever to occur in West Bengal, with a record-setting 48.3 °C recorded on 23 May 1981.

Climate data for Behrampore (1991–2020, extremes 1901–present)
Month	Jan	Feb	Mar	Apr	May	Jun	Jul	Aug	Sep	Oct	Nov	Dec	Year
Record high °C (°F)	34.9 (94.8)	37.2 (99.0)	44.5 (112.1)	46.4 (115.5)	48.3 (118.9)	46.9 (116.4)	40.4 (104.7)	42.4 (108.3)	40.3 (104.5)	39.5 (103.1)	37.8 (100.0)	34.0 (93.2)	48.3 (118.9)
Mean maximum °C (°F)	28.3 (82.9)	33.0 (91.4)	37.7 (99.9)	39.9 (103.8)	41.0 (105.8)	39.1 (102.4)	36.3 (97.3)	36.0 (96.8)	36.3 (97.3)	35.6 (96.1)	33.5 (92.3)	30.2 (86.4)	41.6 (106.9)
Mean daily maximum °C (°F)	24.7 (76.5)	28.5 (83.3)	33.5 (92.3)	36.5 (97.7)	36.4 (97.5)	34.8 (94.6)	33.2 (91.8)	33.3 (91.9)	33.3 (91.9)	33.2 (91.8)	30.9 (87.6)	26.8 (80.2)	32.1 (89.8)
Mean daily minimum °C (°F)	11.8 (53.2)	15.4 (59.7)	19.7 (67.5)	23.8 (74.8)	25.2 (77.4)	26.1 (79.0)	26.3 (79.3)	26.4 (79.5)	25.9 (78.6)	24.0 (75.2)	19.0 (66.2)	14.1 (57.4)	21.5 (70.7)
Mean minimum °C (°F)	8.6 (47.5)	11.1 (52.0)	15.0 (59.0)	19.2 (66.6)	21.3 (70.3)	23.2 (73.8)	24.4 (75.9)	24.4 (75.9)	23.5 (74.3)	20.1 (68.2)	14.6 (58.3)	10.5 (50.9)	8.5 (47.3)
Record low °C (°F)	3.9 (39.0)	5.0 (41.0)	8.9 (48.0)	15.0 (59.0)	15.3 (59.5)	16.6 (61.9)	21.0 (69.8)	19.6 (67.3)	21.1 (70.0)	15.6 (60.1)	8.3 (46.9)	5.7 (42.3)	3.9 (39.0)
Average rainfall mm (inches)	8.9 (0.35)	13.6 (0.54)	17.7 (0.70)	51.0 (2.01)	123.3 (4.85)	201.0 (7.91)	278.7 (10.97)	258.9 (10.19)	274.1 (10.79)	128.0 (5.04)	7.7 (0.30)	7.0 (0.28)	1,369.8 (53.93)
Average rainy days	0.8	1.4	1.9	3.0	6.6	12	13.5	13.7	12.6	5.1	0.8	0.5	71.8
Average relative humidity (%) (at 17:30 IST)	64	59	53	59	68	77	84	84	84	80	72	69	71
Source: India Meteorological Department

== Demographics ==
In the 2011 census, Berhampore Urban Agglomeration had a population of 305,609, out of which 156,489 were males and 149,120 were females. The 0–6 years population was 23,182. Effective literacy rate for the 7+ population was 88.38. Bengali is the predominant language, spoken by 98.02% of the population. Hindi is spoken by 1.46%.

Religion in Berhampore (2011)
Hindus	90.14%
Muslims	9.07%
Other or not stated	0.79%

As of 2001 Indian census, Berhampore had a population of 160,168. Males constitute 51% of the population and females 49%. Berhampore has an average literacy rate of 79%, higher than the national average of 59.5%, with 53% of the males and 47% of females literate. 9% of the population is under 6 years of age.

== Economy ==
Initially, most of the residents of this city were employees and there were few agricultural as well as silk traders. Gradually, the importance of the city increased due to its geographic location. Due to its historical importance, this city also earns a good number of tourists, thus making tourism another prominent industry there.

Major industries include agricultural related industries like rice and oil-seed milling. Home-crafts like silk weaving, ivory carving, and precious metal working are other important industries in this city. Khagra, a neighbourhood in Bahrampur is renowned for its manufacture of bell-metal and brass utensils, as well as ivory, and wood carving. A famous type of metal used to make bells called "Khagrai Kansha" is made in the city. This is a type of brass that is used to make utensils like dishes & bowls.

Berhampore is famous for the sweet chhanabora, the savoury khaja, and the sweet manohara. It is also known for Murshidabad silk (tassar).

== Transport ==
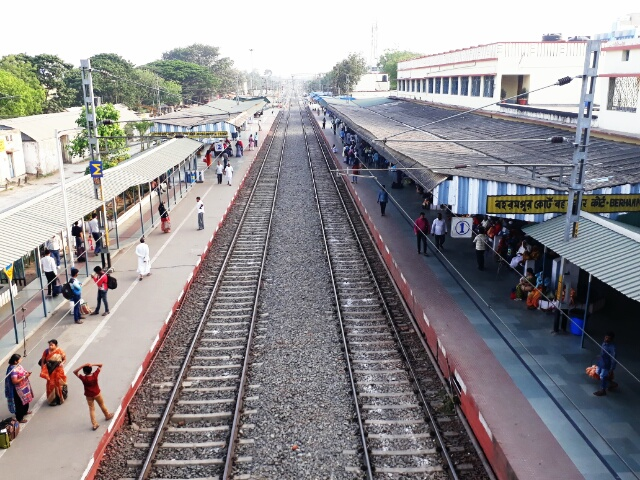
Baharmpur Railway Station, Murshidabad

Rail – Berhampore is 186 km from Kolkata by train. The train station is named as Berhampore Court (BPC), and it stands on the Sealdah–Lalgola line of the Eastern Railway. Main trains are the Bhagirathi Express (13103/13104), Hazarduari Express (13113/13114), and Dhano Dhanye Express (13117/13118). Other passenger trains include Sealdah–Lalgola passenger, Sealdah–Berhampore Court MEMU passenger, Ranaghat Jn–Lalgola EMU Locals, Krishnanagar City Jn–Lalgola EMU Locals. In the northern part of the town there is another railway station named Cossimbazar, which is the next railway station on the Sealdah–Lalgola route. At the southern part of the town lies a small halt station New Balarampur Halt Railway Station on Sealdah-Lalgola route and helps the southern outskirts' population.

Khagraghat Road (KGLE) station stands on the Howrah–Azimganj Junction line of the Eastern Railway. Main trains of this line are Sealdah–New Alipurduar Teesta–Torsa Express, Howrah–Dibrugarh Kamrup Express, Kolkata–Radhikapur Express, Hatey Bazare Express, Howrah–Malda Town Intercity Express, Puri–Kamakhya express via Howrah, Digha–New Jalpaiguri Paharia express, and Nabadwip Dham–Malda Town Express. A few kilometres ahead lies the Niyalish Para railway station, which is 4 km away from Berhampore city centre and 3 km away from Khagraghat Railway Station.

Road – As Berhampore is the administrative headquarters of the Murshidabad district and stands just in a central position of West Bengal, it acts as the link between North Bengal and South Bengal. This town is well connected by NH 12 (previously NH 34). The local transportation is heavily dependent on rickshaws and E-rickshaws (known as tuk-tuk or toto car). There are bus services on a regular basis from South Bengal to North Bengal and vice versa. Rapido services are now available all over Berhampore and in adjacent cities like Lalbagh (Murshidabad) and Jiaganj-Azimganj

There are three bus terminals in the city – two for the government bus services and the other bus terminus for private buses is called 'Mohona'. The bus terminus for NBSTC is called Mir Madan Bus terminus while the SBSTC bus terminus is named Barnoporichoy. There are regular bus services to Kolkata (Esplanade). Bus services are also available to other parts of West Bengal such as Durgapur, Sainthia, Siuri, Asansol, Burdwan, Bankura, Jhargram, Bolpur, Rampurhat, Nalhati, Kirnahar, Malda, Siliguri, Balurghat, Gangarampur, Krishnanagar, Ranaghat. Bus service is also available to Dumka (Jharkhand).

Water – Berhampore city is situated on the banks of Bhagirathi. Berhampore north to Berhampore south is connected via launchboats. Regular boat transport is also available from Berhampore to other towns of Murshidabad such as Azimganj-Jiaganj.

== Tourist spots ==
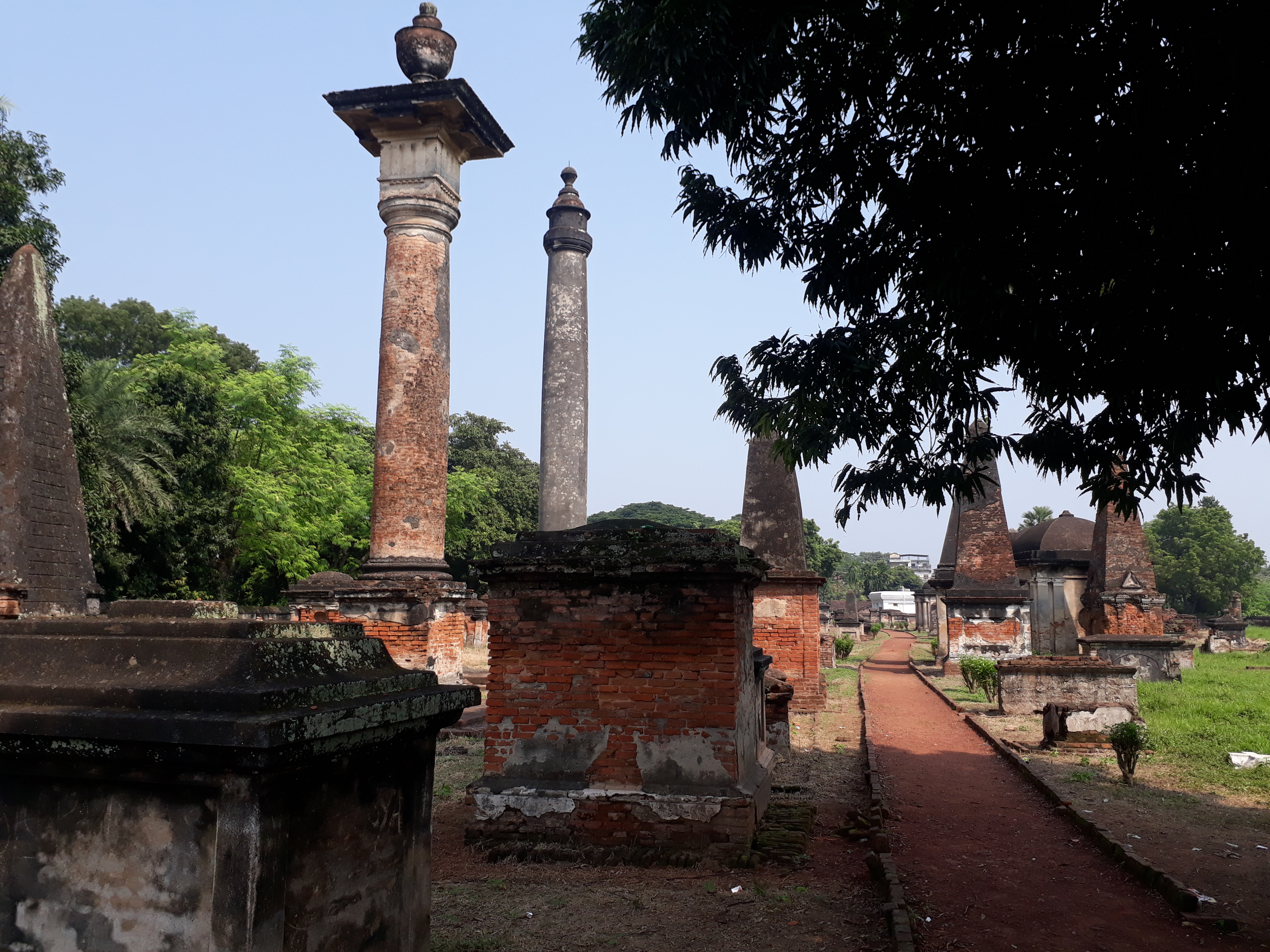
Residency Cemetery, Babulbona in Berhampore

Berhampore is a famous place for tourists in West Bengal. It gets tourists' flow from locals as well as from foreigners, being the first headquarters of the East India Company and having a long history enriched by the Nawabs of Bengal, Sultans of Bengal, Zamindar and other European colonial forces such as Dutch, Portuguese, English (British Raj) and French.

== Arts and culture ==
Having patronage from the Nawabs, artists from various field of arts sowed the seed of cultural heritage in this place. Elegant pieces of hand-craft arts can also be found in this region, namely the handcraft in making of carpet, bamboo and jute crafts, and miniature paintings.

This city can be considered one of the cultural hubs of West Bengal. 'Rabindra Sadan' is the place where most of the indoor cultural activities take place. Theatre groups like Berhampore Repertory Theater, Rangasram, Chhandik, Jugagni, Berhampore Gangchil and Prantik are based out of this town. These groups organise theatre festivals throughout the year mostly during the winter season. These festivals allow people from the city, nearby towns and villages to witness performances from different theatre groups from all over the state, different states and even groups from across the border of Bangladesh.

== Education ==
=== University ===
- Murshidabad Maharaja Krishnanath University, formerly Krishnath College (named Berhampore College until 1902) was established at Berhampore in 1853. In addition to undergraduate courses it offers post-graduate courses in physiology, sericulture and Sanskrit.

=== Colleges ===
- Berhampore College was initially founded in 1963 as Raja Krishnath College of Commerce, and was renamed in 1975. It is located in Berhampore.
- Berhampore Girls' College was established at Berhampore in 1946.
- Government College of Engineering & Textile Technology, Berhampore was established at Berhampore in 1927.
- Murshidabad College of Engineering & Technology was established at Berhampore in 1998.
- Murshidabad Medical College and Hospital was established at Berhampore in 2012.

=== Schools ===
- Krishnath College School
- Mary Immaculate School

== Legacy ==
The suburb of Berhampore in Wellington, New Zealand was named after this city. The daughter of Major Paul, an officer of the British Indian Army, was married to local land owner George Hunter, who subsequently named the suburb after this city, perhaps as a show of deference to his father-in-law. The old house of the "De" family (relatives of the Cossimbazar Raj) at Churamani Chowdhury Lane is also one of the oldest buildings in Berhampore and was at one point of time the property of the Cossimbazar Raj.

== Notable people ==
- Atin Bandyopadhyay, writer
- Sudip Bandyopadhyay, Politician and social worker
- R. D. Banerji, (AKA Rakhaldas Bandyopadhyay), Indian archaeologist
- Nabarun Bhattacharya, writer
- Arup Chandra, poet, writer
- Tridib Chaudhuri, politician
- Adhir Ranjan Chowdhury, politician
- Renu Pada Das, politician
- Manju Dey, actress
- Mahasweta Devi, writer
- Nirupama Devi, writer
- Dipyaman Ganguly, physician-scientist immunologist and cell biologist
- Manish Ghatak, poet of Kallol era
- Shreya Ghoshal, playback singer
- Braja Bhusan Gupta, Nationalist politician
- Moinul Hassan, writer
- Sir George Francis Hill, Director and Principal Librarian of the British Museum (1931–1936)
- Micaiah John Muller Hill, British mathematician
- Moniruddin Khan, writer
- Koushik Roy, actor
- Sudip Roy, artist
- Baikuntha Nath Sen, politician and social worker
- Surya Sen, revolutionary
- Satyarup Siddhanta, mountaineer
- Arijit Singh, singer
- Syed Mustafa Siraj, writer
- Ramendra Sundar Tribedi, writer

== Sources ==
- Encyclopedia.Com
- Encyclopædia Britannica
- The Columbia Encyclopedia
