= Berhampore (community development block) =

- Community development block
- Interactive map of Berhampore
- Coordinates: 24.10°N 88.25°E
- Country: India
- State: West Bengal
- District: Murshidabad

Government
  - Type: Federal democracy

Area
  - Total: 194.67 km^{2} (75.16 sq mi)
- Elevation: 22 m (72 ft)

Population (2011)
  - Total: 446,887
  - Density: 2,295.6/km^{2} (5,945.6/sq mi)

Languages
  - Official: Bengali, English

Literacy
  - Literacy (2011): 73.51%
- Time zone: UTC+5:30 (IST)
- PIN: 742101 (Baharampur); 742188 (Goaljan); 742102 (Kasim Bazar Raj)
- Telephone/STD code: 03482
- ISO 3166 code: IN-WB
- Vehicle registration: WB-57, WB-58
- Lok Sabha constituency: Baharampur
- Vidhan Sabha constituency: Baharampur, Nabgram, Kandi, Beldanga, Hariharpara
- Website: murshidabad.gov.in

Berhampore is a community development block that forms an administrative division in the Berhampore subdivision of Murshidabad district in the Indian state of West Bengal.

== Geography ==
Berhampore is located at 24°06′N 88°15′E

Berhampore CD block lies in the Ganges-Bhagirathi Basin, which is a long and narrow river valley. The Bhagirathi River splits the district into two natural physiographic regions – Rarh on the west and Bagri on the east. It has fertile soil suitable for cultivation.

Berhampore CD block is bounded by Murshidabad-Jiaganj CD block in the north, Hariharpara CD block in the east, Beldanga I CD block in the south and Nabagram CD block, in the west.

The Bagri or the eastern part of the district is a low lying alluvial plain with the shape of an isosceles triangle. The Ganges/Padma and the Bhagirathi form the two equal sides; the Jalangi forms the entire base; other offshoots of the Ganges meander within the area. It is vulnerable to flooding caused by the spill of the Bhagirathi and other rivers.

Berhampore CD block has an area of 314.19 km^{2}. It has 1 panchayat samity, 17 gram panchayats, 317 gram sansads (village councils), 144 mouzas and 124 inhabited villages. Baharampur and Daulatabad police stations serve this block. Headquarters of this CD block is at Baharampur.

Gram panchayats of Berhampore block/ panchayat samiti are: Bhakuri I, Bhakuri II, Chhaighari, Doulatabad, Gurudaspur, Haridasmati, Hatinagar, Madanpur, Manindra Nagar, Neallishpara Goaljan, Naoda, Nowdapanur, Radharghat I, Radharghat II, Rajdharpara, Rangamati Chandpara, Sahajadpur and Satui Chowrigachha.

== Demographics ==
=== Population ===
According to the 2011 Census of India, Berhampore CD block had a total population of 446,887, of which 337,623 were rural and 109,264 were urban. There were 228,650 (51%) males and 218,237 (49%) females. Population in the age range 0–6 years was 54,097. Scheduled Castes numbered 76,935 (17.22%) and Scheduled Tribes numbered 10,809 (2.42%).

As per 2001 census, Berhampore block has a total population of 378,830, out of which 94,861 were males and 86,466 were females. Berhampore block registered a population growth of 26.80 per cent during the 1991-2001 decade. Decadal growth for the district was 23.70 per cent. Decadal growth in West Bengal was 17.84 per cent.

The decadal growth of population in Berhampore CD block in 2001-2011 was 17.95%.

Decadal Population Growth Rate (%)

- Berhampore CD Block
- Murshidabad district
- West Bengal

=== Census towns and villages ===
Census towns in Berhampore CD block were (2011 population figures in brackets): Goaljan (4,850), Kasim Bazar (11,724), Banjetia (10,400), Sibdanga Badarpur (12,829), Gopjan (23,415), Gora Bazar (5,200), Ajodhya Nagar (8,883), Chaltia (25,336) and Haridasmati (6,627).

Large villages in Berhampore CD block were (2011 population in brackets): Moktarpur (5,881), Andar Manik (7,938), Shahjadpur (7,299), Nischintapur (5,148), Katalia (4,198), Chumarigacha (4,481), Bara Satui (5,136), Chhota Satui (4,745), Charmahula (4,575), Bezpara (4,612), Sundipara (5,627), Rajdharpara (5,687), Purbba Narayanpur (8,664), Kharasdanga (4,219), Naoda Panur (5,743), Tarakpur (7,584), Bairgachhi (8,148), Kalikapur Kadamkhandi (4,258), Putijol (4,011), Hatinagar (8,057), Janmahmmadpur (6,679), Usta (5,645), Kulbaria (5,659), Daulatabad (5,761), Chutipur (5,001), Selamatpur (8,032), Dadpur (6,300), Chhayaghari (12,388) and Kaladanga (8,182).

=== Literacy ===
As per the 2011 census, the total number of literate persons in Berhampore CD block was 288,728 (73.51% of the population over 6 years) out of which males numbered 153,930 (76.52% of the male population over 6 years) and females numbered 134,798 (70.34% of the female population over 6 years). The gender disparity (the difference between female and male literacy rates) was 6.18%.

See also – List of West Bengal districts ranked by literacy rate

Literacy in CD blocks of
Murshidabad district
Jangipur subdivision
Farakka – 59.75%
Samserganj – 54.98%
Suti I – 58.40%
Suti II – 55.23%
Raghunathganj I – 64.49%
Raghunathganj II – 61.17%
Sagardighi – 65.27%
Lalbag subdivision
Murshidabad-Jiaganj – 69.14%
Bhagawangola I - 57.22%
Bhagawangola II – 53.48%
Lalgola– 64.32%
Nabagram – 70.83%
Sadar subdivision
Berhampore – 73.51%
Beldanga I – 70.06%
Beldanga II – 67.86%
Hariharpara – 69.20%
Naoda – 66.09%
Kandi subdivision
Kandi – 65.13%
Khargram – 63.56%
Burwan – 68.96%
Bharatpur I – 62.93%
Bharatpur II – 66.07%
Domkol subdivision
Domkal – 55.89%
Raninagar I – 57.81%
Raninagar II – 54.81%
Jalangi – 58.73%
Source: 2011 Census: CD Block Wise
Primary Census Abstract Data

=== Language and religion ===
Religion in Berhampore CD block (2011)
Islam	53.63%
Hinduism	45.94%
Other or not stated	0.43%

In the 2011 census, Muslims numbered 239,651 and formed 53.63% of the population in Berhampore CD block. Hindus numbered 205,321 and formed 45.94% of the population. Others numbered 1,915 and formed 0.43% of the population. In Berhampore CD block while the proportion of Muslims increased from 52.45% in 1991 to 52.83% in 2001, the proportion of Hindus declined from 47.44% in 1991 to 46.84% in 2001.

Murshidabad district had 4,707,573 Muslims who formed 66.27% of the population, 2,359,061 Hindus who formed 33.21% of the population, and 37, 173 persons belonging to other religions who formed 0.52% of the population, in the 2011 census. While the proportion of Muslim population in the district increased from 61.40% in 1991 to 63.67% in 2001, the proportion of Hindu population declined from 38.39% in 1991 to 35.92% in 2001.

Murshidabad was the only Muslim majority district in West Bengal at the time of partition of India in 1947. The proportion of Muslims in the population of Murshidabad district in 1951 was 55.24%. The Radcliffe Line had placed Muslim majority Murshidabad in India and the Hindu majority Khulna in Pakistan, in order to maintain the integrity of the Ganges river system In India.

Bengali is the predominant language, spoken by 97.92% of the population.

== Rural poverty ==
As per the Human Development Report 2004 for West Bengal, the rural poverty ratio in Murshidabad district was 46.12%. Purulia, Bankura and Birbhum districts had higher rural poverty ratios. These estimates were based on Central Sample data of NSS 55th round 1999–2000.

== Economy ==
=== Livelihood ===
In Berhampore CD block in 2011, amongst the class of total workers, cultivators formed 17.01%, agricultural labourers 35.12%, household industry workers 4.23% and other workers 43.63%.

=== Infrastructure ===
There are 124 inhabited villages in Berhampore CD block. 100% villages have power supply and 123 villages (99.19%) have drinking water supply. 37 villages (29.84%) have post offices. 112 villages (90.32%) have telephones (including landlines, public call offices and mobile phones). 57 villages (45.97%) have a pucca approach road and 51 villages (41.13%) have transport communication (includes bus service, rail facility and navigable waterways). 17 villages (13.71%) have agricultural credit societies and 14 villages (11.21%) have banks.

=== Agriculture ===
Persons engaged in agriculture
in Berhampore CD block
1. Bargadars (4.78%)
2. Patta holders (9.66%)
3. Small farmers (4.28%)
4. Marginal farmers (28.9%)
5. Agricultural labourers (52.4%)

From 1977 onwards major land reforms took place in West Bengal. Land in excess of land ceiling was acquired and distributed amongst the peasants. Following land reforms land ownership pattern has undergone transformation. In 2013–14, persons engaged in agriculture in Berhampore CD Block could be classified as follows: bargadars 4,950 (4.78%,) patta (document) holders 10,008 (9.66%), small farmers (possessing land between 1 and 2 hectares) 4,432 (4.28%), marginal farmers (possessing land up to 1 hectare) 29,946 (28.92%) and agricultural labourers 103,550 (52.36%).

Berhampore CD block had 119 fertiliser depots, 3 seed stores and 80 fair price shops in 2013–14.

In 2013–14, Berhampore CD block produced 34,732 tonnes of Aman paddy, the main winter crop from 11,654 hectares, 43,306 tonnes of Boro paddy (spring crop) from 11,293 hectares, 3,161 tonnes of Aus paddy (summer crop) from 1,093 hectares, 22,533 tonnes of wheat from 8,478 hectares, 227,638 tonnes of jute from 13,631 hectares, 4,405 tonnes of potatoes from 154 hectares and 79 tonnes of sugar cane from 1 hectare. It also produced pulses and oilseeds.

In 2013–14, the total area irrigated in Berhampore CD block was 10,249 hectares, out of which 1,120 hectares were irrigated with tank water, 1,417 hectares by river lift irrigation, 1,204 hectares by deep tube wells, 108 hectares by shallow tube well and 6,400 hectares by other means.

=== Silk and handicrafts ===
Murshidabad is famous for its silk industry since the Middle Ages. There are three distinct categories in this industry, namely (i) Mulberry cultivation and silkworm rearing (ii) Peeling of raw silk (iii) Weaving of silk fabrics.

Ivory carving is an important cottage industry from the era of the Nawabs. The main areas where this industry has flourished are Khagra and Jiaganj. 99% of ivory craft production is exported. In more recent years sandalwood etching has become more popular than ivory carving. Bell metal and Brass utensils are manufactured in large quantities at Khagra, Berhampore, Kandi and Jangipur. Beedi making has flourished in the Jangipur subdivision.

=== Banking ===
In 2013–14, Berhampore CD block had offices of 21 commercial banks and 4 gramin banks.

=== Backward Regions Grant Fund ===
Murshidabad district is listed as a backward region and receives financial support from the Backward Regions Grant Fund. The fund, created by the Government of India, is designed to redress regional imbalances in development. As of 2012, 272 districts across the country were listed under this scheme. The list includes 11 districts of West Bengal.

== Transport ==
Berhampore CD block has 10 ferry services and 22 originating/ terminating bus routes.

The Ranaghat-Lalgola branch line was opened in 1905. It passes through this CD block and there are stations at Cossimbazar and Berhampore Court railway station.

NH 12 (old number NH 34) passes through this block.

SH 11, running from Mahammad Bazar (in Birbhum district) to Ranaghat (in Nadia district) passes through this CD Block.

== Education ==
In 2013–14, Berhampore CD block had 192 primary schools with 19,964 students, 41 middle schools with 3,991 students, 9 high school with 8,108 students and 26 higher secondary schools with 41,349 students. Berhampore CD Block had 4 technical/ professional institutions with 1,610 students and 683 institutions for special and non-formal education with 30,926 students

In Berhampore CD block, amongst the 124 inhabited villages, 8 villages did not have a school, 67 villages had more than 1 primary school, 63 villages had at least 1 primary school, 53 villages had at least 1 primary and 1 middle school and 26 villages had at least 1 middle and 1 secondary school.

== Healthcare ==
In 2014, Berhampore CD block had 1 block primary health centre, 2 primary health centres and 9 private nursing homes with total 35 beds and 9 doctors (excluding private bodies). It had 57 family welfare subcentres. 6,207 patients were treated indoor and 145,229 patients were treated outdoor in the hospitals, health centres and subcentres of the CD Block.

Berhampore CD block has Karnasuvarna Block Primary Health Centre at PO Karnasuvarna (with 15 beds), Chourigacha Primary Health Centre at PO Satui (with 10 beds), and Hatinagar PHC (with 10 beds).

Berhampore CD block is one of the areas of Murshidabad district where ground water is affected by high level of arsenic contamination. The WHO guideline for arsenic in drinking water is 10 mg/ litre, and the Indian Standard value is 50 mg/ litre. All but one of the 26 blocks of Murshidabad district have arsenic contamination above the WHO level, all but two of the blocks have arsenic concentration above the Indian Standard value and 17 blocks have arsenic concentration above 300 mg/litre. The maximum concentration in Berhampore CD Block is 635 mg/litre.
