= Maya Rani Paul =

Indian politician (died 2019)

Personal details
- Born: 1932/33
- Died: 15 March 2019
- Party: All India Trinamool Congress
- Spouse: Sankar Das Paul

Maya Rani Paul was an Indian politician. She was elected thrice as Berhampore Vidhan Sabha Constituency in West Bengal Legislative Assembly. Her husband Sankar Das Paul was also elected thrice as Berhampore Vidhan Sabha Constituency in West Bengal Legislative Assembly. She died on 15 March 2019 at the age of 86.
