= Arup Chandra =

Bengali poet and writer (born 1951)

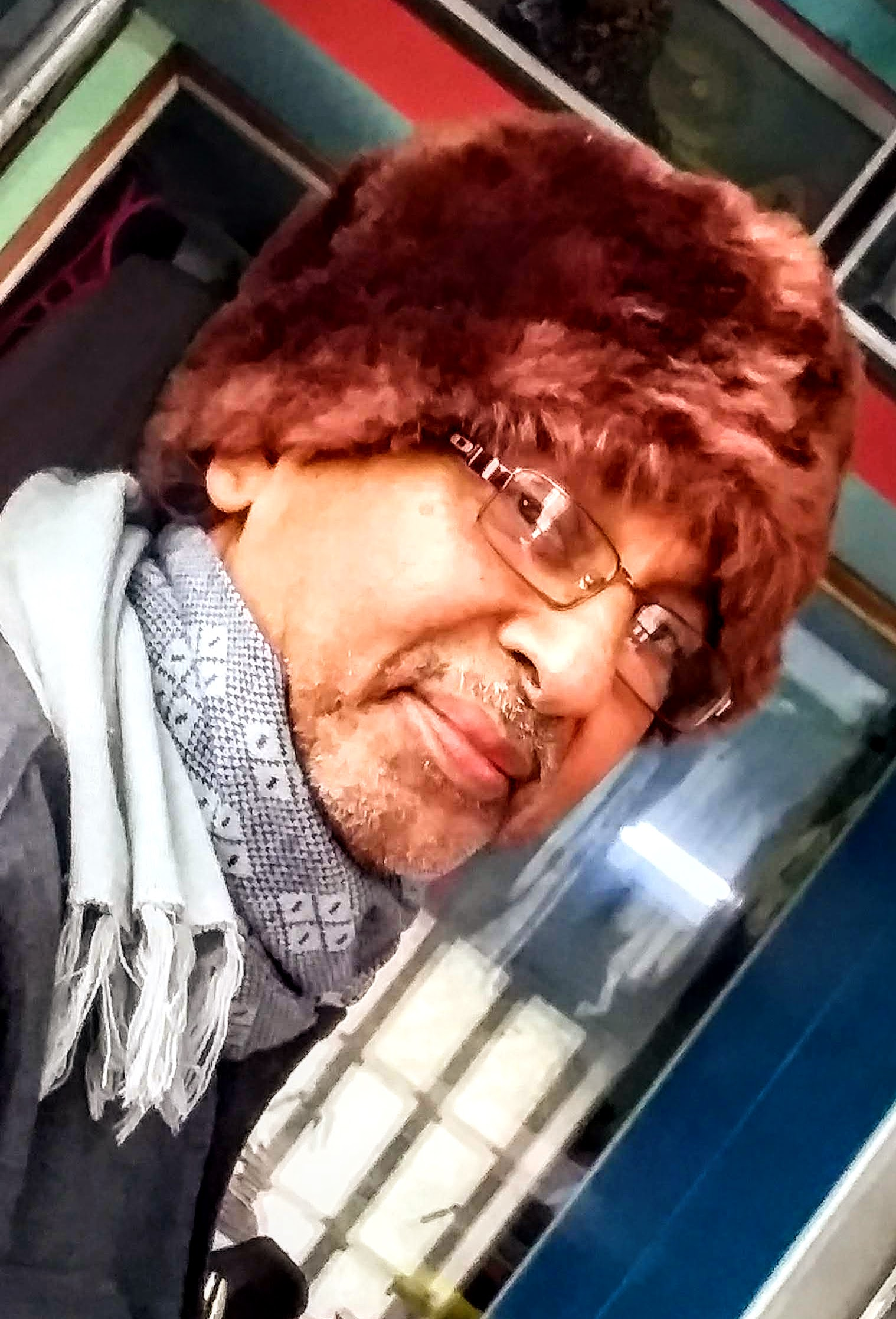
- Born: 5 March 1951 (age 75); Baharampur, Murshidabad, West Bengal, India
- Citizenship: Indian
- Known for: Contribution in the fields of Arts, Recitation, History research, Bengali Shorthand
- Website: www.ccaiindia.com, www.basabhumi.ccaiindia.com

Arup Chandra, born in 1951 in Murshidabad district in the state of West Bengal, is a writer, poet, essayist, art critic, and educator. He is the writer of more than fourteen books, and has edited twelve others. Two of his books are translated into English and published. His research speciality is the history, poetry, art, culture and literature of Murshidabad District.

== Profession and works ==
His most known works are related to education, arts, literature and history. He remarkably researched and developed 'Bengali Shorthand'; presently 'Arup Chandra Bengali Shorthand System' is the most popular 'Bengali Shorthand System' in Bengal.

== Publications ==
- Hirak Buke Sikal Baje – Bengali Poetry (1980)
- Jharer Britte - A Novel (1987)
- Shilper Byakaran - Book on Art (1990) Five editions are published already.
- Mao - Tse -Tung'er Kobita - Poetry, Translation of the Poems of Mao -Tse -Tung (1993)
- Amar Bharatbarsha - Poetry (1997)
- Sanket Lipi - (Bengali Shorthand) - Research (1998)
- Dhasto Prithibir Kabita – Poetry (2004)
- Kemon Achi Amra – Poetry (2007)
- Janmo Kanna – Poetry (2012)
- The Theory of Art (English) - Book on Art (2012) - Translated by Prof. Ashokendu Das
- Murshidabader Chitrakala Bhaskarya Sthapatya - History of Art in Murshidabad Region (2014)
- Murshidabad Jilanchaler Kalapanji - History, Chronological discourse of the history of this region (2014)
- Shilper Byakaran : Bharat O Biswashilpa - Book on Art, Sculpture & Architecture (2016) - ISBN 978-81-930474-6-0
- Banglar Shilpi : Debobrata Mukhopadhyay - Kamrul Hasan (2016)- Biography of the said artists. (Debobrata Mukhopadhyay & Kamrul Hasan)
- Bharate Shramik Andoloner Suchona ebong Murshidabad'e Shramik Karmochari Andolon (2017)
- Dhusar Jyotsnai Mundahin Kobi (2019) - Poetry
- Mao-Tse-Tung'er Kobita [2nd edition] - Poetry, Translation of the Poems of Mao-Tse-Tung (2018)

== Edited books ==
1. Sachin Biswas'er Galpo Samagro - Collection of Short Stories by Sachin Biswas (Edited by Arup Chandra) (2013)
2. Banglai Hazar Bacharer Krishak Bidroho O Murshidabad - Regional History (Edited by Arup Chandra) (2014)
3. Murshidabader Nirbachito Kabi O Kabita - Poetry (Edited by Arup Chandra) - ISBN 978-81-930474-3-9
4. Murshidabad Itibritta (1st Part) - Regional History (Edited by Arup Chandra) - ISBN 978-81-930474-2-2
5. Murshidabad Itibritta (2nd Part) - Regional History (Edited by Arup Chandra) - ISBN 978-81-930474-5-3
6. Murshidabad Itibritta (3rd Part) - Regional History (Edited by Arup Chandra)
7. Murshidabad Itibritta (4th Part) - Regional History (Edited by Arup Chandra)
8. Murshidabad Itibritta (5th Part) - Regional History (Edited by Arup Chandra)
9. Prabir Acharyer Nirbachito Kobita Sangraha - Prabir Acharya (Edited by Arup Chandra)
10. Kalketur Apon Deshe (An anthropological research) - Pulakendu Singha (Edited by Arup Chandra)
11. Pratnatattwa Puratattwa Nritattwa : First Part, 2016 (A collection of essays on archaeological anthropological and ethnographic studies) - Edited by Arup Chandra
12. Pratnatattwa Puratattwa Nritattwa : Second Part, 2019 (A collection of essays on archaeological anthropological and ethnographic studies) - Edited by Arup Chandra

== Basabhumi Patrika Issues ==
- Basabhumi 40 year issue-2019 (বাসভূমি ৪০ বর্ষ সংখ্যা-২০১৯)
- Basabhumi Special RIVER Issue-2018 (বাসভূমি বিশেষ নদী সংখ্যা-২০১৮)

== Awards ==
- The first notable award Mr. Arup Chandra received in the year of 1986 securing 'First' position in a district level poetry competition in the district of Nadia, West Bengal.
- Academy of Music and Fine Arts, Barrackpore, Kolkata honored him with an 'Upadhi' (an honorary title) - 'Shastri' on 6 September 1992 at Sukanta Sadan, Barrackpore.
- Received 'memento' in honor in the occasion of 'Berhampore Grant Hall Centenary Celebration'. (2003)
- Received 'memento' in honor, in the occasion of 130th anniversary celebration of Berhampore Municipality. (2007)
- Arup Chandra was 'Felicitated' by 'Murshidabad District Kobita Academy' on their 125th poetry-assembly on 7 March 2010.
- He was Awarded with 'Acharya Prafulla Chanda Roy Smarak Samman-2010' by 'Academy of Bengali Poetry, Kolkata', at National Library, Kolkata.
- He was Awarded with 'Kabiguru Rabindranath Tagore Smarak Samman-2011' by 'Academy of Bengali Poetry, Kolkata' on 16 April 2011, at Moulali Yuva Kendra.
- He was Awarded with 'Barnaparichay Sahitya Samman-2011' for his work on 'Basabhumi Patrika' - 'Khuda Daridro Anahar (Eei Desh Eei Samay) Sankha-2011'. The award ceremony was held on 17 December 2011 at Kolkata Town Hall.
- Received Award on behalf of 'Basabhumi Patrika' from 'Prabrajja' Patrika - 'Prabrajja Patrasathi Puraskar-2012' on 27 July 2012.
- He was Awarded by "Kali Kumar Kala Kendra, Berhampore", for his lifetime work in Art and Painting, on 23 December 2013 at Berhampore Grant Hall.
- He was Awarded with "Trinayonne Padak" (on 16 November 2014), Kandi Trinayonee Sahitya Sansad, Kandi, Murshidabad.
- Received Certificate of Honor from Biswabharati, Sreeniketan oi the occasion of "Gramin Kabi O Sahityiek Sammelan" as a poet, in the year of 2014, at Sreeniketan Sikshasatra Manch.
- He was Awarded with "Rahila Sahitya Padak" (on 22 February 2015), by Rahila Sanskriti Sangha, Salar, Murshidabad.
- He was awarded with "Biswanath De Sahitya Puraskar & Padak" by "Sutapa"-a little magazine of Dhanbad, Jharkhand, as the Editor of the "Best Little Magazine of the year-2015" on 8 November 2015 at Dhanbad, Jharkhand.
- He was awarded with "Tagore Village Sahitya Sammanana" on 27 November 2016 at Berhampore Rabindra Sadan by 'Chatak' Sahitya Patrika, published from Nadia district in the state of West Bengal.

== Awards from Bangladesh ==
- He was invited to Bangladesh, by "Bangladesh Jatiyo Sahityo Parishad, Chapai Nawabgunj Sakha" to attend a literary assembly of the poets and writers of both the countries of India and Bangladesh, during 14 December 2015 to 17 December 2015, and attended many social, cultural, and literary functions & seminars, and also received felicitation from twelve organizations there. As follows -
1. "Bangladesh Jatiyo Sahityo Parishad, Dhaka", "Smarak", awarded by Honorable Sirajul Karim, general secretary of the organization.
2. "Bangladesh Jatiyo Sahityo Parishad, Chapai Nawabgunj Sakha" Sammana-Smarak, awarded by Honorable Mohit Kumar Dwan and Prof. Saidur Rahaman.
3. "Chapai-Nawabgunj Municipality" felicitated him, a "Subhechha - Smarak" was awarded to him by the Mayor.
4. Attended an 'International Level Seminar', arranged by "Nawabgun Govt. College", Bengali Department, received "Subhechha - Smarak" awarded to him by Prof. Mazharul Islam Toru, departmental head, Bangla Department, of the same college.
5. Felicitated by "Exim Bank Agricultural University", awarded by Vice Chancellor of the University Honorable Golam Kibria.
6. "Chapai-Nawabgunj Mukta-Mahadal (Scout)" felicitated him on their 40th anniversary of foundation, awarded by founder secretary Advocate Md. Mosfiqur Rahaman.
7. Felicitated on the opening of the book titled "Vijay", felicitated by Poet, Playwright, Writer and editor Honorable Golam Rabbani Tota.
8. "Namosankarbati Uccha Vidyalaya", the Headmaster Mr. Aslam Kabir, felicitated him.
9. Awarded by Renowned Author of Bangladesh honorable Hasan Azizul Huq at the function of 'Bangladesh Jatiyo Sahitya Parished' 'Sahitya O Sanskritic Utsav - 2015' at Bangladesh Shilpakala Academy.
10. 'Imperial Polytechnic Institute' and 'Peace International School & College' felicitated and awarded him on his unparalleled contribution in 'Bengali Poetry and Journalism', awarded by the managing director of the said organization Honorable Md. Afsar Ali.'
11. 'Hriday Multimedia Preparatory School' Chapai-Nawabgunj awarded him.
12. He has been certified by honorable Dr. Rejia Sultana, the principal of "Nawabgunj Govt. College" for presenting a paper titled "Biswa Shilpakala o Bangladesh" (The world Arts and Bangladesh) in the 'International Level Seminar' arranged at "Nawabgunj Govt. College" on 16 December 2015.
