= Subrata Maitra (politician) =

Indian politician

Subrata Maitra (Kanchan)

Member of the West Bengal Legislative Assembly
- Incumbent
- Assumed office 2 May 2021
- Preceded by: Manoj Chakraborty
- Constituency: Baharampur

Personal details
- Party: Bharatiya Janata Party
- Education: B.Sc.
- Alma mater: Murshidabad Maharaja Krishnanath University
- Profession: Politician, Social Worker, Businessman

Subrata Maitra (Kanchan) is an Indian politician from Bharatiya Janata Party. In May 2021, he was elected as a member of the West Bengal Legislative Assembly from Baharampur. He defeated Naru Gopal Mukherjee of AITC by 26,852 votes in 2021 West Bengal Assembly election. This was the first time after India's Independence that a BJP leader is holding MLA Position from Berhampore seat in Vidhan Sabha Election.
