= Jibanti railway station =

Railway station in West Bengal, India

General information
- Location: Jibanti, Murshidabad district, West Bengal; India
- Coordinates: 24°04′15″N 88°11′19″E
- Elevation: 21 m (69 ft)
- System: Passenger train station
- Owner: Indian Railways
- Operator: Eastern Railway zone
- Line: Barharwa–Azimganj–Katwa loop
- Platforms: 2
- Tracks: 2

Construction
- Structure type: Standard (on ground station)
- Parking: Yes

Other information
- Status: Active
- Station code: JVT
- Zone(s): Eastern Railway zone
- Division(s): Howrah

History
- Former names: East Indian Railway Company

Services
Preceding station	Indian Railways	Following station
Khagraghat Road towards ?	Eastern Railway zone Azimganj–Katwa line	Karna Subarna towards ?
Location

Jibanti railway station is a railway station on the Howrah–Azimganj line of Howrah railway division of Eastern Railway zone. It is located beside National Highway 11, Jibanti village of Murshidabad district in the Indian state of West Bengal.

== History ==
In 1913, the Hooghly–Katwa Railway constructed a 5 ft 6 in (1,676 mm) broad gauge line from Bandel to Katwa, and the Barharwa–Azimganj–Katwa Railway constructed the 5 ft 6 in (1,676 mm) broad gauge Barharwa–Azimganj–Katwa loop. With the construction of the Farakka Barrage and opening of the railway bridge in 1971, the railway communication picture of this line were completely changed. Number of local trains stop at Jibanti railway station. The rail distance between Jibanti and Howrah is approximately 197 km.
