= Khagraghat Road railway station =

Railway station in West Bengal, India

KHAGRAGHAT ROAD খাগড়াঘাট রোড
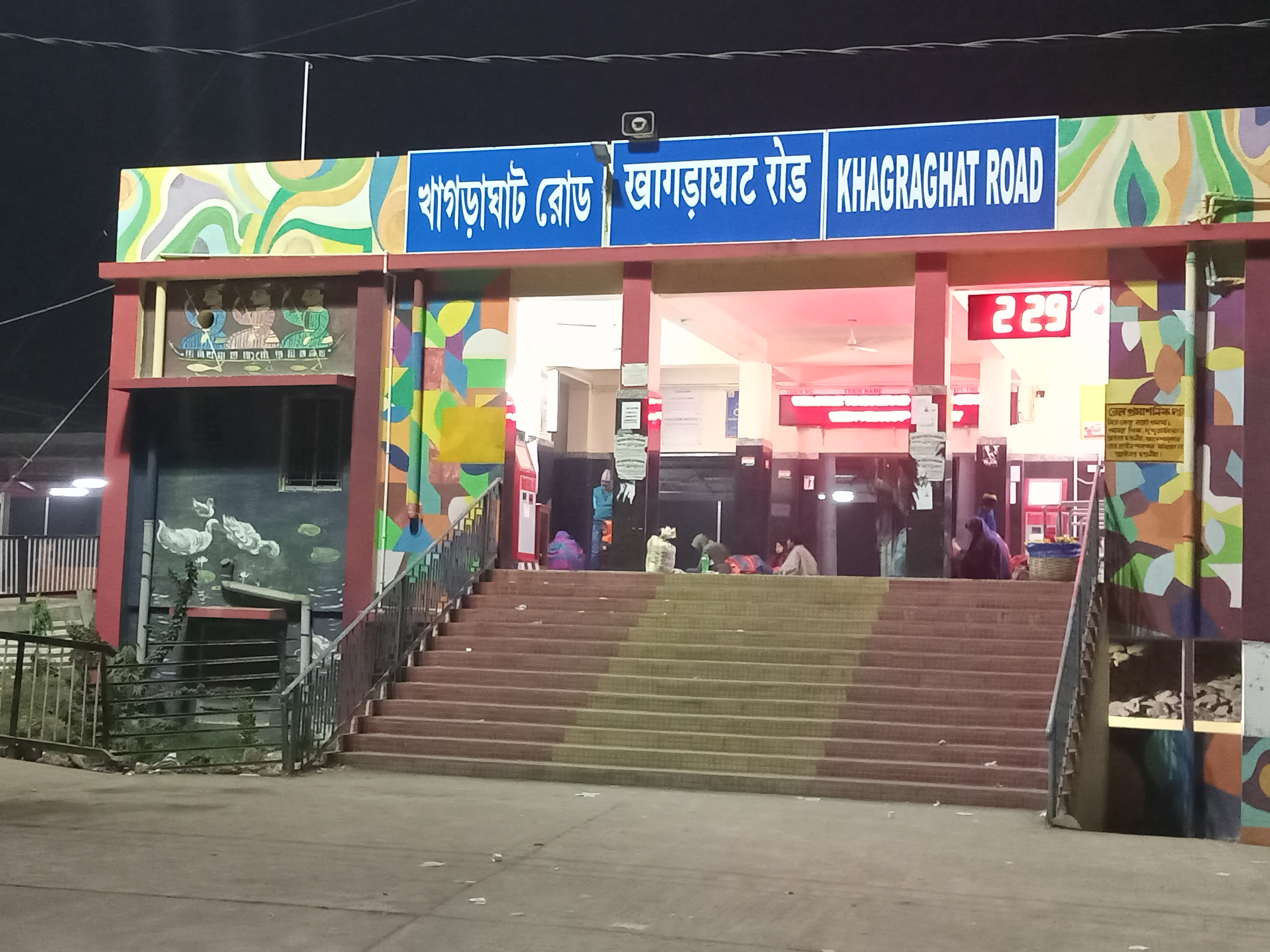

General information
- Location: Berhampore, Murshidabad district, West Bengal; India
- Coordinates: 24°06′34″N 88°13′44″E
- Elevation: 22 m (72 ft)
- System: Express train and Passenger train station
- Owner: Indian Railways
- Operator: Eastern Railway zone
- Lines: Howrah-NJP Loop Line; Barharwa–Azimganj–Katwa loop
- Platforms: 4
- Tracks: 4

Construction
- Structure type: At grade
- Parking: yes
- Accessible: yes

Other information
- Status: Active
- Station code: KGLE
- Zone(s): Eastern Railway
- Division(s): Howrah
- Classification: NSG-4

History
- Former names: East Indian Railway Company

Services
Preceding station	Indian Railways	Following station
Jibanti towards Katwa Junction	Eastern Railway zone Barharwa–Azimganj–Katwa loop	Niyalish Para towards Barharwa Junction
Location
- Interactive map

Khagraghat Road is a railway station on the Barharwa–Azimganj–Katwa loop in Baharampur city and is located in Murshidabad district in the Indian state of West Bengal. Khagraghat Road serves westside of Baharampur.It is classified as an NSG-4 category station under the jurisdiction of the Howrah Division in Eastern Railway.

== Revenue ==
Revenue Details of Khagraghat Road railway station
Financial Year	Category	Revenue (INR)	Approximate Value
2024–25	Reservation Tickets – PRS	₹59,554,925	Nearly ₹5.96 crore
2024–25	Unreserved Tickets – UTS	₹52,352,610	Nearly ₹5.24 crore
2024–25	Total (PRS + UTS)	₹113,996,129	Nearly ₹11.40 crore
2023–24	Total (PRS + UTS)	₹104,295,486	Nearly ₹10.43 crore

== History ==
In 1913, the Hooghly–Katwa Railway constructed a 5 ft 6 in (1,676 mm) broad gauge line from Bandel to Katwa, and the Barharwa–Azimganj–Katwa Railway constructed the 5 ft 6 in (1,676 mm) broad gauge Barharwa–Azimganj–Katwa loop. With the construction of the Farakka Barrage and opening of the railway bridge in 1971, the railway communication picture of the area completely changed.

The rail distance between Berhampore and Sealdah is approximately 205 km.

== Location ==
KhagraGhat Road railway station lies on the Western Bank of River Bhagirathi (Ganga) in the Radharghat locality of Berhampore city. The line passes through Howrah–Chandannagar-Chuchura-Bandel-Nabadwip-Katwa-Salar-Khagraghat-Azimganj. It is located in Murshidabad district, 205 km (127 mi) from Howrah railway station. It is one of the important railway stations in Murshidabad and is second important station in Berhampore(the other being Berhampore Court railway station) town which lies on the Eastern side of Bhagirathi river. People from maximum part of Southern Murshidabad district board from this station to reach North Bengal.

== Important Trains ==
Several major trains have scheduled stoppages at Khagraghat Road station.
Train Name	Route
Katwa Jn–Azimganj Jn DEMU Passenger	Katwa Jn → Azimganj Jn
Nimtita–Katwa Jn DEMU Passenger	Nimtita → Katwa Jn
Rampurhat–Katwa Jn MEMU Passenger (via Azimganj Jn)	Rampurhat → Azimganj Jn → Katwa Jn
Sealdah–Jangipur Road MEMU Passenger	Sealdah →Nabadwip Dham –Jangipur Road
Puri–Howrah–Kamakhya Express	Puri → Howrah → Bandel → Nabadwip Dham–Katwa → Berhampore (Khagraghat) → Azimganj → Malda → Siliguri Jn → Kamakhya
Sealdah–New Alipurduar Teesta Torsha Express	Sealdah → Naihati → Bandel → Nabadwip Dham–Katwa → Berhampore (Khagraghat) → Azimganj → Malda → New Jalpaiguri → New Alipurduar
Sealdah–Haldibari Link Teesta–Torsa Express	Sealdah → Naihati → Bandel → Nabadwip Dham–Katwa → Berhampore (Khagraghat) → Azimganj → Malda → New Jalpaiguri → Haldibari
Howrah–Malda Town Intercity Express	Howrah → Azimganj Jn → Malda Town
Howrah–Azimganj Jn DEMU Passenger	Howrah → Azimganj Jn
Howrah–Dibrugarh Kamrup Express	Howrah → Bandel →Nabadwip Dham–Katwa → Berhampore (Khagraghat) → Azimganj → Malda → New Jalpaiguri → Dibrugarh
Kolkata–Radhikapur Express	Kolkata → Naihati → Bandel →Nabadwip Dham–Berhampore (Khagraghat) → Katwa → Azimganj → Malda → Radhikapur
Sealdah–Saharsa Jn Hate Bazare Express	Sealdah → Naihati → Bandel → Nabadwip Dham–Katwa → Berhampore (Khagraghat) → Azimganj → Malda → Purnia → Saharsa Jn
Sealdah–Saharsa Jn Hatey Bazare Express	Sealdah → Naihati → Bandel → Katwa Nabadwip Dham–→ Berhampore (Khagraghat) → Azimganj → Malda → Saharsa Jn
Howrah–Katihar Express	Howrah → Bandel → Nabadwip Dham–Katwa → Berhampore (Khagraghat) → Azimganj → Malda → Katihar
Digha–Howrah–New Jalpaiguri Paharia Express	Digha → Kanthi → Howrah → Bandel →Nabadwip Dham–Katwa → Berhampore (Khagraghat) → Azimganj → Malda → New Jalpaiguri

== Infrastructure ==
The station has a total of four platforms and serves as a halt for 50 trains. The station is situated on a double electric line, allowing simultaneous train movements in both directions under full electrification.

== Time table ==
- UP TRAINS
- 13145 Kolkata–Radhikapur Express (Kolkata, Bandel, Katwa, Berhampore (KhagraGhat), Azimganj, Malda, Radhikapur)
- 13169 Sealdah–Saharsa Jn Hatey Bazrare Express via Purnia (Tuesday and Thursday)(Sealdah, Bandel, Katwa, Berhampore (KhagraGhat), Azimganj, Malda, Purnia, Saharsa Jn)
- 13163 Sealdah–Saharsa Jn Hatey Bazrare Express (Sunday, Monday, Wednesday, Friday and Saturday) (Sealdah, Bandel, Katwa, Berhampore (KhagraGhat), Azimganj, Malda, Saharsa Jn)
- 15721 Digha–New Jalpaiguri Paharia Express (Saturday from Digha) (Digha, Howrah, Bandel, Katwa, Berhampore (KhagraGhat), Azimganj, Malda, NJP (on Sunday))
- 13033 Howrah–Katihar Express (Howrah, Bandel, Katwa, Berhampore (KhagraGhat), Azimganj, Malda, Katihar)
- 13421 Nabadwip Dham-Malda Town Express (Nabadwip, Katwa, Berhampore (KhagraGhat), Azimganj, Malda)
- 53435 Katwa–Azimganj Passenger (Katwa, Berhampore (KhagraGhat), Azimganj)
- 53005 Katwa–Azimganj Passenger (Katwa, Berhampore (KhagraGhat), Azimganj)
- 53007 Katwa-Rampurhat Passenger (Katwa, Berhampore (Khagraghat), Azimganj, Nalhati, Rampurhat)
- 73151 Sealdah–Jangipur DEMU Passenger (Sealdah, Naihati, Bandel, Katwa, Berhampore (KhagraGhat), Azimganj, Jangipur)
- 15643 Puri–Kamakhya Express (Saturday from Puri) (Puri, Bhubaneswar, Kharagpur, Howrah, Bandel, Katwa, Berhampore (KhagraGhat), Azimganj, Malda, New Jalpaiguri, AlipurDuar, Kamakhya (on Monday))
- 53009 Katwa–Azimganj Passenger (Katwa, Berhampore (KhagraGhat), Azimganj)
- 73035 Katwa-Nimtita Passenger (Katwa, Berhampore (KhagraGhat), Azimganj, Jangipur, Nimtita)
- 53011 Katwa–Azimganj Passenger (Katwa, Berhampore (KhagraGhat), Azimganj)
- 73031 Katwa–Azimganj Passenger (Katwa, Berhampore (KhagraGhat), Azimganj)
- 53013 Katwa–Azimganj Passenger (Katwa, Berhampore (KhagraGhat), Azimganj)
- 13141 Sealdah–New AlipurDuar Teesta Torsha Express (Sealdah, Naihati, Bandel, Katwa, Berhampore (KhagraGhat), Azimganj, Malda, New Jalpaiguri, New AlipurDuar)
- 13465 Howrah–Malda Town Intercity Express (Howrah, Bandel, Berhampore (KhagraGhat), Azimganj, Mald)
- 53015 Katwa–Azimganj Passenger (Katwa, Berhampore (KhagraGhat), Azimganj)
- 53017 Katwa–Azimganj Passenger (Katwa, Berhampore (KhagraGhat), Azimganj)
- 53001 Howrah–Azimganj Passenger (Howrah, Bandel, Katwa, Berhampore (KhagraGhat), Azimganj)
- 15959 Howrah–Dibrugarh Kamrup Express (Howrah, Bandel, Katwa, Berhampore (KhagraGhat), Azimganj, Malda, New Jalpaiguri, New AlipurDuar, Guwahati, Dibrugarh)
- 53019 Katwa–Azimganj Passenger (Katwa, Berhampore (KhagraGhat), Azimganj)

== See also ==
- Berhampore Court railway station
- Azimganj Junction railway station
- Katwa Junction railway station
- Malda Town railway station
