= Gora Bazar =

- Census Town
- Location in West Bengal, India Gora Bazar (India)
- Coordinates: 24.08733°N 88.249143°E
- Country: India
- State: West Bengal
- District: Murshidabad

Area
  - Total: 1.79 km^{2} (0.69 sq mi)

Population (2011)
  - Total: 5,200
  - Density: 2,900/km^{2} (7,500/sq mi)

Languages
  - Official: Bengali, English
- Time zone: UTC+5:30 (IST)
- Vehicle registration: WB
- Lok Sabha constituency: Baharampur
- Vidhan Sabha constituency: Baharampur
- Website: wb.gov.in

Gora Bazar located in the city of Berhampore is a census town located in the community development block of Berhampore, Berhampore subdivision, Murshidabad district, West Bengal, India. It is situated at an elevation of 22 meters above sea level.

== Geography ==
Cities, towns and locations in the Berhampore and Kandi subdivisions, Murshidabad district
M: municipal town, CT: census town, R: rural/ urban centre, H: historical centres
Owing to space constraints in the small map, the actual locations in a larger map may vary slightly

=== Location ===
Gora Bazar is located at 24.08733°N 88.249143°E.

=== Area overview ===
The area shown in the map alongside, covering Berhampore and Kandi subdivisions, is spread across both the natural physiographic regions of the district, Rarh and Bagri. The headquarters of Murshidabad district, Berhampore, is in this area. The ruins of Karnasubarna, the capital of Shashanka, the first important king of ancient Bengal who ruled in the 7th century, is located 9.6 kilometres (6.0 mi) south-west of Berhampore. The entire area is overwhelmingly rural with over 80% of the population living in the rural areas.

Note: The map alongside presents some of the notable locations in the subdivisions. All places marked in the map are linked in the larger full screen map.

== Demographics ==
According to the 2011 Census of India, Gora Bazar had a total population of 5,200, of which 2,643 (51%) were males and 2,557 (49%) were females. Population in the age range 0–6 years was 390. The total number of literate persons in Gora Bazar was 4,678 (97.26% of the population over 6 years).

As per 2001 Census of India, Gora Bazar had a population of 7,714. Males constitute 52% of the population and females 48%. Gora Bazar has an average literacy rate of 88%, higher than the national average of 59.5%: male literacy is 90%, and female literacy is 85%. In Gora Bazar, 8% of the population is under 6 years of age.

== Infrastructure ==
According to the District Census Handbook, Murshidabad, 2011, Gora Bazar covered an area of 1.79 km^{2}. It had 15 km roads with open drains. The protected water-supply involved overhead tank, tube well/ bore well, hand pump. It had 528 domestic electric connections, 100 road lighting points. Among the medical facilities it had 1 dispensary/ health centre, 3 medicine shops. Among the educational facilities, it had 1 middle school, 1 secondary school, 1 senior secondary school in town, general degree college at Berhampore 1 km away. It had branch office of 1 nationalised bank.
