= Khagra =

Khagra is a locality of Baharampur in Murshidabad district in the Indian state of West Bengal. It is renowned for its manufacture of bell-metal and brass utensils, as well as ivory and wood carving.

== Geography ==
Khagra is situated on the east bank of the Bhagirathi-Hooghly. Khagra Ghat is on the west bank of the river.

== Economy ==
=== Utensil manufacture ===
Khagra is a centre for the manufacture of bell metal (locally known as kansa) and brass utensils. These have a traditional demand in the local markets and some are also exported. The problem of procuring raw materials and changing customer preference for stainless steel, plastic and ceramics is adversely affecting the industry.

=== Ivory and wood carving ===
Khagra was a major centre of ivory carving. With restrictions on ivory trade, the artisans have moved to sandalwood carving.

=== Sweets ===
Khagra produces good quality chanabora and khaja, a local speciality.

=== Shola art ===
Khagra is a centre of Shola art.
