= Niyalish Para railway station =

Railway station in West Bengal, India

General information
- Location: Belun, Niyalish Para, Murshidabad district, West Bengal; India
- Coordinates: 24°43′53″N 88°08′28″E
- Elevation: 23 m (75 ft)
- System: Passenger train station
- Owner: Indian Railways
- Operator: Eastern Railway zone
- Line: Barharwa–Azimganj–Katwa loop Line
- Platforms: 1
- Tracks: 2

Construction
- Structure type: Standard (on-ground station)
- Parking: No

Other information
- Status: Active
- Station code: NLSF
- Zone(s): Eastern Railway zone
- Division(s): Howrah

History
- Former names: East Indian Railway Company

Services
Preceding station	Indian Railways	Following station
Khagraghat Road towards ?	Eastern Railway zone Azimganj–Katwa line	Lalbag Court Road towards ?
Location

Niyalish Para railway station is a halt railway station on the Howrah–Azimganj line of Howrah railway division of Eastern Railway zone. It is located at Belun, Niyalish Para of Murshidabad district in the Indian state of West Bengal.

== History ==
In 1913, the Hooghly–Katwa Railway constructed a 5 ft 6 in (1,676 mm) broad gauge line from Bandel to Katwa, and the Barharwa–Azimganj–Katwa Railway constructed the 5 ft 6 in (1,676 mm) broad gauge Barharwa–Azimganj–Katwa loop. With the construction of the Farakka Barrage and opening of the railway bridge in 1971, the railway communication picture of this line were completely changed. Total 13 local trains stop at Niyalish Para railway station. The rail distance between Niyalish Para and Howrah is approximately 216 km.
