= Chhenabara =

Sweetmeat from the Indian subcontinent

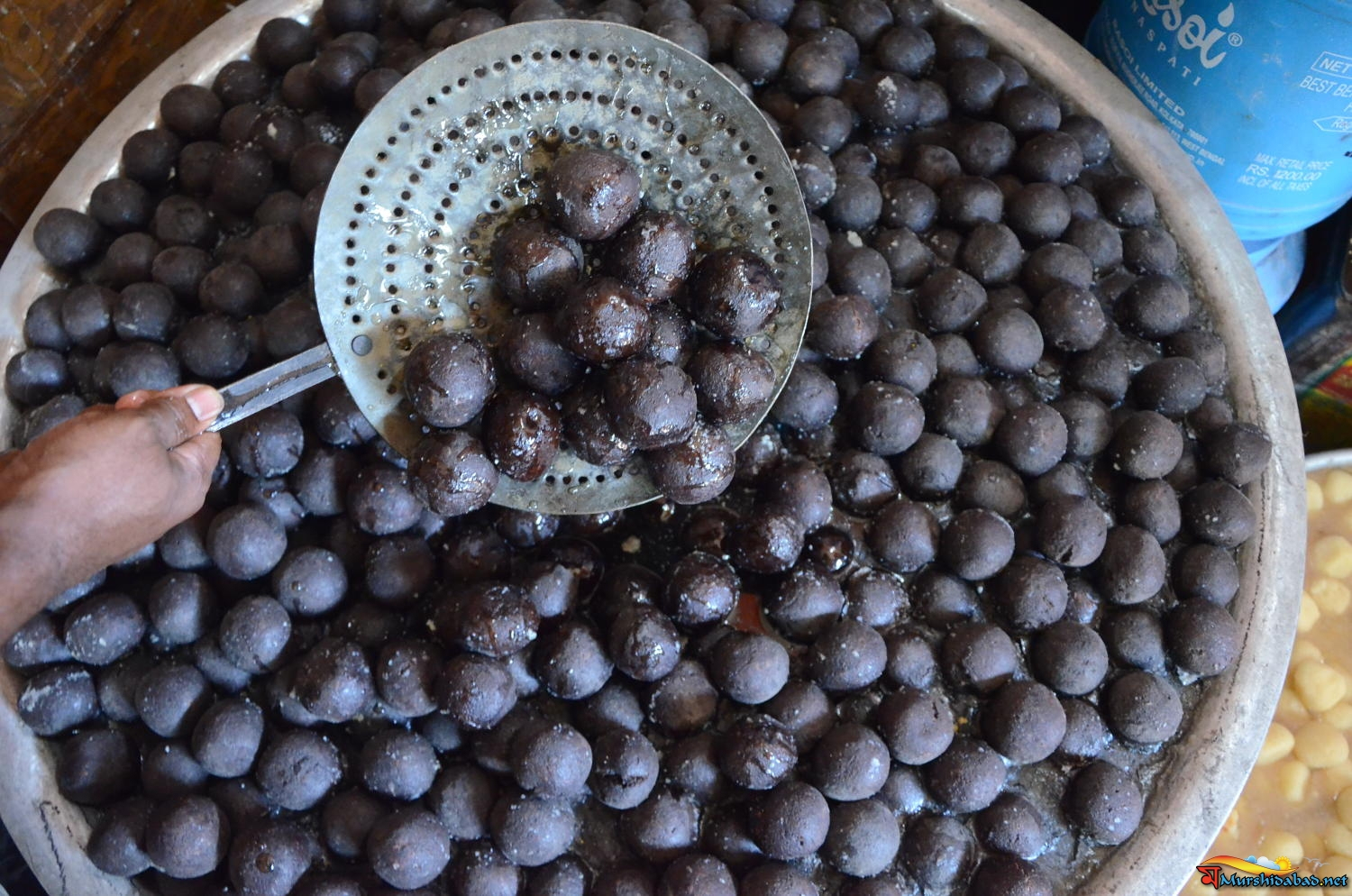
"Chana-Bora" sweets of Berhampore

Chhanabora is a sweetmeat from the Indian subcontinent made from chhena and syrup. It is attested from the 16th century. It is related to rosogolla and pantua, sharing a cottage cheese basis with the former and a burnt brown crust with the latter. According to local legend, it was created when Maharaja Manindrachandra Nandi of Cossimbazar ordered his cook to create a dessert that was neither rosogolla nor pantua. It is common in Murshidabad and outsize chhanabora are a common gift for high-ranking visitors.
