= Manoj Chakraborty =

Indian politician

Minister of State for Parliamentary Affairs, Government of West Bengal
- In office 20 May 2011 – 18 January 2012

MLA
- In office 2006–2021
- Preceded by: Maya Rani Paul
- Succeeded by: Subrata Moitra (Kanchan)
- Constituency: Baharampur

Personal details
- Born: 8 April 1954 (age 72) Darjeeling, West Bengal, India
- Party: Indian National Congress
- Education: Berhampore College (B.Com)

Manoj Chakraborty is an Indian politician and was Minister of State for Parliamentary Affairs in the Government of West Bengal. He was also an MLA, elected from the Baharampur constituency in the 2011 West Bengal state assembly election.

Manoj Chakraborty resigned from the state cabinet on 18 January 2012.

Manoj Chakraborty shot into prominence when in the 2006 state assembly elections as an independent he won the Berhampore assembly seat defeating his nearest rival Amal Karmakar of RSP. Manoj Chakraborty, contesting as an independent, was a rebel Congress candidate put up by Adhir Choudhury as a protest against the official Congress candidate Maya Rani Paul.
