= Baharampur Assembly constituency =

West Bengal Legislative Assembly constituency

Baharampur
- Constituency No. 72 for the West Bengal Legislative Assembly
- Interactive Map Outlining Baharampur Assembly Constituency

Constituency details
- Country: India
- Region: East India
- State: West Bengal
- District: Murshidabad
- Lok Sabha constituency: Baharampur
- Established: 1951
- Total electors: 260,667
- Reservation: None

Member of Legislative Assembly
- 18th West Bengal Legislative Assembly
- Incumbent Subrata Maitra
- Party: BJP
- Alliance: NDA
- Elected year: 2026

Baharampur Assembly constituency is an assembly constituency in Murshidabad district in the Indian state of West Bengal.

Most Successful parties from Baharampur assembly
1. Indian National Congress (10 times) (55.5%)
2. Communist Party of India (2 times) (11.1%)
3. Revolutionary Socialist Party (3 times) (16.7%)
4. Independent politician (1 time) (5.56%)
5. Bharatiya Janata Party (2 times) (11.1%)

== Overview ==
As per orders of the Delimitation Commission, No. 72 Baharampur Assembly constituency covers Baharampur municipality, and Bhakuri I, Daulatabad, Gurudaspur, Hatinagar and Manindranagar gram panchayats of Berhampore community development block.

Baharampur Assembly constituency is part of No. 10 Baharampur Lok Sabha constituency.

== Members of the Legislative Assembly ==
Year	Name	Party
Berhampore
1951	Bijoy Kumar Ghosh	Indian National Congress
1957	Bijoy Kumar Ghosh	Indian National Congress
1962	Sanat Kumar Raha	Communist Party of India
1967	S. Bhattacharya	Indian National Congress
1969	Sanat Kumar Raha	Communist Party of India
1971	Sankar Das Paul	Indian National Congress
1972	Sankar Das Paul	Indian National Congress
1977	Debabrata Bandyopadhyay	Revolutionary Socialist Party
1982	Debabrata Bandyopadhyay	Revolutionary Socialist Party
1987	Debabrata Bandyopadhyay	Revolutionary Socialist Party
1991	Sankar Das Paul	Indian National Congress
1996	Maya Rani Paul	Indian National Congress
2001	Maya Rani Paul	Indian National Congress
2006	Manoj Chakraborty	Independent politician
Major boundary changes; constituency renamed as Baharampur
2011	Manoj Chakraborty	Indian National Congress
2016	Manoj Chakraborty	Indian National Congress
2021	Subrata Maitra	Bharatiya Janata Party
2026	Subrata Maitra	Bharatiya Janata Party

== Election results ==
=== 2026 ===
2026 West Bengal Legislative Assembly election: Baharampur
Party	Candidate	Votes	%	±%
BJP	Subrata Maitra	91,088	40.62	▼4.59
INC	Adhir Ranjan Chowdhury	73,540	32.79	▲12.46
AITC	Naru Gopal Mukherjee	49,586	22.11	▼9.51
AJUP	Sukbor Molla	4,207	1.88	New entry
NOTA	None of the above	1,359	0.61	▼0.67
Majority		17,548	7.83	▼5.76
Turnout		224,268	92.89	▲17.08
BJP hold		Swing		

=== 2021 ===
2021 West Bengal Legislative Assembly election: Baharampur
Party	Candidate	Votes	%	±%
BJP	Subrata Maitra	89,340	45.21	
AITC	Naru Gopal Mukherjee	62,488	31.62	
INC	Manoj Chakraborty	40,167	20.33	
NOTA	None of the above	2,525	1.28	
Majority		26,852	13.59	
Turnout		197,607	75.81	
BJP gain from INC		Swing		

=== 2016 ===
2016 West Bengal Legislative Assembly election: Baharampur
Party	Candidate	Votes	%	±%
INC	Manoj Chakraborty	127,762	67.89	▲12.99
AITC	Sujata Banerjee	35,489	18.86	New entry
BJP	Mala Banerjee	18,805	9.99	▲2.34
NOTA	None of the above	3,523	1.87	New entry
Majority		92,273	49.03	▲23.06
Turnout		1,88,187	79.53	▼1.39
INC hold		Swing		

=== 2011 ===
2011 West Bengal Legislative Assembly election: Baharampur
Party	Candidate	Votes	%	±%
INC	Manoj Chakraborty	91,578	54.90	
RSP	Tarit Brahmachari	48,265	28.93	
BJP	Debasis Sarkar	12,758	7.65	
Independent	Debjani Saha	8,162	4.89	
SDPI	Tayebdul Islam	3,787	2.27	
IPFB	Sujit Kumar Das	1,331	0.80	
JD(U)	Sunil Kumar Mondal	940	0.60	
Majority		43,313	26.0	
Turnout		166,821	81.13	
INC hold		Swing		

=== 2006 ===
In the 2006 West Bengal Legislative Assembly election Manoj Chakraborty, Independent, won the Berhampore assembly seat defeating his nearest rival Amal Karmakar of RSP. Manoj Chakraborty, contesting as an independent, was a rebel congress candidate put up by Adhir Choudhury as a protest against the official Congress candidate Maya Rani Paul. He was subsequently taken back into the Congress. Contests in most years were multi cornered but only winners and runners are being mentioned. Maya Rani Paul of Congress defeated Kartick Sahana of RSP in 2001, and Biswanath Banerjee of RSP in 1996. Sankar Das Paul of Congress defeated Ipsita Gupta of RSP in 1991. Debabrata Bandopadhyay of RSP defeated Sankar Das Paul of Congress in 1987 and 1982, and Subrata Saha of Congress in 1977.

=== 1972 ===
Sankar Das Paul of Congress won in 1972 and 1971. Sanat Kumar Raha of CPI won in 1969. S. Bhattacharya of Congress won in 1967. Sanat Kumar Raha of CPI won in 1962. Bejoy Kumar Ghosh of Congress won in 1957 and in independent India's first election in 1951.
