= Mahesail =

- Village
- Location in West Bengal, India Mahesail (India)
- Coordinates: 24.5893°N 88.0092°E
- Country: India
- State: West Bengal
- District: Murshidabad
- Elevation: 26 m (85 ft)

Population (2011)
  - Total: 16,178

Languages
  - Official: Bengali, English
- Time zone: UTC+5:30 (IST)
- PIN: 742201 (Aurangabad)
- Telephone/STD code: 03485
- Lok Sabha constituency: Jangipur
- Vidhan Sabha constituency: Suti
- Website: murshidabad.gov.in

Mahesail is a village and a gram panchayat in the Suti II CD block in the Jangipur subdivision of Murshidabad district in the state of West Bengal, India.

== Geography ==
Cities, towns and locations in the northern portion of Jangipur subdivision, Murshidabad district (including Farakka, Samserganj, Suti II CD blocks)
M: municipal town, CT: census town, R: rural/ urban centre, F: Facility
Abbreviation- TPS: Thermal Power Station
Owing to space constraints in the small map, the actual locations in a larger map may vary slightly

=== Location ===
Mahesail is located at 24.5893°N 88.0092°E.

=== Area overview ===
Jangipur subdivision is crowded with 52 census towns and as such it had to be presented in two location maps. One of the maps can be seen alongside. The subdivision is located in the Rarh region that is spread over from adjoining Santhal Pargana division of Jharkhand. The land is slightly higher in altitude than the surrounding plains and is gently undulating. The river Ganges, along with its distributaries, is prominent in both the maps. At the head of the subdivision is the 2,245 m long Farakka Barrage, one of the largest projects of its kind in the country. Murshidabad district shares with Bangladesh a porous international border which is notoriously crime prone (partly shown in this map). The subdivision has two large power plants - the 2,100 MW Farakka Super Thermal Power Station and the 1,600 MW Sagardighi Thermal Power Station. According to a 2016 report, there are around 1,000,000 (1 million/ ten lakh) workers engaged in the beedi industry in Jangipur subdivision. 90% are home-based and 70% of the home-based workers are women. As of 2013, an estimated 2.4 million people reside along the banks of the Ganges alone in Murshidabad district. Severe erosion occurs along the banks.

Note: The two maps present some of the notable locations in the subdivision. All places marked in the maps are linked in the larger full screen maps.

== Demographics ==
According to the 2011 Census of India, Mahesail had a total population of 16,178, of which 8,233 (51%) were males and 7,945 (49%) were females. Population in the age range 0–6 years was 3,006. The total number of literate persons in Mahesail was 6,648 (50.47% of the population over 6 years).

== Transport ==
National Highway 12 (old numbering NH 34) passes through Mahesail. This section is locally popular as Badshahi Road.

== Healthcare ==
Mahesail Rural Hospital, with 30 beds, is a major medical facility in Suti II CD block.

See also - Healthcare in West Bengal
