= Chakmeghoan =

- Census Town
- Location in West Bengal, India Chakmeghoan (India)
- Coordinates: 24.5863°N 88.0523°E
- State: West Bengal
- District: Murshidabad

Area
  - Total: 1.252 km^{2} (0.483 sq mi)

Population (2011)
  - Total: 5,360
  - Density: 4,280/km^{2} (11,100/sq mi)

Languages
  - Official: Bengali, English
- Time zone: UTC+5:30 (IST)
- PIN: 712403
- Telephone/STD code: 03485
- Vehicle registration: WB-57, WB-58
- Lok Sabha constituency: Jangipur
- Vidhan Sabha constituency: Suti
- Website: murshidbad.nic.in

Chakmeghoan is a census town in the Suti II CD block in the Jangipur subdivision of the Murshidabad district in the state of West Bengal, India.

== Geography ==
Cities, towns and locations in the northern portion of Jangipur subdivision, Murshidabad district (including Farakka, Samserganj, Suti II CD blocks)
M: municipal town, CT: census town, R: rural/ urban centre, F: Facility
Abbreviation- TPS: Thermal Power Station
Owing to space constraints in the small map, the actual locations in a larger map may vary slightly

=== Location ===
Chakmeghoan is located at 24.5863°N 88.0523°E.

According to the map of Suti II CD block in the District Census Handbook, Murshidabad, Dafahat, Jagtaj, Debipur, Aurangabad, Hafania, Mahendrapur, Paschim Punropara, Bhabki, Khidirpur, Khanpur, Ichhlampur, Chakmeghoan and Kakramari, form a cluster of census towns.

=== Area overview ===
Jangipur subdivision is crowded with 52 census towns and as such it had to be presented in two location maps. One of the maps can be seen alongside. The subdivision is located in the Rarh region that is spread over from adjoining Santhal Pargana division of Jharkhand. The land is slightly higher in altitude than the surrounding plains and is gently undulating. The river Ganges, along with its distributaries, is prominent in both the maps. At the head of the subdivision is the 2,245 m long Farakka Barrage, one of the largest projects of its kind in the country. Murshidabad district shares with Bangladesh a porous international border which is notoriously crime prone (partly shown in this map). The subdivision has two large power plants - the 2,100 MW Farakka Super Thermal Power Station and the 1,600 MW Sagardighi Thermal Power Station. According to a 2016 report, there are around 1,000,000 (1 million/ ten lakh) workers engaged in the beedi industry in Jangipur subdivision. 90% are home-based and 70% of the home-based workers are women. As of 2013, an estimated 2.4 million people reside along the banks of the Ganges alone in Murshidabad district. Severe erosion occurs along the banks.

Note: The two maps present some of the notable locations in the subdivision. All places marked in the maps are linked in the larger full screen maps.

== Demographics ==
According to the 2011 Census of India, Chakmeghoan had a total population of 5,360, of which 2,718 (51%) were males and 2,642 (49%) were females. Population in the age range 0–6 years was 1,018. The total number of literate persons in Chakmeghoan was 2,132 (49.10% of the population over 6 years).

== Infrastructure ==
According to the District Census Handbook, Murshidabad, 2011, Chakmeghoan covered an area of 1.252 km^{2}The protected water-supply involved hand pump. It had 180 domestic electric connections. Among the medical facilities it had 1 medicine shop. Among the educational facilities, it had 1 primary school, other school facilities at nearby localities, general degree college at Aurangabad 3 km away. It had 2 recognised shorthand, typewriting & vocational training institutes, 8 non-formal education centres (Sarva Shiksha Abhiyan). Among the social, recreational & cultural facilities it had 8 old age homes. It had the branch office of 1 nationalised bank.

== Healthcare ==
Suti II CD block is one of the areas of Murshidabad district where ground water is affected by a high level of arsenic contamination. The WHO guideline for arsenic in drinking water is 10 mg/ litre, and the Indian Standard value is 50 mg/ litre. The maximum concentration in Suti II CD block is 1,852 mg/litre.
