= Suti II =

- Community development block
- Interactive map of Suti II
- Coordinates: 24.598°N 88.034°E
- Country: India
- State: West Bengal
- District: Murshidabad
- Administrative Division: Malda

Government
  - Type: Federal democracy

Area
  - Total: 94.86 km^{2} (36.63 sq mi)
- Elevation: 26 m (85 ft)

Population (2011)
  - Total: 278,922
  - Density: 2,940/km^{2} (7,615/sq mi)

Languages
  - Official: Bengali, English

Literacy
  - Literacy (2011): 55.23%
- Time zone: UTC+5:30 (IST)
- PIN: 742161 (Panchthupi); 742201 (Aurangabad)
- Telephone/STD code: 03485
- ISO 3166 code: IN-WB
- Vehicle registration: WB-57, WB-58
- Lok Sabha constituency: Jangipur
- Vidhan Sabha constituency: Suti
- Website: murshidbad.nic.in

Suti II is a community development block that forms an administrative division in the Jangipur subdivision of Murshidabad district in the Indian state of West Bengal. Aurangabad is the census town of Suti II block.

== Geography ==
Aurangabad, a census town in Suti II block, is located at 24°35′53″N 88°02′02″E

Suti II CD block lies in the Rarh region in Murshidabad district. The Bhagirathi River splits the district into two natural physiographic regions – Rarh on the west and Bagri on the east. The Padma River separates Murshidabad district from Malda district and Chapai Nawabganj and Rajshahi districts of Bangladesh in the north. The Rarh region is undulating and contains mostly clay and lateritic clay based soil. As the Rajmahal hills slopes gently down from adjoining Jharkhand it forms the Nabagram plain at the lowest edge of its elevation in this region. The eastern slope of the region is characterised by the existence of numerous cliffs and bluffs.

Suti II CD block is bounded by Samserganj CD block in the north, Chapai Nawabganj Sadar Upazila in Chapai Nawabganj District of Bangladesh, across the Ganges, in the east, Pakuria CD block in Pakur district of Jharkhand in the west, Suti I CD block in the south.

Murshidabad district has a 125.35 km long international border with Bangladesh of which 42.35 km is on land and the remaining is riverine. There are 9 blocks – Samserganj, Suti I, Suti II, Raghunathganj II, Lalgola, Bhagawangola I, Bhagawangola II, Raninagar II and Jalangi - along the Bangladesh-India border.

The Rarh region or the western part of the district is drained by the right bank tributaries of the Bhagirathi, flowing down from the hilly / plateau region of Santhal Pargana division in neighbouring Jharkhand. The Farakka Barrage regulates the flow of water into the Bhagirathi through the feeder canal. Thereafter, it is fed with the discharge from the Mayurakshi system. About 1,800 km^{2} of area in the neighbourhood of Kandi town is flooded by the combined discharge of the Mayurakshi, Dwarka, Brahmani, Gambhira, Kopai and Bakreshwar – the main contributor being the Mayurakshi. Certain other areas in the western sector also get flooded.

The 38.38 km long feeder canal takes off upstream of the Farakka Barrage and links with the Bhagirathi River just below the Jangipur Barrage. The feeder canal was constructed across the flow of the small flashy rivers such as Gumani, Trimohini and Kanloi. The discharges of the Trimohini and Kanloi were designed to flow into the feeder canal, and whenever the discharges of these rivers exceed the design capacity, they cause problems. The discharge of the Bagmari was designed to flow into the Ganga along its course through a siphone across the feeder canal. With the choking of the outlet to the Ganges, the flood discharge spills over to the basins of the Pagla and the Bansloi and floods around 100 km^{2}

A major problem in Murshidabad district is river bank erosion. As of 2013, an estimated 2.4 million people reside along the banks of the Ganges alone in Murshidabad district. Between 1931 and 1977, 26,769 hectares have been eroded and many villages have been fully submerged. 1980-1990 was a decade of erosion for this district and during the decade Giria, Sekhalipur, Khejustala, Mithipur, Fajilpur, Rajapur, Akheriganj, Parashpur villages were badly affected.

See also - River bank erosion along the Ganges in Malda and Murshidabad districts

Suti II CD block has an area of 111.13 km^{2}. It has 1 panchayat samity, 10 gram panchayats, 157 gram sansads (village councils), 44 mouzas and 24 inhabited villages. Suti police station serves this block. Headquarters of this CD block is at Dafahat.

Gram panchayats in Suti II block/ panchayat samiti are: Aurangabad I, Aurangabad II, Bajitpur, Jagtai I, Jagtai II, Kashimnagar, Laxmipur, Mahesail I, Mahesail II and Umrapur.

== Demographics ==
=== Population ===
According to the 2011 Census of India, Suti II CD block had a total population of 278,922, of which 110,767 were rural and 168,155 were urban. There were 139,995 (50%) males and 138,927 (50%) females. Population in the age range 0–6 years was 52,382. Scheduled Castes numbered 20,461 (7.34%) and Scheduled Tribes numbered 493 (0.18%).

As per 2001 census, Suti II block has a total population of 213,069, out of which 107,506 were males and 105,563 were females. Suti II block registered a population growth of 35.05 per cent during the 1991-2001 decade. Decadal growth for the district was 23.70 per cent. Decadal growth in West Bengal in 1991-2001 was 17.84 per cent.

Decadal Population Growth Rate (%)

- Suti II CD block
- Murshidabad district
- West Bengal

The decadal growth of population in Suti II CD Block in 2001-2011 was 30.82%.

The decadal growth rate of population in Murshidabad district was as follows: 33.5% in 1951-61, 28.6% in 1961-71, 25.5% in 1971-81, 28.2% in 1981-91, 23.8% in 1991-2001 and 21.1% in 2001-11. The decadal growth rate for West Bengal in 2001-11 was 13.93%.

The decadal growth rate of population in neighbouring Chapai Nawabganj District in Bangladesh was 15.59% for the decade 2001-2011, down from 21.67% in the decade 1991-2001.

There are reports of Bangladeshi infiltrators entering Murshidabad district.

=== Census towns and villages ===
Census towns in Suti II CD block were (2011 population figures in brackets): Jagtaj (11,261), Debipur (6,506), Dihigram (9562) Aurangabad (39,261), Mahendrapur (6,979), Hafania (8,171), Dafahat (15,688), Paschim Punropara (40,683), Ichhlampur (6,015), Chakmeghoan (5,360), Kakramari (9,423), Khanpur (5,510), Khidirpur (5,526) and Bhabki (7,772).

Large villages in Suti II CD block were (2011 population figures in brackets): Bauripuni (5,036), Umrapur (19,855), Bhagalpur (11,528), Baliaghati (5,610), Sankarpur (4,530), Bazegazipur (6,502), Gazipur (4.600), Mahesail (16,178) and Amuha (4,331).

=== Literacy ===
As per the 2011 census, the total number of literates in Suti II CD block was 125,111 (55.23% of the population over 6 years) out of which males numbered 68,664 (62.84% of the male population over 6 years) and females numbered 56,447 (49.98% of the female population over 6 years). The gender disparity (the difference between female and male literacy rates) was 10.46%.

See also – List of West Bengal districts ranked by literacy rate

Literacy in CD blocks of
Murshidabad district
Jangipur subdivision
Farakka – 59.75%
Samserganj – 54.98%
Suti I – 58.40%
Suti II – 55.23%
Raghunathganj I – 64.49%
Raghunathganj II – 61.17%
Sagardighi – 65.27%
Lalbag subdivision
Murshidabad-Jiaganj – 69.14%
Bhagawangola I - 57.22%
Bhagawangola II – 53.48%
Lalgola– 64.32%
Nabagram – 70.83%
Sadar subdivision
Berhampore – 73.51%
Beldanga I – 70.06%
Beldanga II – 67.86%
Hariharpara – 69.20%
Naoda – 66.09%
Kandi subdivision
Kandi – 65.13%
Khargram – 63.56%
Burwan – 68.96%
Bharatpur I – 62.93%
Bharatpur II – 66.07%
Domkol subdivision
Domkal – 55.89%
Raninagar I – 57.81%
Raninagar II – 54.81%
Jalangi – 58.73%
Source: 2011 Census: CD Block Wise
Primary Census Abstract Data

=== Language and religion ===
Religion in Suti II CD block (2011)
Islam	72.53%
Hinduism	27.22%
Other or not stated	0.25%

In the 2011 census, Muslims numbered 202,292 and formed 72.53% of the population in Suti II CD block. Hindus numbered 75,927 and formed 27.22% of the population. Others numbered 703 and formed 0.25% of the population. In Suti I and Suti II CD blocks taken together, while the proportion of Muslims increased from 60.93% in 1991 to 63.73% in 2001, the proportion of Hindus declined from 39.02% in 1991 to 36.07% in 2001.

Murshidabad district had 4,707,573 Muslims who formed 66.27% of the population, 2,359,061 Hindus who formed 33.21% of the population, and 37, 173 persons belonging to other religions who formed 0.52% of the population, in the 2011 census. While the proportion of Muslim population in the district increased from 61.40% in 1991 to 63.67% in 2001, the proportion of Hindu population declined from 38.39% in 1991 to 35.92% in 2001.

Murshidabad was the only Muslim majority district in West Bengal at the time of partition of India in 1947. The proportion of Muslims in the population of Murshidabad district in 1951 was 55.24%. The Radcliffe Line had placed Muslim majority Murshidabad in India and the Hindu majority Khulna in Pakistan, in order to maintain the integrity of the Ganges river system In India.

Bengali was the predominant language, spoken by 99.87% of the population as their first language.

== Rural poverty ==
As per the Human Development Report 2004 for West Bengal, the rural poverty ratio in Murshidabad district was 46.12%. Purulia, Bankura and Birbhum districts had higher rural poverty ratios. These estimates were based on Central Sample data of NSS 55th round 1999-2000.

== Economy ==
=== Livelihood ===
Livelihood
in Suti II CD block
1. Cultivators (3.41%)
2. Agricultural labourers (12.5%)
3. Household industries (62.9%)
4. Other Workers (21.2%)

In Suti II CD block in 2011, amongst the class of total workers, cultivators numbered 4,387 and formed 4,31%, agricultural labourers numbered 16,077 and formed 12.50%, household industry workers numbered 80,825 and formed 62.85% and other workers numbered 27,317 and formed 21.24%.

=== Infrastructure ===
There are 24 inhabited villages in Suti II CD block. 100% villages have power supply and in some places have drinking water supply. 8 villages (33.33%) have post offices. 22 villages (91.67%) have telephones (including landlines, public call offices and mobile phones). 15 villages (62.50%) have a pucca approach road and 8 villages (33.33%) have transport communication (includes bus service, rail facility and navigable waterways). 4 villages (16.67%) have agricultural credit societies and 5 villages (10.07%) have banks.

=== Agriculture ===
From 1977 onwards major land reforms took place in West Bengal. Land in excess of land ceiling was acquired and distributed amongst the peasants. Following land reforms land ownership pattern has undergone transformation. In 2013-14, persons engaged in agriculture in Suti II CD block could be classified as follows: bargadars 370 (1.23%,) patta (document) holders 4,188 (13.88%), small farmers (possessing land between 1 and 2 hectares) 1,785 (5.92%), marginal farmers (possessing land up to 1 hectare) 7,744 (25.68%) and agricultural labourers 16,077 (53,30%).

Suti II CD block had 29 fertiliser depots, 1 seed store and 47 fair price shops in 2013-14.

In 2013-14, Suti II CD block produced 1,564 tonnes of Aman paddy, the main winter crop from 617 hectares, 20 tonnes of Boro paddy (spring crop) from 6 hectares, 1,132 tonnes of Aus paddy (summer crop) from 826 hectares, 7,018 tonnes of wheat from 2,742 hectares, 65,418 tonnes of jute from 3,476 hectares and 11,700 tonnes of potatoes from 390 hectares. It also produced pulses and oilseeds.

In 2013-14, the total area irrigated in Suti II CD block was 3,349 hectares, out of which 510 hectares were irrigated with tank water, 24 hectares with river lift irrigation, 80 hectares with deep tube wells and 2,735 hectares by other means.

=== Beedi industry ===
As of 2003, around 400,000 workers were engaged in the prime area locations of beedi making, a household industry, in Farakka, Samserganj, Suti I, Suti II, Raghunathganj I and Raghunathganj II CD blocks. The majority of those working are women and children. Almost all households are engaged in this activity.

See also – Beedi Workers of Murshidabad (in Hindi). Lok Sabha TV feature

=== Silk and handicrafts ===
Murshidabad is famous for its silk industry since the Middle Ages. There are three distinct categories in this industry, namely (i) Mulberry cultivation and silkworm rearing (ii) Peeling of raw silk (iii) Weaving of silk fabrics.

Ivory carving is an important cottage industry from the era of the Nawabs. The main areas where this industry has flourished are Khagra and Jiaganj. 99% of ivory craft production is exported. In more recent years sandalwood etching has become more popular than ivory carving. Bell metal and Brass utensils are manufactured in large quantities at Khagra, Berhampore, Kandi and Jangipur.

=== Banking ===
In 2013-14, Suti II CD block had offices of 8 commercial banks and 2 gramin banks.

=== Backward Regions Grant Fund ===
Murshidabad district is listed as a backward region and receives financial support from the Backward Regions Grant Fund. The fund, created by the Government of India, is designed to redress regional imbalances in development. As of 2012, 272 districts across the country were listed under this scheme. The list includes 11 districts of West Bengal.

== Transport ==
Suti II CD block has 4 ferry services and 2 originating/ terminating bus routes.

The Barharwa-Azimganj-Katwa loop line passes through this block and there is a station at Sujnipara railway station.

National Highway 12 (old number NH 34) passes through this block.

== Education ==
In 2013-14, Suti II CD block had 86 primary schools with 23,332 students, 1 middle school with 307 students, 2 high schools with 2,373 students and 8 higher secondary schools with 24,114 students. Suti II CD block had 1 general college with 3,742 students, 3 technical/ professional institutions with 300 students, 405 institutions special and non-formal education with 24.008 students.

The Murshidabad Centre of Aligarh Muslim University was established at Village & PO Jangipur Barrage, PS Suti in 2010. It started classes for the 2-years Master of Business Administration (MBA) and the 5-years BA LLB programmes in 2011.It started B.Ed. in 2013.

Dukhulal Nibaran Chandra College was established in 1967 at Aurangabad. Affiliated with the University of Kalyani, it offers 13 courses of study.

In Suti II CD block, amongst the 24 inhabited villages, 1 villages did not have a school, 12 villages have more than 1 primary school, 7 villages have at least 1 primary and 1 middle school and 3 villages had at least 1 middle and 1 secondary school.

== Healthcare ==
In 2014, Suti II CD block had 1 block primary health centre, 2 primary health centres and 2 private nursing homes with total 31 beds and 6 doctors (excluding private bodies). It had 31 family welfare subcentres. 24,215 patients were treated indoor and 90,235 patients were treated outdoor in the hospitals, health centres and subcentres of the CD block.

Suti II CD block has Mahesail Rural Hospital at Parulia via Aurangabad (with 30 beds), Aurangabad Primary Health Centre at Dihigram (with 10 beds) and Baje Gajipur PHC at Kassimnagar (with 6 beds).

Suti II CD block is one of the areas of Murshidabad district where ground water is affected by a high level of arsenic contamination. The WHO guideline for arsenic in drinking water is 10 mg/ litre, and the Indian Standard value is 50 mg/ litre. All but one of the 26 blocks of Murshidabad district have arsenic contamination above the WHO level, all but two of the blocks have arsenic concentration above the Indian Standard value and 17 blocks have arsenic concentration above 300 mg/litre. The maximum concentration in Suti II CD block is 1,852 mg/litre.
