= Umrapur, West Bengal =

Village in West Bengal, India

Umrapur
- Village
- Location within West Bengal Location within India
- Coordinates: 24°35′11″N 87°53′17″E
- Country: India
- State: West Bengal
- District: Murshidabad
- Block: Suti II

Government
  - Type: Gram Panchayat

Area
  - Total: 13.11 km^{2} (5.06 sq mi)
- Elevation: 22 m (72 ft)

Population (2011)
  - Total: 19,855
  - Density: 1,514/km^{2} (3,923/sq mi)

Languages
  - Official: Bengali
  - Other: Hindi, English
- Time zone: UTC+5:30 (IST)
- PIN: 731222
- Telephone code: 03485
- Vehicle registration: WB-65

Umrapur is a village in Suti-II Block, Murshidabad District, West Bengal, India. It is located on the state border with Jharkhand, approximately 66 kilometres northwest of the district capital Berhampore, and 15 kilometres west of the block capital Aurangabad. In the year 2011, the village has a population of 19,855.

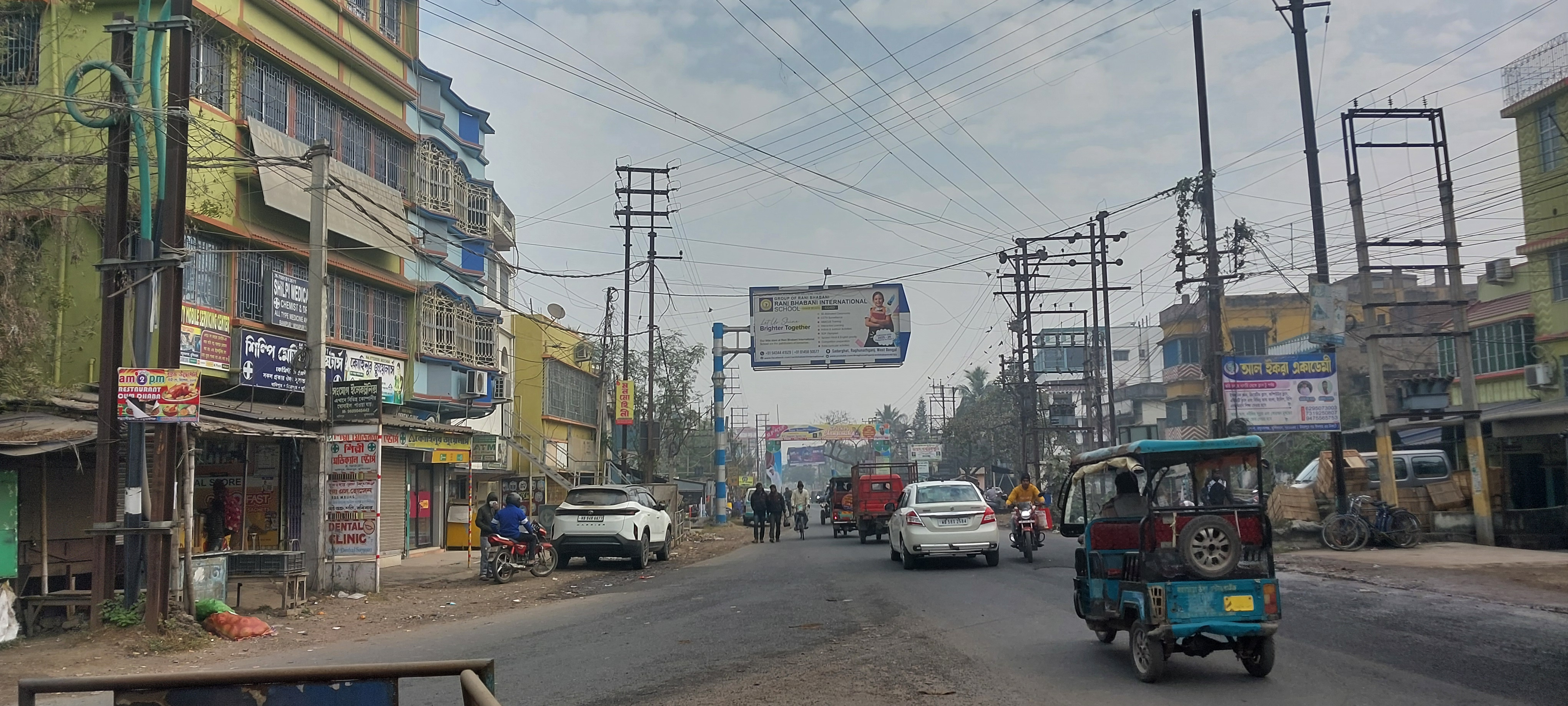
Umrapur bazar

== Geography ==
Umrapur is located on the south of Farakka Feeder Canal. It is bounded by Bahagalpur in the north, Amadaul in the east, Kadoa in the south, and Kismat Kadamsai in the west. Its average elevation is 22 metres above the sea level.

== Demographics ==
According to the 2011 Census of India, the village has a total of 3,500 households. Out of the 19,855 inhabitants, 9,936 are male and 9,919 are female. The overall literacy rate is 26.15%, with 2,833 of the male residents and 2,359 of the female residents being literate. The census location code is 313945.
