= Aurangabad, West Bengal =

Aurangabad
- Census town
- Location in West Bengal, India Aurangabad (India)
- Coordinates: 24.6012°N 88.0336°E
- Country: India
- State: West Bengal
- District: Murshidabad
- Named for: Emperor Aurangzeb

Government
  - Type: Federal democracy

Area
  - Total: 2.77 km^{2} (1.07 sq mi)

Population (2011)
  - Total: 39,261
  - Density: 14,200/km^{2} (36,700/sq mi)

Languages
  - Official: Bengali, English
- Time zone: UTC+5:30 (IST)
- PIN: 742201,742224
- Telephone/ STD code: +913485
- ISO 3166 code: IN-WB
- Vehicle registration: WB-57, WB-58, WB-94, WB-93
- Lok Sabha constituency: Jangipur
- Vidhan Sabha constituency: Suti
- Website: murshidabad.nic.in

Aurangabad is a census town in the Suti II CD block in the Jangipur subdivision of the Murshidabad district in the Indian state of West Bengal. The town lies between The Ganga and the feeder canal.

== Geography ==
Cities, towns and locations in the northern portion of Jangipur subdivision, Murshidabad district (including Farakka, Samserganj, Suti II CD blocks)
M: municipal town, CT: census town, R: rural/ urban centre, F: Facility
Abbreviation- TPS: Thermal Power Station
Owing to space constraints in the small map, the actual locations in a larger map may vary slightly

=== Location ===
Aurangabad is located at 24.6012°N 88.0336°E.

According to the map of Suti II CD block in the District Census Handbook, Murshidabad, Dafahat, Jagtaj, Debipur, Aurangabad, Hafania, Mahendrapur, Paschim Punropara, Bhabki, Khidirpur, Khanpur, Ichhlampur, Chakmeghoan and Kakramari, form a cluster of census towns.

=== Area overview ===
Jangipur subdivision is crowded with 52 census towns and as such it had to be presented in two location maps. One of the maps can be seen alongside. The subdivision is located in the Rarh region that is spread over from adjoining Santhal Pargana division of Jharkhand. The land is slightly higher in altitude than the surrounding plains and is gently undulating. The river Ganges, along with its distributaries, is prominent in both the maps. At the head of the subdivision is the 2,245 m long Farakka Barrage, one of the largest projects of its kind in the country. Murshidabad district shares with Bangladesh a porous international border which is notoriously crime prone (partly shown in this map). The subdivision has two large power plants - the 2,100 MW Farakka Super Thermal Power Station and the 1,600 MW Sagardighi Thermal Power Station. According to a 2016 report, there are around 1,000,000 (1 million/ ten lakh) workers engaged in the beedi industry in Jangipur subdivision. 90% are home-based and 70% of the home-based workers are women. As of 2013, an estimated 2.4 million people reside along the banks of the Ganges alone in Murshidabad district. Severe erosion occurs along the banks.

Note: The two maps present some of the notable locations in the subdivision. All places marked in the maps are linked in the larger full screen maps.

== History ==
Origin of the Name “Aurangabad”

The name Aurangabad is found in several states of India, including Bihar, Maharashtra, Uttar Pradesh and West Bengal. The widespread use of this name is generally linked to the Mughal emperor Aurangzeb, also known by his regal title Aurangzeb Alamgir. During the expansion of Mughal administration across northern and eastern India, newly organised settlements, military outposts and administrative centres were often named after members of the imperial family. As a result, several regions came to be known as Aurangabad, literally meaning “the city of Aurangzeb.”

In the case of West Bengal, local accounts suggest that Alamgir (Aurangzeb) may have travelled through or temporarily camped near this region during a royal journey or military movement. Although documentary evidence is limited, the tradition has persisted for generations. According to this popular belief, the area gained significance during the Mughal period, and the name Aurangabad became established as a marker of that historical association.

== Demographics ==
According to the 2021 Census of India, Aurangabad had a total population of approx 278,922 Rural Population: 110,767 Children (0-6 yrs): 52,382 (22,148 rural)Scheduled Castes: 20,461 (4,438 rural)Scheduled Tribes: 493 Aurangabad had a population of 32,134. Males constitute 50% of the population and females 50%. Aurangabad has an average literacy rate of 44%, lower than the national average of 59.5%: male literacy is 52%, and female literacy is 36%. In Aurangabad, 19% of the population is under 6 years of. Aurangabad also includes Mahendrapur village which has a population of 6979.

== Infrastructure ==
According to the District Census Handbook, Murshidabad, 2011, Aurangabad covered an area of 2.77 km^{2}. The protected water-supply involved overhead tank, tube well, borwell. It had 3099 domestic electric connections. Among the medical facilities it had 5 dispensaries/ health centres, 11 medicine shops. Among the educational facilities, it had 18 primary schools, 1 middle school, 2 secondary schools, 2 senior secondary schools, 1 general degree college. It had 1 recognised shorthand, typewriting, vocational training institution. Among the social cultural and recreational facilities it had 1 stadium, 1 auditorium/ community hall. It produced beedi, spices, handloom. It had branches of 2 nationalised banks, 1 private commercial bank.

== Education ==
College

Dukhulal Nibaran Chandra College of Aurangabad is recognized by UGC.

Schools

Aurangabad High School (H. S) of Aurangabad is maintained by the 'National University of Educational Planning and Administration' under the program 'District Information System for Education 2013–2014.

Aurangabad Balika Vidyalaya

Chhabghati K.D. Vidyalaya (H.S.)

English Oriental Academy, CBSE Board

Aurangabad High Madrasah (H.S)

Ideal Education Mission School

Nimtita G. D Institution

Panchagram I. S. A High School

Aurangabad PTTI

Aurangabad Public School

Altab Hossain PTTI

As Sabin Mission

ARTM Public School

Prabananda Vidyapith

Gurukul Sikhsha Niketan

Aurangabad Public School

Other institutions

Jakir Hossain Institute of Polytechnic

Aurangabad B.Ed. College

Nathulal Das B.Ed. College

Am Teacher's Training college

Aurangabad B.Ed. Training College

J.S B.Ed. College

Aurangabad (West Bengal) as a Beedi and Homecraft Industries Hub

Aurangabad, located in Murshidabad district of West Bengal, is widely recognised as a major hub of beedi and home-based craft industries. The region hosts a large number of small and medium-scale manufacturers, providing employment to thousands of local workers.

Among the industrial establishments in the area, Pataka Industry Private Limited is considered one of the largest and most prominent. Alongside it, several well-known beedi brands operate from Aurangabad, including Kalpana Biri, Shiv Bidi, Howrah Bidi, and Mrinalini Bidi. These industries play a significant role in the local economy and have contributed to Aurangabad’s reputation as a centre of traditional home-craft production.

The beedi sector in Aurangabad supports a wide network of workers, particularly women, who are engaged in rolling, processing, and packaging. As a result, the region is regarded as an important source of livelihood for many families and is often described as a homecraft industries hub of national significance.

== Healthcare ==
Aurangabad has a Primary Health Centre (PHC).

Suti II CD block is one of the areas of Murshidabad district where ground water is affected by a high level of arsenic contamination. The WHO guideline for arsenic in drinking water is 10 mg/ litre, and the Indian Standard value is 50 mg/ litre. The maximum concentration in Suti II CD block is 1,852 mg/litre.

== Electoral constituencies ==
Aurangabad was assembly constituency No. 51 of West Bengal; later as recommendations of Delimitation Commission were implemented,& demolished the Aurangabad assembly constituency now this area was part of new assembly constituency No. 57, Suti, which will contain the whole area under Suti I and Suti II CD Blocks.

Chairpersons: The following individuals have served as Chairpersons of the Aurangabad local administrative body:

Abu Taher Ali – Block President/Chairman (1993–1998)Indian National Congress.

Hossain Ali – Chairman (subsequent term) Communist party of India.

Alfajuddin Biswas – Chairman (subsequent term) INC.
