= Farakka Barrage Township =

- Census Town
- Location in West Bengal, India Farakka Barrage Township (India)
- Coordinates: 24.819°N 87.911°E
- Country: India
- State: West Bengal
- District: Murshidabad

Area
  - Total: 3.7 km^{2} (1.4 sq mi)
- Elevation: 12 m (39 ft)

Population (2011)
  - Total: 20,126
  - Density: 5,400/km^{2} (14,000/sq mi)

Languages
  - Official: Bengali, English
- Time zone: UTC+5:30 (IST)
- PIN: 742212
- Vehicle registration: WB
- Lok Sabha constituency: Maldaha Dakshin
- Vidhan Sabha constituency: Farakka
- Website: murshidabad.nic.in

Farrakka Barrage Township is a census town in the Farakka CD block in the Jangipur subdivision of the Murshidabad district in the state of West Bengal, India.

== Geography ==
Cities, towns and locations in the northern portion of Jangipur subdivision, Murshidabad district (including Farakka, Samserganj, Suti II CD blocks)
M: municipal town, CT: census town, R: rural/ urban centre, F: Facility
Abbreviation- TPS: Thermal Power Station
Owing to space constraints in the small map, the actual locations in a larger map may vary slightly

=== Location ===
Farakka Barrage Township is located at 24.819°N 87.911°E. It has an average elevation of 12 metres (39 feet).

=== Area overview ===
Jangipur subdivision is crowded with 52 census towns and as such it had to be presented in two location maps. One of the maps can be seen alongside. The subdivision is located in the Rarh region that is spread over from adjoining Santhal Pargana division of Jharkhand. The land is slightly higher in altitude than the surrounding plains and is gently undulating. The river Ganges, along with its distributaries, is prominent in both the maps. At the head of the subdivision is the 2,245 m long Farakka Barrage, one of the largest projects of its kind in the country. Murshidabad district shares with Bangladesh a porous international border which is notoriously crime prone (partly shown in this map). The subdivision has two large power plants - the 2,100 MW Farakka Super Thermal Power Station and the 1,600 MW Sagardighi Thermal Power Station. According to a 2016 report, there are around 1 million workers engaged in the beedi industry in Jangipur subdivision. 90% are home-based and 70% of the home-based workers are women. As of 2013, an estimated 2.4 million people reside along the banks of the Ganges alone in Murshidabad district. Severe erosion occurs along the banks.

Note: The two maps present some of the notable locations in the subdivision. All places marked in the maps are linked in the larger full screen maps.

== Demographics ==
According to the 2011 Census of India, Farakka Barrage Township had a population of 20,126, of which 10,430 (52%) were males and 9,696 (48%) females. Population in the age range 0–6 years was 1,882. The total number of literate persons in Farakka Barrage Township was 14,934 (78.90% of the population over 6 years).

As of 2001 India census, Farrakka Barrage Township had a population of 21,794. Males constitute 52% of the population and females 48%. Farrakka Barrage Township has an average literacy rate of 68%, higher than the national average of 59.5%: male literacy is 73%, and female literacy is 63%. In Farrakka Barrage Township, 13% of the population is under 6 years of age.

== Infrastructure ==
According to the District Census Handbook, Murshidabad, 2011, Farakka Barrage Township covered an area of 3.7 km^{2} (1.4 sq mi). It had 70.3 km (43.7 mi) roads with both open and closed drains. The protected water-supply involved overhead tank, uncovered well, hand pump. It had 3,674 domestic electric connections, 1,211 road lighting points. Among the medical facilities it had 2 hospitals, 1 dispensary/ health centre, 1 family welfare centre, 1 maternity & child welfare centre, 28 medicine shops. Among the educational facilities, it had 6 primary schools, 2 middle schools, 1 secondary school, 1 higher secondary school, 1 general degree college. Among the social, cultural & recreational facilities, it had 1 stadium, 1 cinema theatre, 1 auditorium/ community hall, 1 public library, 1 reading room. Important commodities it produced were electricity, cement. It had the branch offices of 8 nationalised banks, 1 cooperative bank, 1 non-agricultural credit society.

== Economy ==
The Farakka Barrage Project under the Indian Ministry of Water Resources is an important local project.

Farakka Super Thermal Power Station of NTPC Limited (formerly National Thermal Power Corporation) has of 2,100 MW capacity is located at Farakka. The NTPC-Farakka has 85 km long Merry Go Round Railway transporting coal from Rajmahal mines. Ambuja cement open its third project in Bengal in Farakka with a 1.5 million tonne capacity.

== Healthcare ==
Farakka Barrage Hospital functions with 50 beds.

== Transport ==
National Highway 34 meets National Highway 12 at Farakka.

A rail track, New Farakka Junction, connected Howrah, Sealdah and far southern and western parts of India, Assam via New Jalpaiguri in east and New Delhi via Kiul Jn.

From New Farakka Jn railway station and New Farakka Bus Stoppege (NH 34) Farakka Barrage Township(3 km) is connected by Rikshaw, battery operated Rikshaw and private car on rent.

The transport is also facilitated by routine bus service from Township TTS to PTS (falling under NTPC) and vice versa at stipulated timings every day. The township is served by New Farakka Junction.

== Tourism ==
Farakka Barrage Township is situated on the bank of the holy river Ganga. It surrounded by water channels and canal. Deer are nurtured in a park on the bank of the Ganga. The project is covered by much greenery and has a full, fresh airy atmosphere to live a peaceful and healthy life. At the end of October various types of migratory birds come here and stay up to February. The Hindu Milan Mandir operated by Bhrat Sevashram Sangha provides well accommodation system to visitors very near to the river Ganga.
