= Farakka =

Farakka Farruckabad
- Town
- Location in West Bengal, India Farakka (India)
- Coordinates: 24.7875°N 87.904167°E
- Country: India
- State: West Bengal
- District: Murshidabad

Government
  - Administrative Division: Malda

Languages
  - Official: Bengali, English
- Time zone: UTC+5:30 (IST)
- PIN: 742212 (Farakka)
- Lok Sabha constituency: Maldaha Dakshin
- Vidhan Sabha constituency: Farakka
- Website: murshidabad.gov.in

Farakka is a town, with a police station and a post office, not identified in 2011 census as a separate place, in the Farakka community development block in the Jangipur subdivision of Murshidabad district in the state of West Bengal, India. It is also known as the northernmost point of Ganga Delta.

== Geography ==
Cities, towns and locations in the northern portion of Jangipur subdivision, Murshidabad district (including Farakka, Samserganj, Suti II CD blocks)
M: municipal town, CT: census town, R: rural/ urban centre, F: Facility
Abbreviation- TPS: Thermal Power Station
Owing to space constraints in the small map, the actual locations in a larger map may vary slightly

=== Location ===
Farakka is located at 24.7875°N 87.904167°E.

=== Neighbourhoods ===
There are several places around Farakka, such as Farakka Barrage Township, Nabarun, Beniagram, Srimantapur, Puran Chandipur and Sahebnagar, which are in effect neighbourhoods of Farakka, but either identified as separate Census Towns/ villages or not identified separately in 2011 census.

=== Area overview ===
Jangipur subdivision is crowded with 52 census towns and as such it had to be presented in two location maps. One of the maps can be seen alongside. The subdivision is located in the Rarh region that is spread over from adjoining Santhal Pargana division of Jharkhand. The land is slightly higher in altitude than the surrounding plains and is gently undulating. The river Ganges, along with its distributaries, is prominent in both the maps. At the head of the subdivision is the 2,245 m long Farakka Barrage, one of the largest projects of its kind in the country. Murshidabad district shares with Bangladesh a porous international border which is notoriously crime prone (partly shown in this map). The subdivision has two large power plants - the 2,100 MW Farakka Super Thermal Power Station and the 1,600 MW Sagardighi Thermal Power Station. According to a 2016 report, there are around 1,000,000 (1 million/ ten lakh) workers engaged in the beedi industry in Jangipur subdivision. 90% are home-based and 70% of the home-based workers are women. As of 2013, an estimated 2.4 million people reside along the banks of the Ganges alone in Murshidabad district. Severe erosion occurs along the banks.

Note: The two maps present some of the notable locations in the subdivision. All places marked in the maps are linked in the larger full screen maps.

== Civic administration ==
=== Police station ===
Farakka police station has jurisdiction over the Farakka CD block.

=== CD block HQ ===
The headquarters of Farakka CD block are located at Farakka.

== Economy ==
Construction of the Farakka Barrage commenced in 1961 and it was commissioned in 1975.

The 2,100 MW Farakka Super Thermal Power Station of NTPC at Nabarun was commissioned between 1986 and 2011.

Farakka Port is a minor river port that handles coal imported for Farakka Super Thermal Power Station.

== Transport ==
New Farakka Junction railway station is on the Howrah-New Jalpaiguri line.

National Highway 12 (old number NH 34) passes through Farakka.

== Education ==
Prof. Sayed Nurul Hasan College was established in 1994 at Farakka. It is named after Saiyid Nurul Hasan, historian and former governor of West Bengal. Affiliated with the University of Kalyani, it offers honours courses in Bengali, English, Arabic, history, political science, sociology, education, economics and geography.

There is Farakka Barrage Project Higher Secondary School namely FBPHS School, the oldest central govt. Co-educational Bengali Medium School, established in the year 1965, affiliated by West Bengal Board of Secondary Education provide class I to XII education, governed by Farakka Barrage Project authority, Ministry of Jal Shakti, Govt of India.

There is Delhi Public School which run under the aegis of The Delhi Public School Society, New Delhi Co-educational English Medium CBSE School. It was established in the year 1993 and provide Secondary and Higher Secondary Education.

There is Holy Family School which run under the aegis of the HFS sisters. It is an English medium CISCE school. It was established in the year 1997 and provides secondary as well as Higher Secondary Education . It is located near the Beniagram hospital.

There is a branch of Kendriya Vidyalaya, operating under CBSE Board.

== Healthcare ==
The following medical facilities are located in and around Farakka: Farakka Barrage Hospital at Farakka Barrage Township (with 50 beds), Farakka Block Primary Health Centre at Farakka (with 10 beds), Beniagram Primary Health Centre (working as BPHC) (with 15 beds), Arjunpur PHC (with 10 beds) and Kendua PHC at Srimantapur (with 2 beds).
