= Farakka Long March =

Protest for the destruction of the Farakka Barrage in India

- Part of the Anti-Indian hegemony movement in Bangladesh
- Date: May 1976
- Location: Bangladesh
- Caused by: Demolition of the Farakka Barrage constructed by India; Demanding a rightful distribution of the Ganges's water.
- Methods: Civil resistance, demonstrations

The Farakka Long March occurred in May 1976, and was led by Maulana Abdul Hamid Khan Bhashani, demanding demolition of the Farakka Barrage constructed by India to divert flow of Ganges waters inside its territory, triggering the drying up of river Padma and desertification of Bangladesh. It was the first popular movement against India demanding a distribution of the Ganges's water in Bangladesh. Since then, historic Farakka Long March Day is observed on 16 May every year in Bangladesh.
