= Farakka Feeder Canal =

Canal in Murshidabad, West Bengal, India

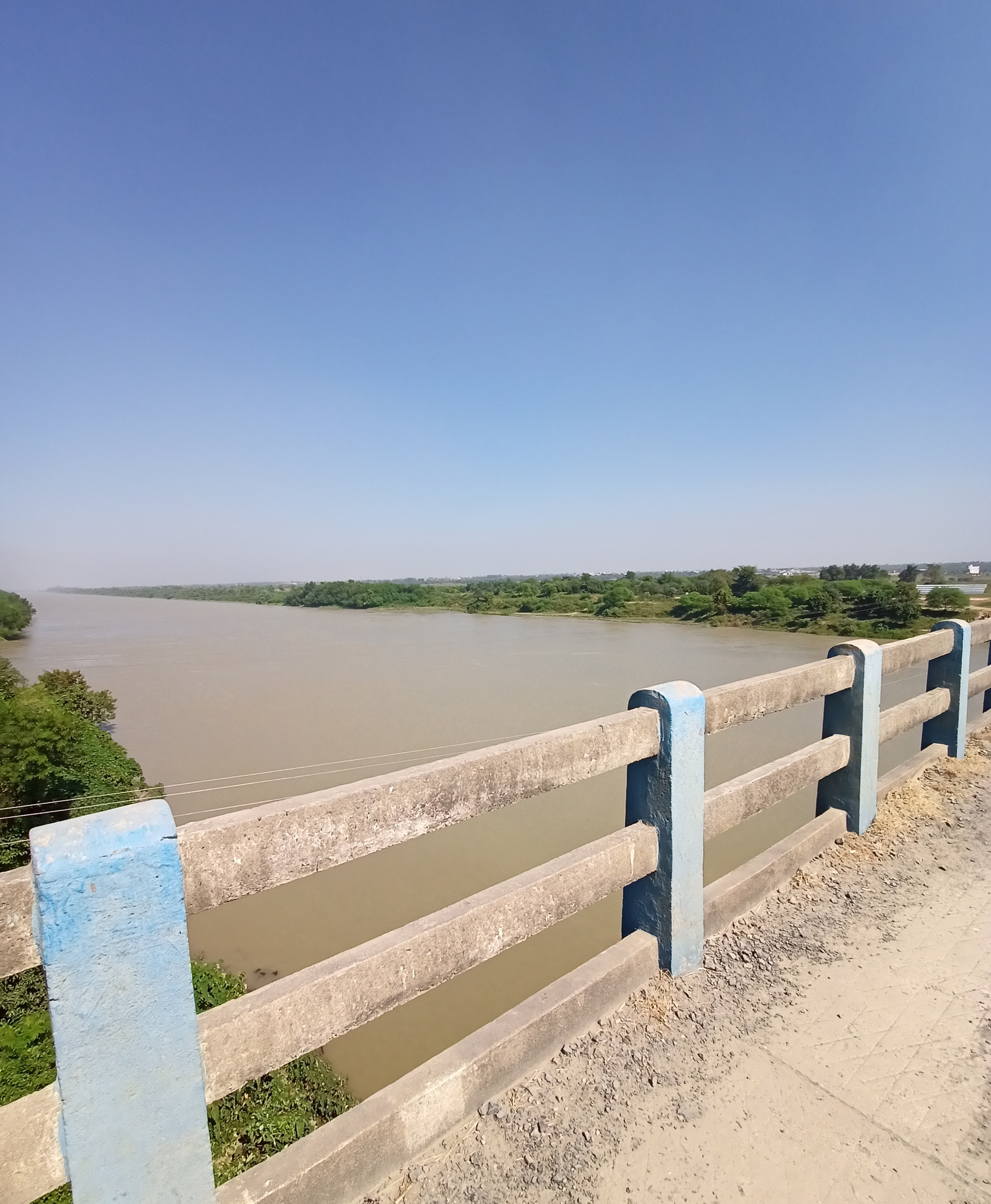

Feeder Canal is a canal associated with Farakka Barrage. It is located in Murshidabad district, West Bengal. The canal is 38.3 km (26 miles) long. The Ganges water from the Farakka Dam is being conveyed to Bhagirathi by way of this canal. Due to the flow of river Hooghly through the Farakka dam project, around 40,000 ft^{3}/s of water is available daily in the Feeder connection. The Feeder canal has been designed keeping in mind the ability to carry this amount of water. However, during the dry season, less water is released. The dry season is from January to May. During the period the flow of water in the feeder canal is reduced from ca. 40,000 ft^{3}/s to 30,000-28,000 ft^{3}/s. If the severe drought brings down the Ganges water from its upper reaches, then less water is available in feeder canal.

The 38.38 km long feeder canal takes off upstream of the Farakka Barrage and links with the Bhagirathi River. The feeder canal was constructed across the flow of the small flashy rivers such as Gumani, Trimohini and Kanloi. The discharges of the Trimohini and Kanloi were designed to flow into the feeder canal, and whenever the discharges of these rivers exceed the design capacity, they cause problems. The discharge of the Masna was designed to flow into the Ganga along its course through a siphon across the feeder canal. With the choking of the outlet to the Ganges, the flood discharge spills over to the basins of the Pagla and the Bansloi and floods around 100 km^{2}.

== Farakka water sharing treaty ==
As per the treaty between India and Bangladesh, signed in 1996, for sharing of the Ganges water at Farakka, the division is as follows:

| Availability at Farakka | Share of India | Share of Bangladesh |
|---|---|---|
| 70,000 ft^{3}/s or less | 50% | 50% |
| 70,000 – 75,000 ft^{3}/s | Balance of the flow | 35,000 ft^{3}/s |
| 75,000 ft^{3}/s or more | 40,000 ft^{3}/s | Balance of the flow |
