= Sagardighi Thermal Power Station =

Power station in West Bengal, India

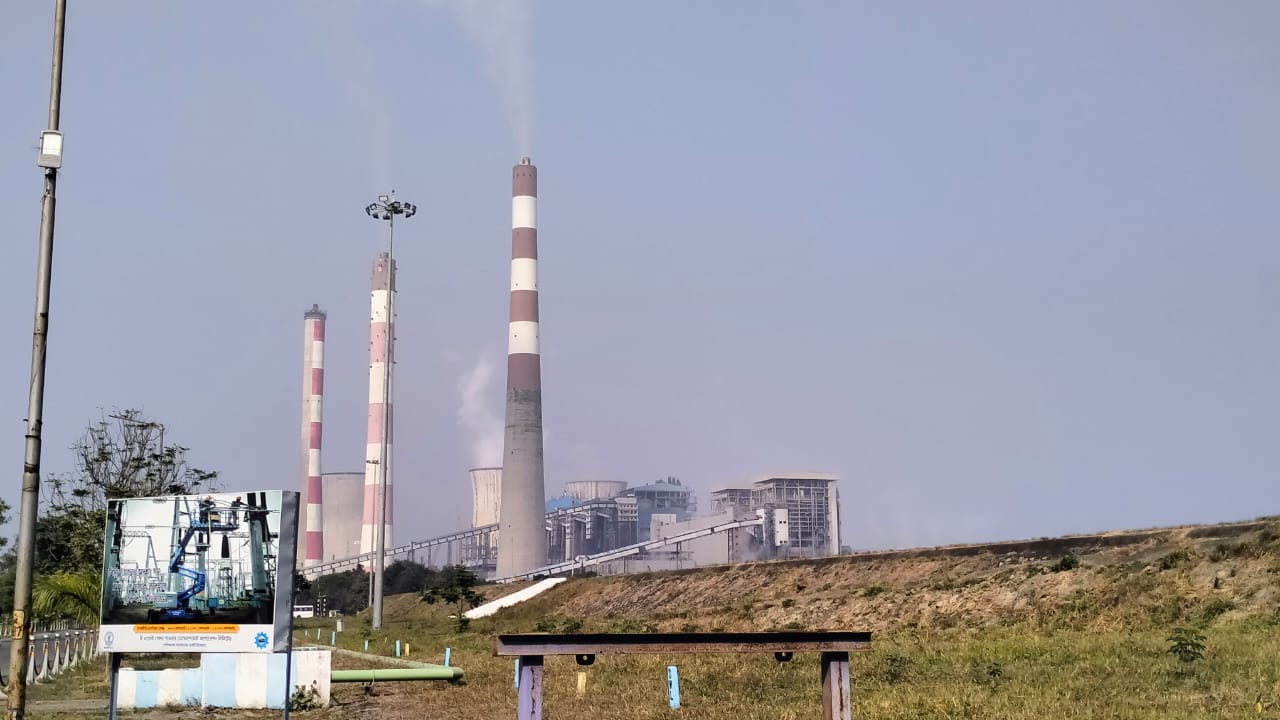
- Location of the Sagardighi Thermal Power Station in West Bengal
- Official name: WBPDCL
- Country: India
- Location: Sagardighi, West Bengal
- Coordinates: 24°22′06″N 88°06′04″E
- Status: Operational
- Commission date: Unit 1: 7 September 2008; Unit 2: 6 November 2008; Unit 3: December 2015; Unit 4: January 2017; Unit 5: June 2025
- Operator: West Bengal Power Development Corporation Limited

Thermal power station
- Primary fuel: Bituminous coal
- Tertiary fuel: Oil

Power generation
- Units operational: 2X300 MW; 2x500 MW; 1x660 MW
- Nameplate capacity: 2260 MW

External links
- Commons: Related media on Commons

Sagardighi Thermal Power Station is a thermal power plant located in Manigram, 13 km north of Sagardighi in West Bengal, India. It is operated by the West Bengal Power Development Corporation Limited.

== Geography ==
=== Location ===
The site is about 1 kilometre (0.62 mi) from Manigram railway station of the Bandel-Barhawara section of Eastern Railway. It is on the western bank of the Bhagirathi.

== History ==
The foundation of the Sagardighi Thermal Power Plant was laid by former Chief Minister of West Bengal Buddhadeb Bhattacharya in 2008.

The first two units of 300 MW each were synchronized to the electrical grid on 21.12.2007 and 13.08.2008. The second two units of 500 MW each were synchronized on 31.03.2015 and 15.10.2015. A solar power plant is planned for the same location. The plant provides power to Sagardighi, Subhasgram, Farakka, Baharampur, Gokarna, and Jeerat.

The project was developed by Dongfang Electric Corporation, at a cost of Rs. 27.50 billion. Total power generation is currently 1600 MW. Another 660 MW is planned for which the contract has been awarded to BHEL at a cost of around Rs. 3500

== Operation ==
Coal is provided by Captive Coal, Pachawar North and East of Damagaria Coal Mines. Raw water is primarily obtained from the Bhagirathi River and fed into a raw water pond inside the plant.

The power plant was awarded 5th best power generating plant in India by the Central Electricity Authority in 2022-2023.

== Gallery ==
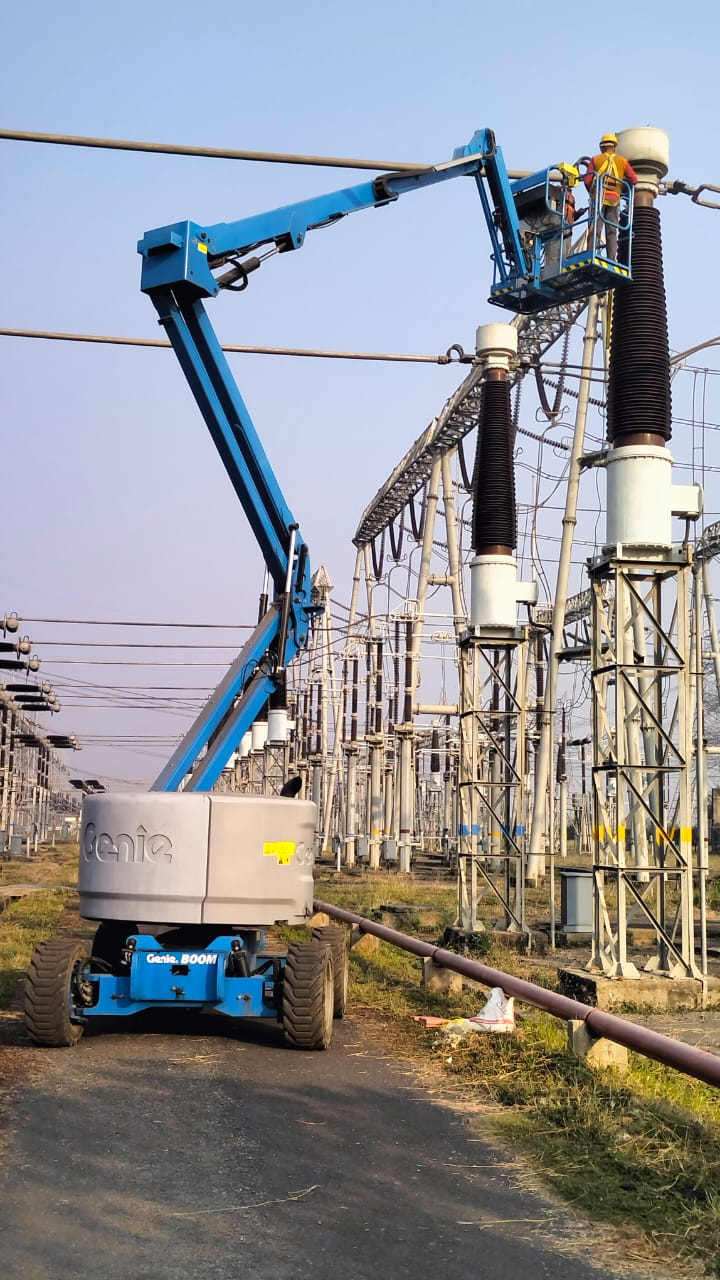

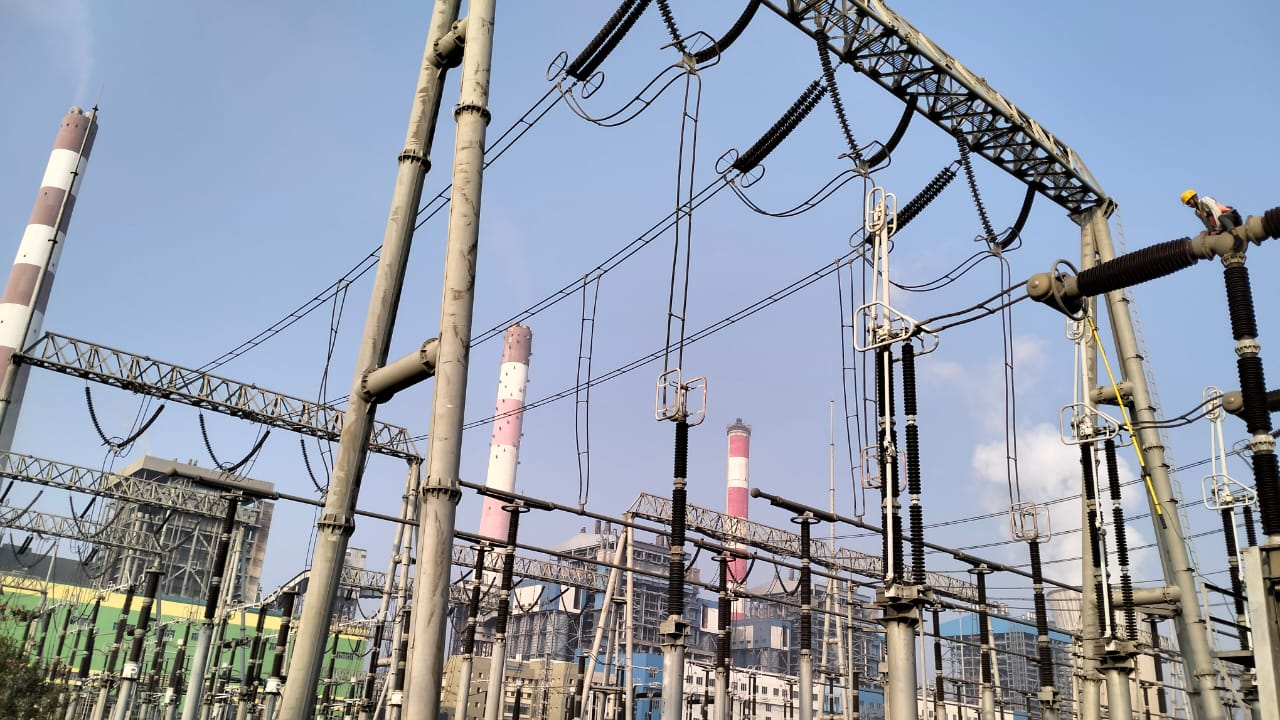

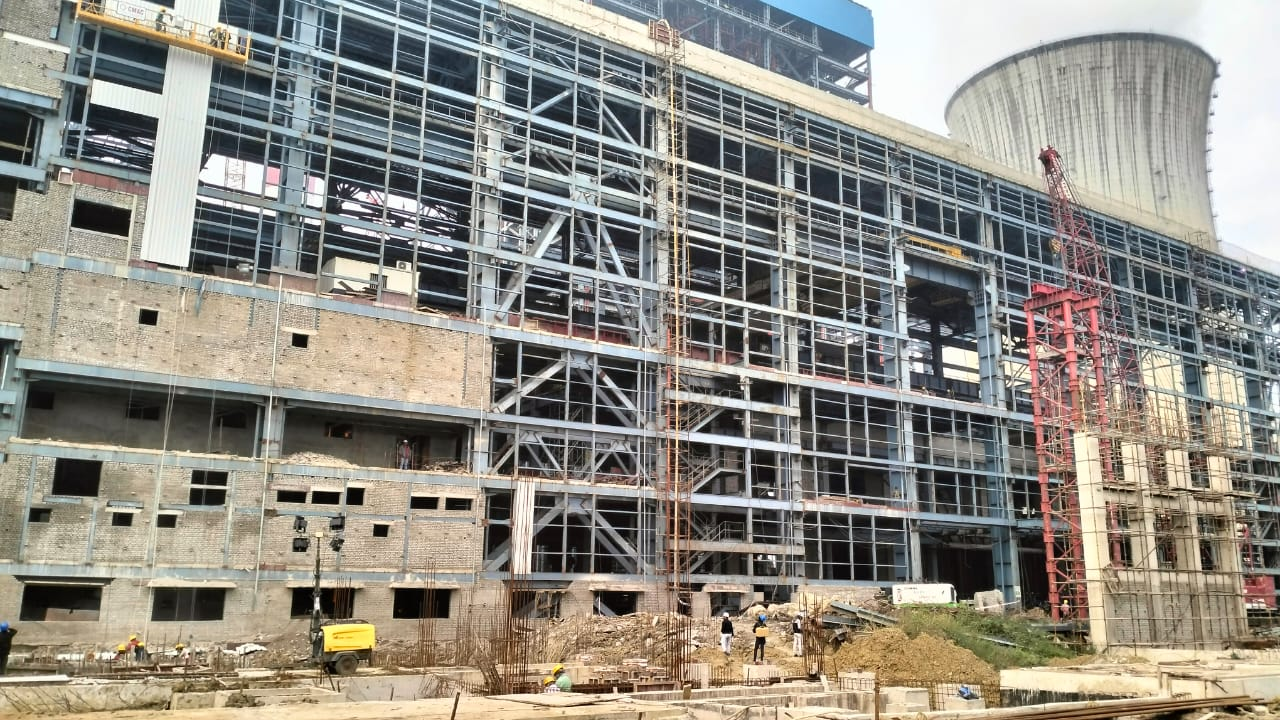

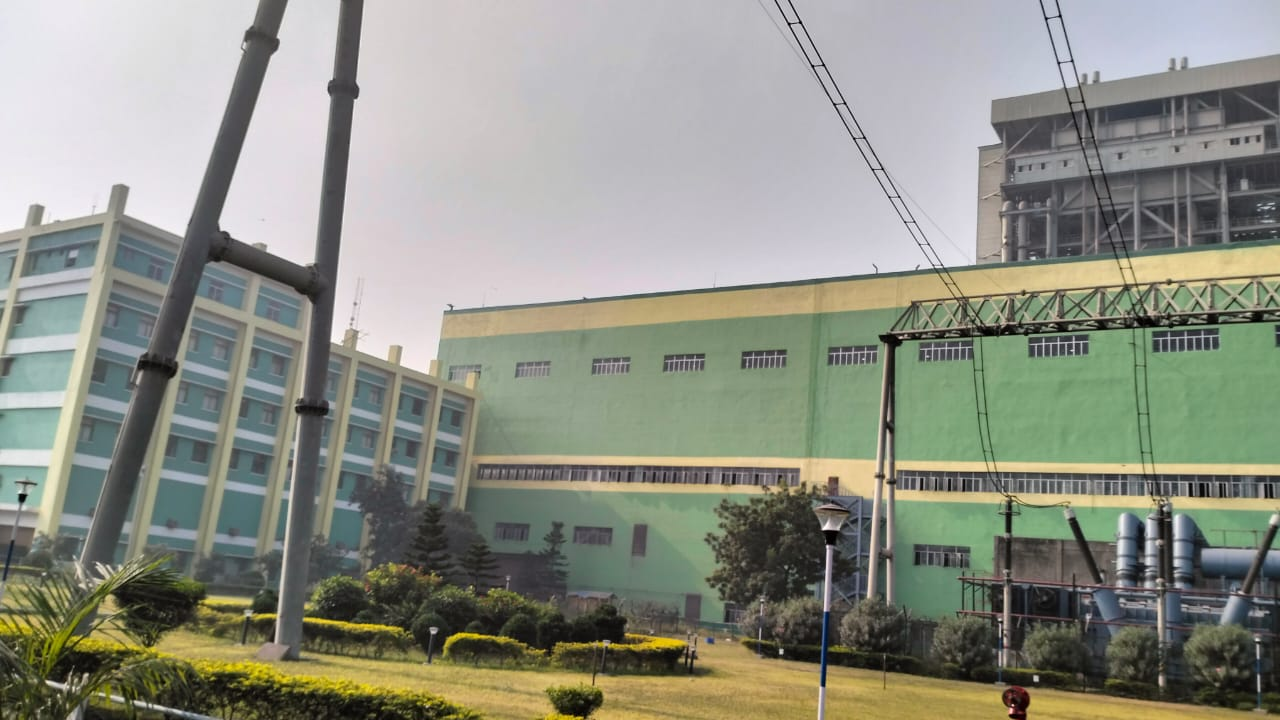

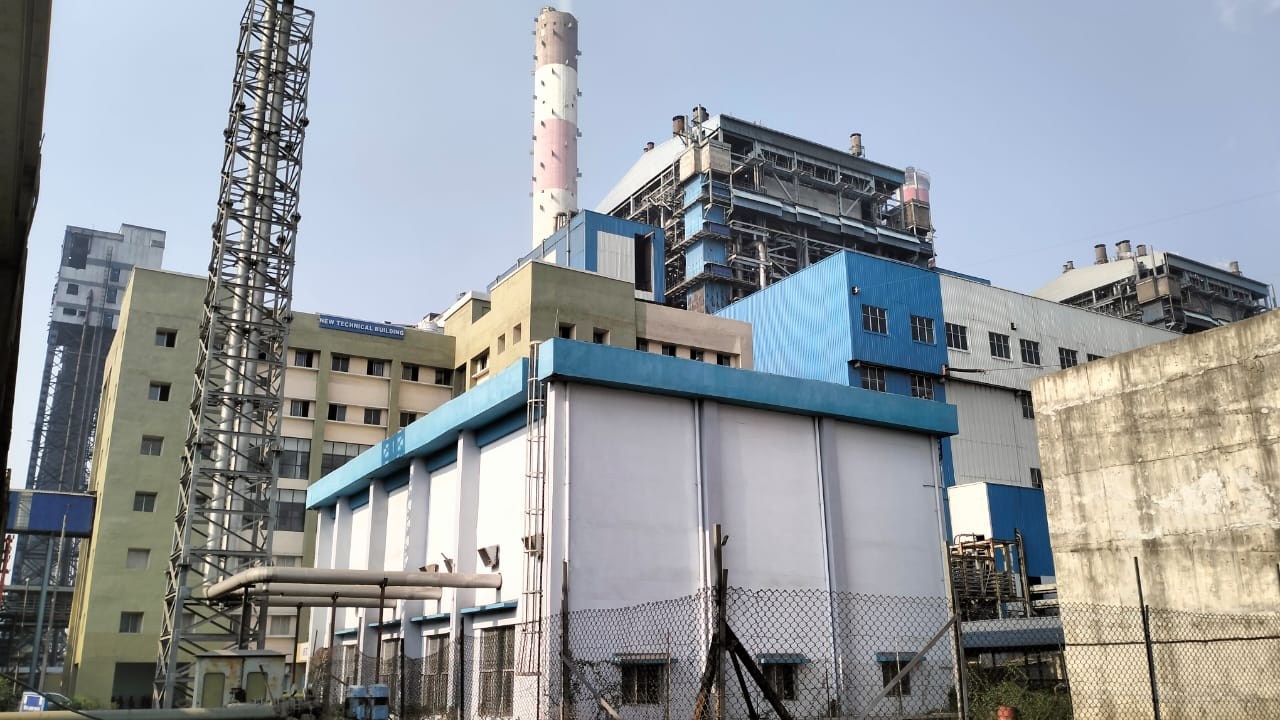

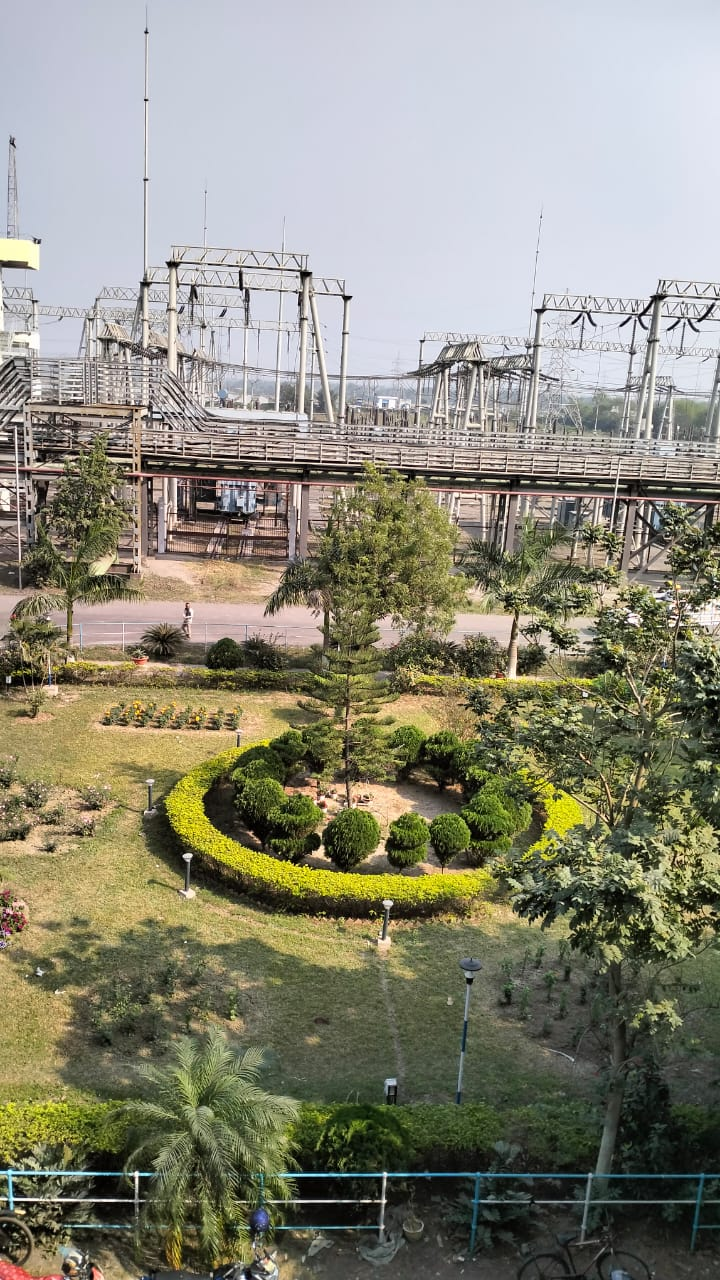

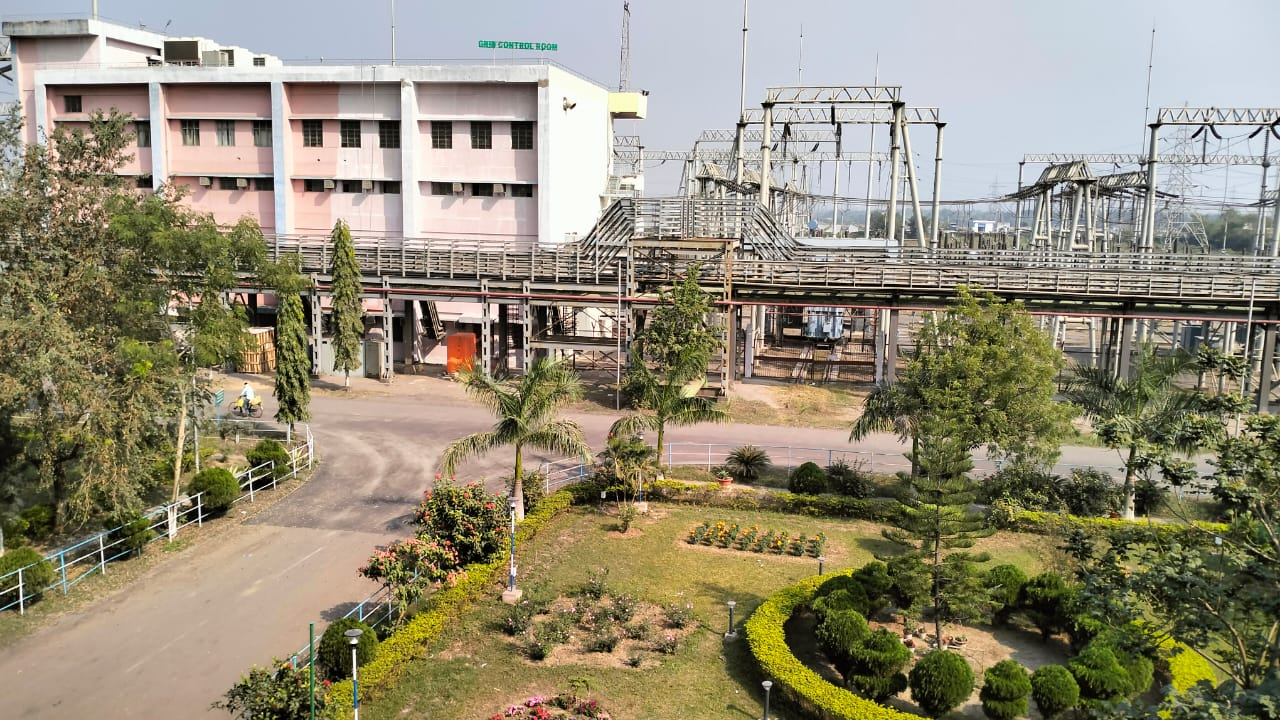

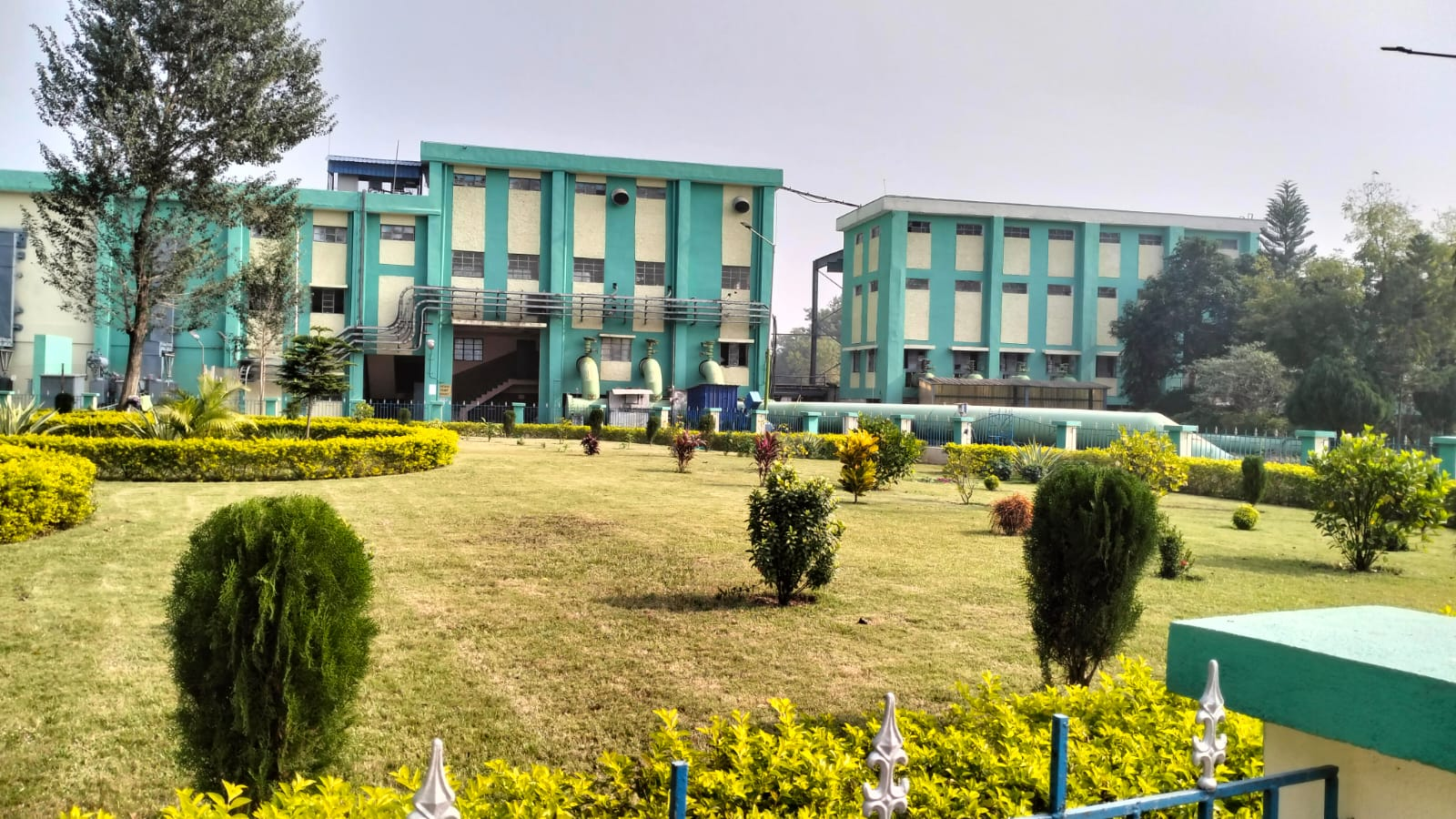

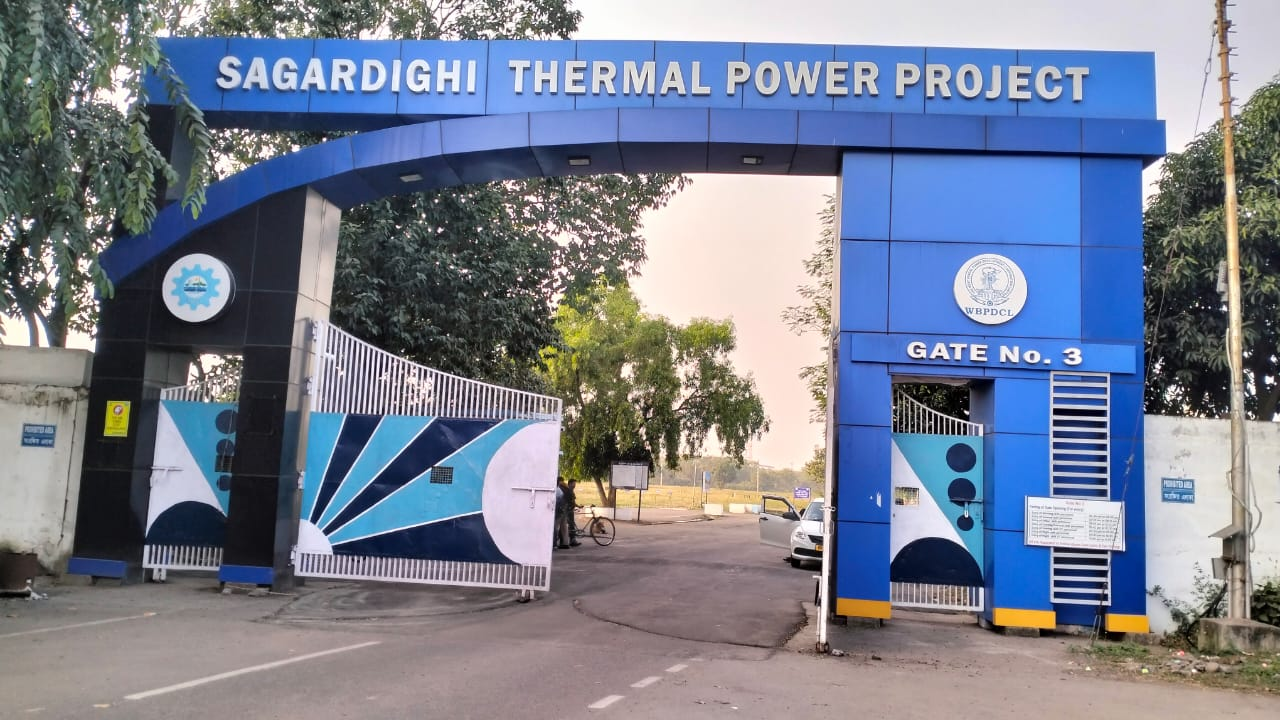

== Capacity ==
The station has a planned capacity of 1600 MW: 2 units of 300 MW each and 2 units of 500 MW each.

Unit number	Installed capacity (MW)	Date of commissioning	Status
1	300	2008 September	Commissioned
2	300	2008 November	Commissioned
3	500	2015 December	Commissioned
4	500	2017 January	Commissioned
5	660	2025 June	Commissioned [https://timesofindia.indiatimes.com/city/kolkata/sagardighi-supercritical-thermal-power-unit-to-start-ops-from-dec-10/articleshow/125774756.cms]
