= Farakka Super Thermal Power Station =

Coal-fired power station in West Bengal, India

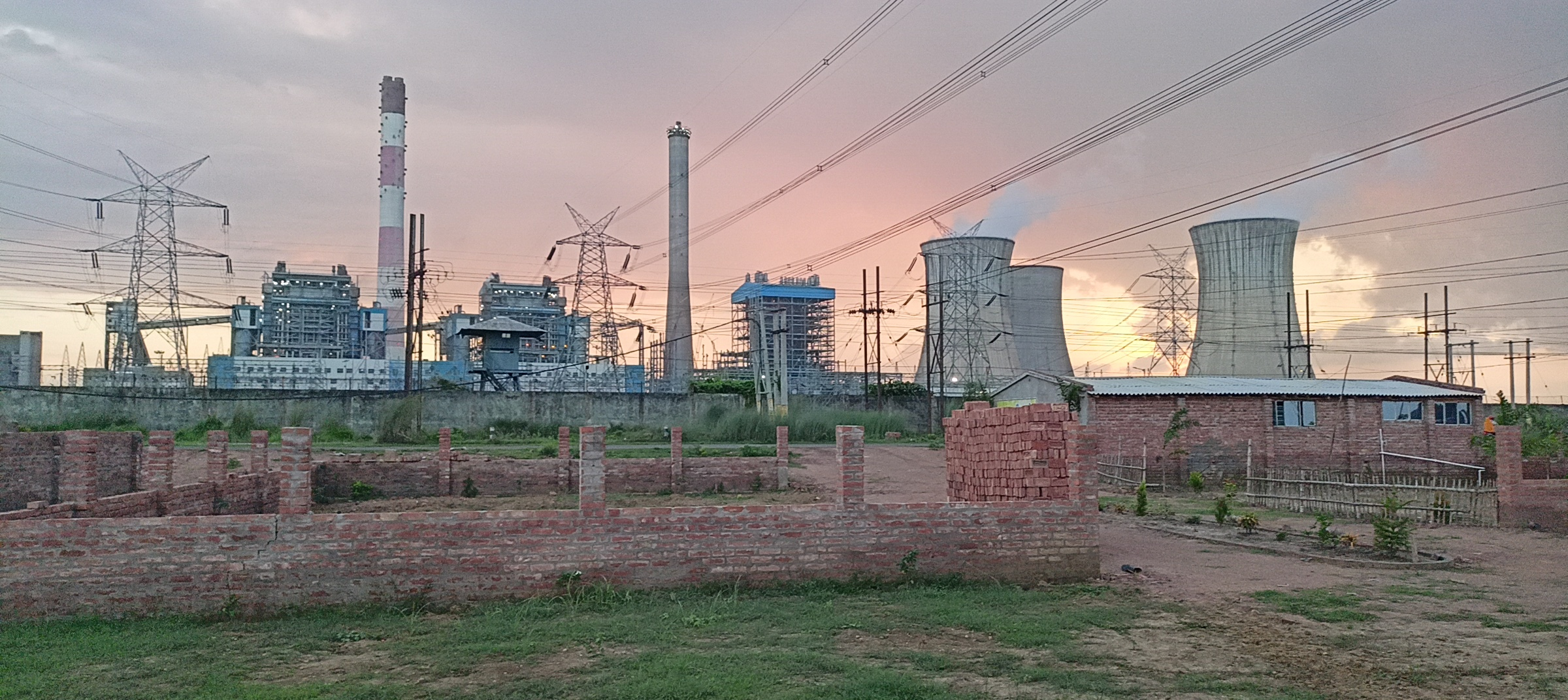
- Country: India
- Location: Nabarun, Murshidabad, West Bengal
- Coordinates: 24°46′21″N 87°53′39″E
- Status: Operational
- Commission date: 1986
- Owner: National Thermal Power Corporation

Thermal power station
- Primary fuel: Coal

Power generation
- Units operational: 6
- Nameplate capacity: 2,100 MW

External links
- Website: www.ntpc.co.in/power-generation/coal-based-power-stations/farakka

Farakka Super Thermal Power Plant is located at Nabarun in Murshidabad district in the Indian state of West Bengal. It is one of the coal-based power plants of NTPC.

== Geography ==
Cities, towns and locations in the northern portion of Jangipur subdivision, Murshidabad district (including Farakka, Samserganj, Suti II CD blocks)
M: municipal town, CT: census town, R: rural/urban centre, F: facility, TPS: thermal power station
Owing to space constraints in the small map, the actual locations in a larger map may vary slightly.

=== Location ===
Farakka Super Thermal Power Plant is located at 24°46′21″N 87°53′39″E.

Note: The map alongside presents some of the notable locations in a part of the subdivision. All places marked in the map are linked in the larger full screen map.

== Capacity ==
The unit wise capacity and other details are as follows.

Stage	Unit number	Installed capacity (MW)	Date of commissioning
First	1	200	January, 1986
First	2	200	December, 1986
First	3	200	August, 1987
Second	4	500	September, 1992
Second	5	500	February, 1994
Third	6	500	April, 2012
Total	Six	2100	

== Coal link ==
A major coal mining project of Eastern Coalfields Limited (Rajmahal open cast project, a part of Rajmahal coalfield) is going on in Boarijore, Mahagama and Sunderpahari CD blocks of Godda district in Jharkhand. Rajmahal open cast project (earlier known as Lalmatia Colliery) supplies coal to the Farakka Super Thermal Power Station and the 2,340 MW Kahalgaon Super Thermal Power Station. Coal import from Indonesia for Farakka Super Thermal Power Plant by Farakka Port and National Waterway 1 .Jindal ITF Limited coal carry by barge from Haldia Port to Farakka.

== See also ==
- List of power stations in West Bengal
