= Farakka Barrage =

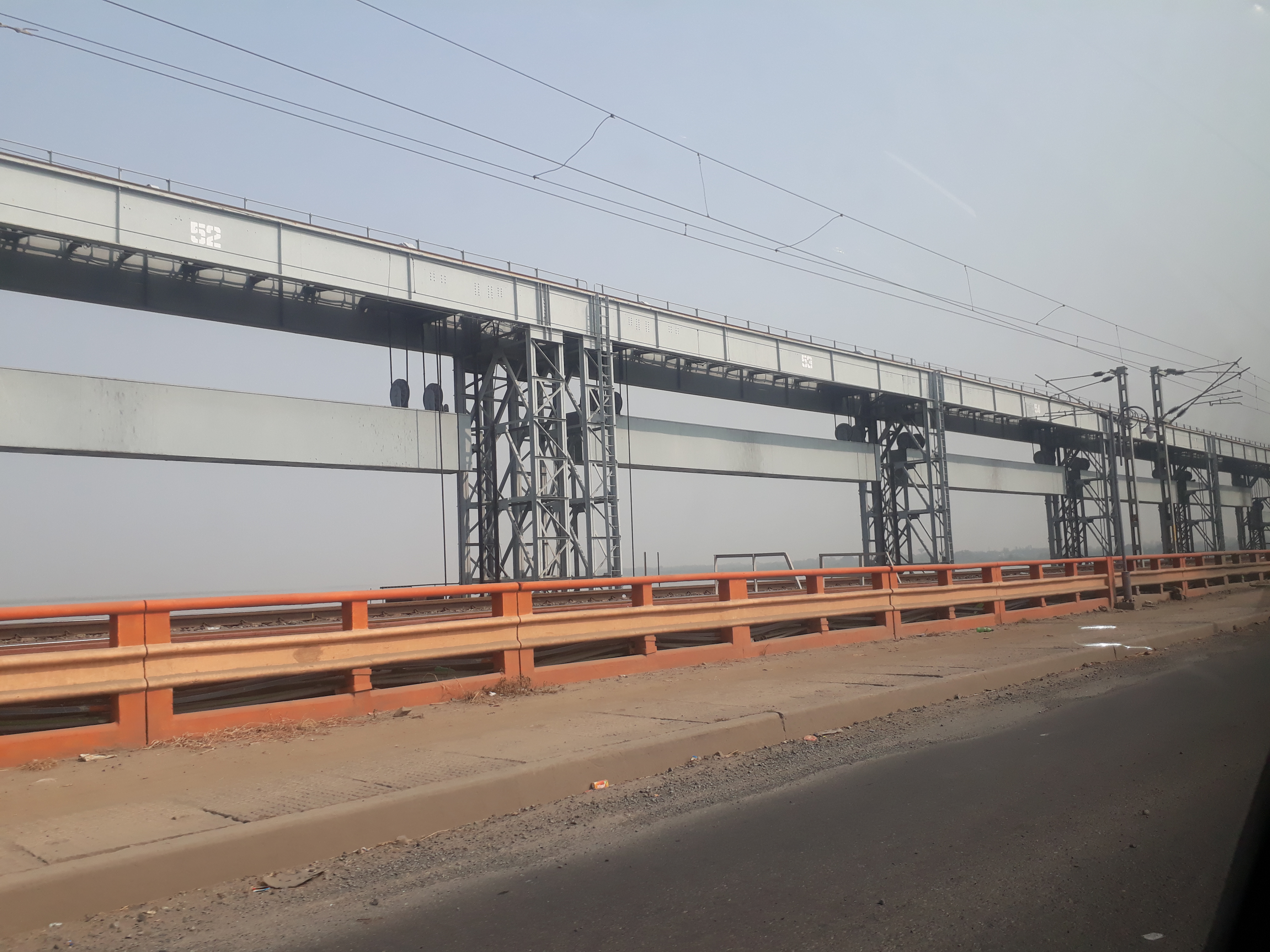
- Highway on the Farakka Barrage, with the railway track by its side

- Location of the Farakka Barrage in West Bengal Farakka Barrage (India)
- Location: Malda & Murshidabad, West Bengal, India
- Coordinates: 24°48′16″N 87°55′59″E
- Construction began: 1961
- Opening date: 1972
- Construction cost: $1 billion

Dam and spillways
- Impounds: Ganges River
- Length: 2,304 metres (7,559 ft)

Farakka Barrage is a barrage across the Ganga river located in Murshidabad district in the Indian state of West Bengal, roughly 18 kilometres (11 mi) from the border with Bangladesh near Shibganj. Farakka Barrage Township is located in Farakka (community development block) in Murshidabad district. Construction of the barrage started in 1962, and was completed in 1970 at a cost of 1 billion dollars. It became operational on 21 April 1975. The barrage is about 2,304 metres (7,559 ft) long. The Feeder Canal (Farakka) from the barrage to the Bhagirathi-Hooghly River is about 42 km (26 mi) long.

== Geography ==
Cities, towns and locations in the northern portion of Jangipur subdivision, Murshidabad district (including Farakka, Samserganj, Suti II CD blocks)
M: municipal town, CT: census town, R: rural/ urban centre, F: Facility
Abbreviation- TPS: Thermal Power Station
Owing to space constraints in the small map, the actual locations in a larger map may vary slightly
Cities, towns and locations in the southern portion of Jangipur subdivision, Murshidabad district (including Suti I, Raghunathganj I, Raghunathganj II, Sagardighi CD blocks)
M: municipal town, CT: census town, R: rural/ urban centre, F: Facility
Abbreviation- TPS: Thermal Power Station, AMU: Aligarh Muslim University
Owing to space constraints in the small map, the actual locations in a larger map may vary slightly

=== Location ===
Faraka Barrage is located at 24°48′16″N 87°55′59″E.

Note: The two maps present some of the notable locations in the subdivision. All places marked in the maps are linked in the larger full screen maps.

== Purpose ==
The barrage was constructed by Hindustan Construction Company. Out of 109 gates, 108 are over the river and one over the low-lying land in Malda, as a precaution. The Barrage serves water to the Farakka Super Thermal Power Station. There are also 60 small canals which can divert some water to other destinations for drinking purposes, etc.

The purpose of the barrage is to divert 1,800 cubic metres per second (64,000 cu ft/s) of water from the Ganges to the Hooghly River for flushing out sediment deposition from Kolkata harbour without the need of regular mechanical dredging. After commissioning the project, it was found that the diverted water flow from the Farakka barrage was not adequate to flush the sediment from the river satisfactorily. In addition, there are regular land/bank collapses in to the Ganga river due to the high level back waters of the Farakka barrage. Substantial high land is already converted into low level river bed causing displacement of huge populations. The water diverted from the Farakka barrage is less than 10% of Ganga river water available at Farakka.

== Farakka water sharing treaty ==
As per the treaty between India and Bangladesh, signed in 1996, for sharing of the Ganges water at Farakka, the division is as follows:

| Availability at Farakka | Share of India | Share of Bangladesh |
|---|---|---|
| 70,000 cusecs or less | 50% | 50% |
| 70,000 – 75,000 cusecs | Balance of the flow | 35,000 cusecs |
| 75,000 cusecs or more | 40,000 cusecs | Balance of the flow |

== Impact ==
Farakka barrage has led to following problems upstream of the barrage:

- Interception of the flow channel being changed from straight to oblique
- Sedimentation (640 x106 metric tonnes per year)
- Reduction of the cross-sectional area
- Declining slope of the long profile
- Widening of the river and increasing length
- Increase in flood frequency and magnitude

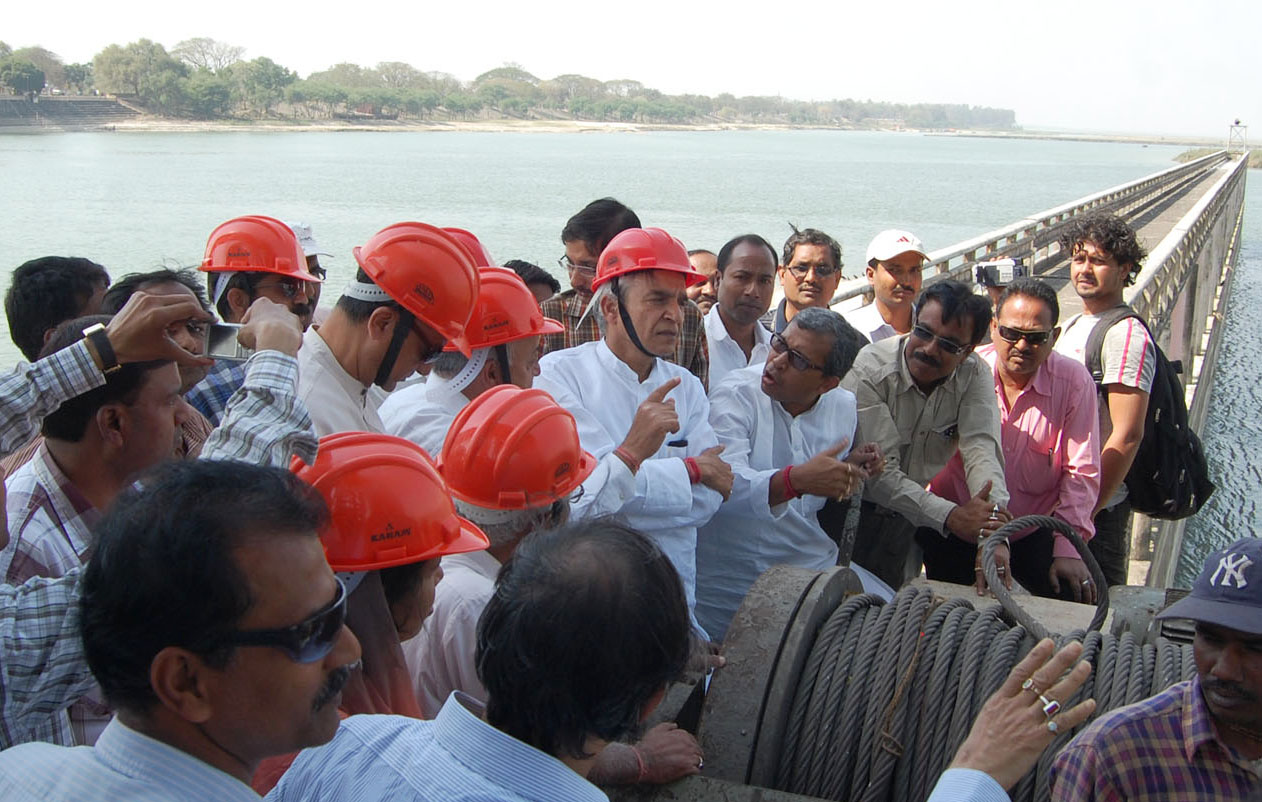
Union minister, Pawan Kumar Bansal, inspecting damaged gate no. 16 at Farakka Barrage in 2012

The Ganges is one of the major rivers of the world. It rises at an elevation of about 4,356 metres (14,291 ft) in Gangotri on the southern slope of the Himalayan range. About 70% of the total population of Bangladesh and about 50% of the Indian population live in the Ganges basin; 43% of the total irrigated area in India is also in the Ganges basin and there are about 100 urban settlements with a total population of about 120 million on its banks. As a result, Bangladesh and India have had many debates about how the Farakka Barrage cuts off Bangladesh's water supply and how to share the water. Right from the beginning, this created a concern for Bangladesh as it constitutes the low-lying part of the Gangetic valley. After the completion of the barrage at the end of 1975, it was agreed to run it with specified discharges for a period of 41 days from 21 April to 31 May during the remaining period of the dry season of 1975 under an accord announced as a joint press release on 18 April 1975. But after the assassination of Sheikh Mujibur Rahman on 15 August 1975, relations between the two countries became greatly strained and India continued to withdraw water even after the agreed period. The diversions led to a crisis situation in Bangladesh in the dry season of 1976. In 1977, Bangladesh went to the United Nations and lodged a formal protest against India with the General Assembly of The United Nations, which adopted a consensus statement on 26 November 1976. Talks between the two countries were resumed in December 1976. No consensus was reached.

Twenty years later, in 1996, a 30-year agreement was signed. It did not contain any guarantee clause for unconditional minimum amounts of water to be supplied to Bangladesh or India, nor could the future hydrological parameters taken into account as is always the case when water resources are planned on historic data series. As a result, the agreement is sometimes perceived to be failed by some sections in Bangladesh to provide the expected result. Constant monitoring of the implementation of negotiations in lean season continue to the present today. In Bangladesh, it is perceived that the diversion has raised salinity levels, contaminated fisheries, hindered navigation, and posed a threat to water quality and public health. Lower levels of soil moisture along with increased salinity have also led to desertification. However, this barrage still has significant effect on the mutual relation of these two neighboring countries.

== Environmental Impact ==
Farakka barrage has been criticized for the floods in Bihar as it is causing excessive siltation in the Ganga.

Farakka barrage also greatly reduced fish migration up the Ganga river. Adult sea fish, like the Hilsa fish usually breed in fresh water river. After Farakka Barrage was built, there were no Ilish migration fish ladders built to provide spawning area for the fish. After the building of hilsha fish dwindles greatly in India, while the fish thrived in the lower Padma river river in Bangladesh.

After the construction of the Farakka Barrage in West Bengal, the maximum flows in the Ganga-Padma River were reduced significantly. The flow reduction caused many problems in India and Bangladesh, including the loss of fish species, the drying of Padma's distributaries, increased saltwater intrusion from the Bay of Bengal, and damage to the mangrove forests of the Sundarbans.

Starting in 2016, some fish ladders have been built on the Farakkha barrage

== See also ==
- Farakka Super Thermal Power Station
- Farakka Long March (1976 protest)
- Ganges Barrage Project
- Sharing the water of the Ganges
- River bank erosion along the Ganges in Malda and Murshidabad districts
- Indian Rivers Inter-link
- Kalpasar Project
- List of longest bridges in the world
- List of longest bridges above water in India
