= Raghunathganj I =

- Community development block
- Interactive map of Raghunathganj I
- Coordinates: 24.46°N 88.07°E
- Country: India
- State: West Bengal
- District: Murshidabad

Government
  - Type: Federal democracy

Area
  - Total: 94.65 km^{2} (36.54 sq mi)
- Elevation: 31 m (102 ft)

Population (2011)
  - Total: 195,627
  - Density: 2,067/km^{2} (5,353/sq mi)

Languages
  - Official: Bengali, English

Literacy
  - Literacy (2011): 64.49%
- Time zone: UTC+5:30 (IST)
- PIN: 742225 (Ragunathganj); 742213 (Jangipur Barrage)
- Telephone/STD code: 03483
- ISO 3166 code: IN-WB
- Vehicle registration: WB-93, WB- 94
- Lok Sabha constituency: Jangipur
- Vidhan Sabha constituency: Jangipur
- Website: murshidbad.nic.in

Raghunathganj I is a community development block that forms an administrative division in the Jangipur subdivision of Murshidabad district in the Indian state of West Bengal.

== Geography ==
Raghunathganj is located at 24°28′N 88°04′E

Raghunathganj I CD block lies in the Rarh region in Murshidabad district. The Bhagirathi River splits the district into two natural physiographic regions – Rarh on the west and Bagri on the east. The Rarh region is undulating and contains mostly clay and lateritic clay based soil. As the Rajmahal hills slopes gently down from adjoining Jharkhand it forms the Nabagram plain at the lowest edge of its elevation in this region. The eastern slope of the region is characterised by the existence of numerous cliffs and bluffs.

Raghunathganj I CD block is bounded by Suti I CD block in the north, Raghunathganj II CD block in the east, Sagardighi CD block in the south and Pakuria CD block in Pakur district of Jharkhand and Murarai II CD block in Birbhum district in the west.

The Bansloi River enters the district (from Birbhum district) near Hussianpur, flows eastward and joins the Bhagirathi north of Jangipur.

The Rarh region or the western part of the district is drained by the right bank tributaries of the Bhagirathi, flowing down from the hilly / plateau region of Santhal Pargana division in neighbouring Jharkhand. The Farakka Barrage regulates the flow of water into the Bhagirathi through the feeder canal. Thereafter, it is fed with the discharge from the Mayurakshi system. About 1,800 km^{2} of area in the neighbourhood of Kandi town is flooded by the combined discharge of the Mayurakshi, Dwarka, Brahmani, Gambhira, Kopai and Bakreshwar – the main contributor being the Mayurakshi. Certain other areas in the western sector also get flooded.

A major problem in Murshidabad district is river bank erosion. As of 2013, an estimated 2.4 million people reside along the banks of the Ganges alone in Murshidabad district.

See also - River bank erosion along the Ganges in Malda and Murshidabad districts

Raghunathganj I CD block has an area of 140.91 km^{2}. It has 1 panchayat samity, 6 gram panchayats, 117 gram sansads (village councils), 63 mouzas and 56 inhabited villages. Raghunathganj police station serves this block. Headquarters of this CD block is at Raghunathganj.

Gram panchayats in Raghunathganj I block/ panchayat samiti are: Dafarpur, Jamuar, Jarur, Kanupur, Mirzapur and Raninagar.

== Demographics ==
=== Population ===
According to the 2011 Census of India, Raghunathganj I CD block had a total population of 195,627, of which 133,114 were rural and 62,513 were urban. There were 100,295 (50%) males and 95,332 (50%) females. Population in the age range 0-6 years numbered 29,157. Scheduled Castes numbered 53,027 (27.11%) and Scheduled Tribes numbered 2,602 (1.33).

As per 2001 census, Raghunathganj I block has a total population of 154,349, out of which 77,727 were males and 76,622 were females. Raghunathganj I block registered a population growth of 30.09 per cent during the 1991-2001 decade. Decadal growth for the district was 23.70 per cent. Decadal growth in West Bengal was 17.84 per cent.

Decadal Population Growth Rate (%)

- Raghunathganj I CD block
- Murshidabad district
- West Bengal

The decadal growth of population in Raghunathganj I CD block in 2001-2011 was 26.73%.

The decadal growth rate of population in Murshidabad district was as follows: 33.5% in 1951–61, 28.6% in 1961–71, 25.5% in 1971–81, 28.2% in 1981-91, 23.8% in 1991-2001 and 21.1% in 2001-11. The decadal growth rate for West Bengal in 2001-11 was 13.93%.

The decadal growth rate of population in Chapai Nawabganj District in Bangladesh was 15.59% for the decade 2001–2011, down from 21.67% in the decade 1991-2001.

There are reports of Bangladeshi infiltrators entering Murshidabad district.

=== Census towns and villages ===
Census towns in Raghunathganj I CD block were (2011 population figures in brackets): Ghorsala (7,837), Srikantabati (14,027), Charka (8,451), Dafarpur (16,587), Ramnagar (9,528) and Mirzapur (6,083).

Large villages in Raghunathgaj I CD block were (2011 population figures in brackets): Kanupur (8,865), Sujapur (P) (4,717), Baindhya (3,612), Nait Baidara (4,212), Barala (5,580), Jarur (6,435), Umarpur (4,384), Kankaria (4,363), Talai (4,156), Ramkantapur (5,208), Ramchandrabati (5,648), Gankar (4,574), Rajnagar (4,586) and Nutanganj (5,805).

=== Literacy ===
As per the 2011 census, the total number of literate persons in Raghunathganj I CD block was 107,358 (64.49% of the population over 6 years) out of which males numbered 58,990 (68.99% of the male population over 6 years) and females numbered 48,368 (59.74% of the female population over 6 years). The gender disparity (the difference between female and male literacy rates) was 9.24%.

See also – List of West Bengal districts ranked by literacy rate

Literacy in CD blocks of
Murshidabad district
Jangipur subdivision
Farakka – 59.75%
Samserganj – 54.98%
Suti I – 58.40%
Suti II – 55.23%
Raghunathganj I – 64.49%
Raghunathganj II – 61.17%
Sagardighi – 65.27%
Lalbag subdivision
Murshidabad-Jiaganj – 69.14%
Bhagawangola I - 57.22%
Bhagawangola II – 53.48%
Lalgola– 64.32%
Nabagram – 70.83%
Sadar subdivision
Berhampore – 73.51%
Beldanga I – 70.06%
Beldanga II – 67.86%
Hariharpara – 69.20%
Naoda – 66.09%
Kandi subdivision
Kandi – 65.13%
Khargram – 63.56%
Burwan – 68.96%
Bharatpur I – 62.93%
Bharatpur II – 66.07%
Domkol subdivision
Domkal – 55.89%
Raninagar I – 57.81%
Raninagar II – 54.81%
Jalangi – 58.73%
Source: 2011 Census: CD Block Wise
Primary Census Abstract Data

=== Language and religion ===
Religion in Raghunathganj I CD block (2011)
| Islam | 56.48% |
| Hinduism | 43.32% |
| Other or not stated | 0.20% |

In the 2011 census Muslims numbered 110,487 and formed 56.48% of the population in Raghunathganj I CD block. Hindus numbered 84,737 and formed 43.32% of the population. Others numbered 403 and formed 0.20% of the population. In Raghunathganj I and Raghunathganj II CD blocks taken together, while the proportion of Muslims increased from 66.72% in 1991 to 67.39% in 2001, the proportion of Hindus declined from 33.20% in 1991 to 32.61% in 2001.

Murshidabad district had 4,707,573 Muslims who formed 66.27% of the population, 2,359,061 Hindus who formed 33.21% of the population, and 37, 173 persons belonging to other religions who formed 0.52% of the population, in the 2011 census. While the proportion of Muslim population in the district increased from 61.40% in 1991 to 63.67% in 2001, the proportion of Hindu population declined from 38.39% in 1991 to 35.92% in 2001.

Murshidabad was the only Muslim majority district in West Bengal at the time of partition of India in 1947. The proportion of Muslims in the population of Murshidabad district in 1951 was 55.24%. The Radcliffe Line had placed Muslim majority Murshidabad in India and the Hindu majority Khulna in Pakistan, in order to maintain the integrity of the Ganges river system In India.

Languages of Raghunathganj I CD block (2011)
1. Bengali (97.4%)
2. Khotta (1.28%)
3. Others (1.28%)

At the time of the 2011 census, 97.44% of the population spoke Bengali and 1.28% Khotta as their first language.

== Rural poverty ==
As per the Human Development Report 2004 for West Bengal, the rural poverty ratio in Murshidabad district was 46.12%. Purulia, Bankura and Birbhum districts had higher rural poverty ratios. These estimates were based on Central Sample data of NSS 55th round 1999-2000.

== Economy ==
=== Livelihood ===
Livelihood
in Raghunathganj I CD block
1. Cultivators (7.03%)
2. Agricultural labourers (16.7%)
3. Household industries (29.0%)
4. Other Workers (47.3%)

In Raghunathganj I CD block in 2011, amongst the class of total workers, cultivators numbered 5,898 and formed 7.03%, agricultural labourers numbered 14,243 and formed 16.69%, household industry workers numbered 24,735 and formed 28.98% and other workers numbered 40,366 and formed 47.30%.

=== Infrastructure ===
There are 56 inhabited villages in Raghunathganj I CD block. 100% villages have power supply and drinking water supply. 9 villages (16.07%) have post offices. 53 villages (94.64%) have telephones (including landlines, public call offices and mobile phones). 21 villages (37.50%) have a pucca approach road and 22 villages (39.29%) have transport communication (includes bus service, rail facility and navigable waterways). 4 villages (7.14%) have agricultural credit societies and 5 villages (8.13%) have banks.

=== Agriculture ===
From 1977 onwards major land reforms took place in West Bengal. Land in excess of land ceiling was acquired and distributed amongst the peasants. Following land reforms land ownership pattern has undergone transformation. In 2013–14, persons engaged in agriculture in Raghunathganj I CD block could be classified as follows: bargadars 3,969 (12.22%), patta (document) holders 5,551 (17.08%), small farmers (possessing land between 1 and 2 hectares) 1,102 (3.39%), marginal farmers (possessing land up to 1 hectare) 7,626 (23.47%) and agricultural labourers 14,243 (43.84%).

Raghunathganj I CD block had 57 fertiliser depots, 1 seed store and 32 fair price shops in 2013-14.

In 2013–14, Raghunathganj I CD block produced 3,172 tonnes of Aman paddy, the main winter crop from 1,120 hectares, 9,199 tonnes of Boro paddy (spring crop) from 3,456 hectares, 9,326 tonnes of wheat from 3,703 hectares, 111 tonnes of maize from 43 hectares, 18,842 tonnes of jute from 1,582 hectares and 2,752 tonnes of potatoes from 95 hectares. It also produced pulses and oilseeds.

In 2013–14, the total area irrigated in Raghunathganj I CD block was 2,204 hectares, out of which 100 hectares were irrigated by canal water, 1,602 hectares with tank water, 142 hectares with river lift irrigation, 100 hectares with deep tube wells and 260 hectares by other means.

=== Beedi industry ===
As of 2003, around 400,000 workers were engaged in the prime area locations of beedi making, a household industry, in Farakka, Samserganj, Suti I, Suti II, Raghunathganj I and Raghunathganj II CD blocks. The majority of those working are women and children. Almost all households are engaged in this activity.

See also – Beedi Workers of Murshidabad (in Hindi). Lok Sabha TV feature

=== Silk and handicrafts ===
Murshidabad is famous for its silk industry since the Middle Ages. There are three distinct categories in this industry, namely (i) Mulberry cultivation and silkworm rearing (ii) Peeling of raw silk (iii) Weaving of silk fabrics. Prime locations for weaving (silk and cotton) are: Khargram, Raghunathganj I, Nabagram, Beldanga I, Beldanga II and Raninagar-I CD Blocks.

Ivory carving is an important cottage industry from the era of the Nawabs. The main areas where this industry has flourished are Khagra and Jiaganj. Bell metal and Brass utensils are manufactured in large quantities at Khagra, Berhampore, Kandi and Jangipur. 99% of ivory craft production is exported. In more recent years sandalwood etching has become more popular than ivory carving.

=== Banking ===
In 2013–14, Raghunathgaj I CD block had offices of 7 commercial banks and 1 gramin bank.

=== Backward Regions Grant Fund ===
Murshidabad district is listed as a backward region and receives financial support from the Backward Regions Grant Fund. The fund, created by the Government of India, is designed to redress regional imbalances in development. As of 2012, 272 districts across the country were listed under this scheme. The list includes 11 districts of West Bengal.

== Transport ==
Raghunathganj I CD block has 5 ferry services and 18 originating/ terminating bus routes.

The Barharwa-Azimganj-Katwa loop line passes through this block and there are stations at Jangipur Road and Gankar.

NH 12 (old number NH 34) passes through this block.

State Highway 11A, running from Raghunathganj to Bhagawangola passes through this CD block.

== Education ==
In 2013–14, Raghunathganj I CD block had 84 primary schools with 13,527 students, 5 middle schools with 614 students, 4 high schools with 4,609 students and 7 higher secondary schools with 17,405 students. Raghunathganj I CD block had 1 technical/ professional institution with 100 students, 367 institutions special and non-formal education with 20,214 students.

Management Development Institute, Murshidabad, was established at Sakim Katnai, Kutori, PO Uttar Ramna, PS Raghunathganj. MDI, Murshidabad campus was inaugurated by Pranab Mukherjee, President of India, in 2014. It offers a residential post-graduate programme in management.

In Raghunathganj I CD block, amongst the 56 inhabited villages, 3 villages did not have a school, 27 villages have more than 1 primary school, 14 villages have at least 1 primary and 1 middle school and 10 villages had at least 1 middle and 1 secondary school.

== Healthcare ==
In 2014, Raghunathganj I CD block had 1 block primary health centre, 2 primary health centres and 2 private nursing homes with total 42 beds and 3 doctors (excluding private bodies). It had 22 family welfare subcentres. 4,457 patients were treated indoor and 89,312 patients were treated outdoor in the hospitals, health centres and subcentres of the CD Block.

Raghunathganj I CD block has Rajnagar Block Primary Health Centre (with 6 beds) at Rajnagar, Barla Primary Health Centre (with 10 beds) and Gankar PHC (with 2 beds). The Subdivisional Hospital at Jangipur (with 250 beds) is outside the CD Block.

Raghunathganj I CD block is one of the areas of Murshidabad district where ground water is affected by a high level of arsenic contamination. The WHO guideline for arsenic in drinking water is 10 mg/ litre, and the Indian Standard value is 50 mg/ litre. All but one of the 26 blocks of Murshidabad district have arsenic contamination above the WHO level, all but two of the blocks have arsenic concentration above the Indian Standard value and 17 blocks have arsenic concentration above 300 mg/litre. The maximum concentration in Raghunathaganj I CD Block is 3,003 mg/litre.
