= Balutungi =

- Village
- Location in West Bengal, India
- Coordinates: 24.3817°N 88.2767°E
- Country: India
- State: West Bengal
- District: Murshidabad

Government
  - Type: Panchayat

Languages
  - Official: Bengali, English
- Time zone: UTC+5:30 (IST)
- Lok Sabha constituency: Jangipur
- Vidhan Sabha constituency: Lalgola
- Website: murshidabad.gov.in

Balutungi is a village in Lalgola CD Block in Lalbag subdivision of Murshidabad district in West Bengal.

== Geography ==
Balutungi is bordered by four villages: in the east by Airmari, in the west by Fudhkipara and Basupara, in the north by Madhupur, and in the south by Dhulauri.

== Transport ==
SH 11A, running from Bhagawangola to Raghunathganj passes through Balutungi.

== Education ==
- Balutungi High School, established in 1951.
- Balutungi Junior Girls' High School, established in 1968.
