= Raghunathganj II =

- Community development block
- Interactive map of Raghunathganj II
- Coordinates: 24.46°N 88.10°E
- Country: India
- State: West Bengal
- District: Murshidabad

Government
  - Type: Federal democracy

Area
  - Total: 99.77 km^{2} (38.52 sq mi)
- Elevation: 31 m (102 ft)

Population (2011)
  - Total: 265,336
  - Density: 2,659/km^{2} (6,888/sq mi)

Languages
  - Official: Bengali, English

Literacy
  - Literacy: 61.17%
- Time zone: UTC+5:30 (IST)
- PIN: 742213 (Jangipur); 742230 (Giria)
- Telephone/STD code: 03485
- ISO 3166 code: IN-WB
- Vehicle registration: WB-57, WB - 58
- Lok Sabha constituency: Jangipur
- Vidhan Sabha constituency: Raghunathganj
- Website: murshidbad.nic.in

Raghunathganj II is a community development block that forms an administrative division in the Jangipur subdivision of Murshidabad district in the Indian state of West Bengal.

== Geography ==
Jot Kamal, a census town in Raghunathganj II block, is located at 24°28′N 88°06′E

Raghunathganj II CD block lies in the Rarh region in Murshidabad district. The Bhagirathi River splits the district into two natural physiographic regions – Rarh on the west and Bagri on the east. The Padma River separates Murshidabad district from Malda district and Chapai Nawabganj and Rajshahi districts of Bangladesh in the north. The Rarh region is undulating and contains mostly clay and lateritic clay based soil. As the Rajmahal hills slopes gently down from adjoining Jharkhand it forms the Nabagram plain at the lowest edge of its elevation in this region. The eastern slope of the region is characterised by the existence of numerous cliffs and bluffs.

Raghunathganj II CD block is bounded by Suti I CD block in the north, Lalgola CD block and Shibganj Upazila in Chapai Nawabganj District of Bangladesh, across the Ganges, in the east, Sagardighi CD block in the south and Raghunathganj I CD block in the west.

Murshidabad district has a 125.35 km long international border with Bangladesh of which 42.35 km is on land and the remaining is riverine. There are 9 blocks – Samserganj, Suti I, Suti II, Raghunathganj II, Lalgola, Bhagawangola I, Bhagawangola II, Raninagar II and Jalangi - along the Bangladesh-India border.

The Rarh region or the western part of the district is drained by the right bank tributaries of the Bhagirathi, flowing down from the hilly / plateau region of Santhal Pargana division in neighbouring Jharkhand. The Farakka Barrage regulates the flow of water into the Bhagirathi through the feeder canal. Thereafter, it is fed with the discharge from the Mayurakshi system. About 1,800 km^{2} of area in the neighbourhood of Kandi town is flooded by the combined discharge of the Mayurakshi, Dwarka, Brahmani, Gambhira, Kopai and Bakreshwar – the main contributor being the Mayurakshi. Certain other areas in the western sector also get flooded.

A major problem in Murshidabad district is river bank erosion. As of 2013, an estimated 2.4 million people reside along the banks of the Ganges alone in Murshidabad district. Between 1931 and 1977, 26,769 hectares have been eroded and many villages have been fully submerged. 1980-1990 was a decade of erosion for this district and during the decade Giria, Sekhalipur, Khejustala, Mithipur, Fajilpur, Rajapur, Akheriganj, Parashpur villages were badly affected.

See also - River bank erosion along the Ganges in Malda and Murshidabad districts

Raghunathganj II CD block has an area of 140.91 km^{2}. It has 1 panchayat samity, 10 gram panchayats, 117 gram sansads (village councils), 63 mouzas and 56 inhabited villages. Raghunathganj police station serves this block. Headquarters of this CD block is at Giria.

Gram panchayats in Raghunathganj II block/ panchayat samiti are: Barashimul Dayarampur, Giria, Jotekamal, Kashiadanga, Laxmijola, Mithipur, Sammatinagar, Sekendra, Sekhalipur and Teghari I.

== Demographics ==
=== Population ===
According to the 2011 Census of India, Raghunathganj II CD block had a total population of 265,336, of which 131,236 were rural and 134,100 were urban. There were 135,723 (51%) males and 129,613 (49%) females. Population in the age range 0-6 years numbered 46,739. Scheduled Castes numbered 23,242 (8.76%) and Scheduled Tribes numbered 86 (0.03%).

As per 2001 census, Raghunathganj II block has a total population of 192,505, out of which 94,325 were males and 98,180 were females. Raghunathganj II block registered a population growth of 24.14 per cent during the 1991-2001 decade. Decadal growth for the district was 23.70 per cent. Decadal growth in West Bengal was 17.84 per cent.

Decadal Population Growth Rate (%)

- Raghunathganj II CD block
- Murshidabad district
- West Bengal

The decadal growth of population in Raghunathganj II CD block in 2001-2011 was 37.82%, the highest amongst all the CD blocks in the district.

The decadal growth rate of population in Murshidabad district was as follows: 33.5% in 1951-61, 28.6% in 1961-71, 25.5% in 1971-81, 28.2% in 1981-91, 23.8% in 1991-2001 and 21.1% in 2001-11. The decadal growth rate for West Bengal in 2001-11 was 13.93%.

The decadal growth rate of population in neighbouring Chapai Nawabganj District in Bangladesh was 15.59% for the decade 2001-2011, down from 21.67% in the decade 1991-2001.

There are reports of Bangladeshi infiltrators entering Murshidabad district.

=== Census towns and villages ===
Census towns in Raghunathganj II CD block were (2011 population figures in brackets): Giria (17,131), Mithipur (15,260), Jot Kamal (7,685), Osmanpur (10,512), Sahajadpur (23,280), Khodarampur (7,277), Donalia (6,081), Teghari (25,058), Krishna Sali (10,742) and Bara Jumla (11,074).

Large villages in Raghunathganj II CD block were (2011 population figures in brackets): Lal Khandiar (1,223), Giria Kismat (7,153), Sekendara (21,668), Mukundapur (4,009), Jot Sundar (4,207), Putia (4,984), Kul Gachhi (11,292), Jamra (4,692), Bahara (12,862), Kasia Danga (14,025) and Dighir Pahar (4,468).

=== Literacy ===
As per the 2011 census, the total number of literate persons in Raghunathganj II CD block was 133,722 (61.17% of the population over 6 years) out of which males numbered 72,849 (65.03% of the male population over 6 years) and females numbered 61,233 (57.45% of the female population over 6 years). The gender disparity (the difference between female and male literacy rates) was 7.59%.

See also – List of West Bengal districts ranked by literacy rate

Literacy in CD blocks of
Murshidabad district
Jangipur subdivision
Farakka – 59.75%
Samserganj – 54.98%
Suti I – 58.40%
Suti II – 55.23%
Raghunathganj I – 64.49%
Raghunathganj II – 61.17%
Sagardighi – 65.27%
Lalbag subdivision
Murshidabad-Jiaganj – 69.14%
Bhagawangola I - 57.22%
Bhagawangola II – 53.48%
Lalgola– 64.32%
Nabagram – 70.83%
Sadar subdivision
Berhampore – 73.51%
Beldanga I – 70.06%
Beldanga II – 67.86%
Hariharpara – 69.20%
Naoda – 66.09%
Kandi subdivision
Kandi – 65.13%
Khargram – 63.56%
Burwan – 68.96%
Bharatpur I – 62.93%
Bharatpur II – 66.07%
Domkol subdivision
Domkal – 55.89%
Raninagar I – 57.81%
Raninagar II – 54.81%
Jalangi – 58.73%
Source: 2011 Census: CD Block Wise
Primary Census Abstract Data

=== Language and religion ===
Religion in Raghunathganj II CD block (2011)
Islam	81.97%
Hinduism	17.87%
Other or not stated	0.16%

In the 2011 census Muslims numbered 217,502 and formed 81.97% of the population in Raghunathganj II CD block. Hindus numbered 47,403 and formed 17.87% of the population. Others numbered 431 and formed 0.16% of the population. In Raghunathganj I and Raghunathganj II CD blocks taken together, while the proportion of Muslims increased from 66.72% in 1991 to 67.39% in 2001, the proportion of Hindus declined from 33.20% in 1991 to 32.61% in 2001.

Murshidabad district had 4,707,573 Muslims who formed 66.27% of the population, 2,359,061 Hindus who formed 33.21% of the population, and 37, 173 persons belonging to other religions who formed 0.52% of the population, in the 2011 census. While the proportion of Muslim population in the district increased from 61.40% in 1991 to 63.67% in 2001, the proportion of Hindu population declined from 38.39% in 1991 to 35.92% in 2001.

Murshidabad was the only Muslim majority district in West Bengal at the time of partition of India in 1947. The proportion of Muslims in the population of Murshidabad district in 1951 was 55.24%. The Radcliffe Line had placed Muslim majority Murshidabad in India and the Hindu majority Khulna in Pakistan, in order to maintain the integrity of the Ganges river system In India.

Bengali is the predominant language, spoken by 99.84% of the population.

== Rural poverty ==
As per the Human Development Report 2004 for West Bengal, the rural poverty ratio in Murshidabad district was 46.12%. Purulia, Bankura and Birbhum districts had higher rural poverty ratios. These estimates were based on Central Sample data of NSS 55th round 1999-2000.

== Economy ==
=== Livelihood ===
Livelihood
in Raghunathganj II CD block
1. Cultivators (3.90%)
2. Agricultural labourers (7.25%)
3. Household industries (37.3%)
4. Other Workers (51.5%)

In Raghunathganj II CD block in 2011, amongst the class of total workers, cultivators numbered 4,541 and formed 3.90%, agricultural labourers numbered 8,438 and formed 7.25%, household industry workers numbered 43,428 and formed 37.34% and other workers numbered 59,910 and formed 51.51%.

=== Infrastructure ===
There are 36 inhabited villages in Raghunathganj II CD block. 100% villages have power supply. 35 villages (97.22%) have drinking water supply. 12 villages (33.33%) have post offices. 25 villages (69.44%) have telephones (including landlines, public call offices and mobile phones). 18 villages (50.00%) have a pucca approach road and 6 villages (16.67%) have transport communication (includes bus service, rail facility and navigable waterways). 2 villages (5.56%) have agricultural credit societies and 4 villages (11.11%) have banks.

=== Agriculture ===
From 1977 onwards major land reforms took place in West Bengal. Land in excess of land ceiling was acquired and distributed amongst the peasants. Following land reforms land ownership pattern has undergone transformation. In 2013-14, persons engaged in agriculture in Raghunathganj II CD block could be classified as follows: bargadars 1,029 (4.17%), patta (document) holders 6,765 (27.41%), small farmers (possessing land between 1 and 2 hectares) 1,302 (5.27%), marginal farmers (possessing land up to 1 hectare) 7,150 (28.97%) and agricultural labourers 8,438 (34.18%).

Raghunathganj II CD block had 22 fertiliser depots, 1 seed store and 48 fair price shops in 2013-14.

In 2013-14, Raghunathganj II CD block produced 31,471 tonnes of Aman paddy, the main winter crop from 10,177 hectares, 384 tonnes of Boro paddy (spring crop) from 114 hectares, 141 tonnes of Aus paddy (summer crop) from103 hectares, 2,875 tonnes of wheat from 1,000 hectares, 32,052 tonnes of jute from 2,002 hectares, 83 tonnes of potatoes from 30 hectares and 160 tonnes of sugar cane from 2 hectares. It also produced pulses and oilseeds.

In 2013-14, the total area irrigated in Raghunathganj II CD block was 1,499 hectares, out of which 60 hectares were irrigated with tank water, 239 hectares with river lift irrigation and 1,200 hectares by other means.

=== Beedi industry ===
As of 2003, around 400,000 workers were engaged in the prime area locations of beedi making, a household industry, in Farakka, Samserganj, Suti I, Suti II, Raghunathganj I and Raghunathganj II CD blocks. The majority of those working are women and children. Almost all households are engaged in this activity.

See also – Beedi Workers of Murshidabad (in Hindi). Lok Sabha TV feature

=== Silk and handicrafts ===
Murshidabad is famous for its silk industry since the Middle Ages. There are three distinct categories in this industry, namely (i) Mulberry cultivation and silkworm rearing (ii) Peeling of raw silk (iii) Weaving of silk fabrics.

Ivory carving is an important cottage industry from the era of the Nawabs. The main areas where this industry has flourished are Khagra and Jiaganj. 99% of ivory craft production is exported. In more recent years sandalwood etching has become more popular than ivory carving. Bell metal and Brass utensils are manufactured in large quantities at Khagra, Berhampore, Kandi and Jangipur.

=== Banking ===
In 2013-14, Raghunathgaj II CD block had offices of 8 commercial banks and 2 gramin banks.

=== Backward Regions Grant Fund ===
Murshidabad district is listed as a backward region and receives financial support from the Backward Regions Grant Fund. The fund, created by the Government of India, is designed to redress regional imbalances in development. As of 2012, 272 districts across the country were listed under this scheme. The list includes 11 districts of West Bengal.

== Transport ==
Raghunathganj II CD block has 5 ferry services and 2 originating/ terminating bus routes.

State Highway 11A, running from Raghunathganj to Bhagawangola passes through this CD block.

== Education ==
In 2013-14, Raghunathganj II CD block had 97 primary schools with 16,519 students, 13 middle schools with 1,511 students, 3 high schools with 4,600 students and 8 higher secondary schools with 20,430 students. Raghunathganj II CD block had 407 institutions special and non-formal education with 24,104 students.

In Raghunathganj II CD block, amongst the 36 inhabited villages, 3 villages did not have a school, 22 villages have more than 1 primary school, 21 villages have at least 1 primary and 1 middle school and 7 villages had at least 1 middle and 1 secondary school.

== Healthcare ==
In 2014, Raghunathganj II CD block had 1 block primary health centre and 1 primary health centre with total 25 beds and 6 doctors (excluding private bodies). It had 28 family welfare subcentres. 6,683 patients were treated indoor and 107,434 patients were treated outdoor in the hospitals, health centres and subcentres of the CD Block.

Raghunathganj II CD block has Teghari Block Primary Health Centre (with 10 beds) at Teghari and Mohammadpur Primary Health Centre at Adikantapur (with 10 beds). The Subdivisional Hospital at Jangipur (with 250 beds) is outside the CD block.

Raghunathganj II CD block is one of the areas of Murshidabad district where ground water is affected by a high level of arsenic contamination. The WHO guideline for arsenic in drinking water is 10 mg/ litre, and the Indian Standard value is 50 mg/ litre. All but one of the 26 blocks of Murshidabad district have arsenic contamination above the WHO level, all but two of the blocks have arsenic concentration above the Indian Standard value and 17 blocks have arsenic concentration above 300 mg/litre. The maximum concentration in Raghunathaganj II CD block is 875 mg/litre.
