= Mohammad Ali (West Bengal politician) =

Indian politician

Member of the West Bengal Legislative Assembly for Lalgola
- In office 5 May 2021 – 3 May 2026
- Preceded by: Abu Hena
- Succeeded by: Abdul Aziz

Personal details
- Party: Trinamool Congress
- Profession: Politician

Ali Mohammad is an Indian politician from West Bengal. He was elected to the West Bengal Legislative Assembly from Lalgola constituency in the 2021 West Bengal Legislative Assembly election representing the Trinamool Congress.

== Early life and education ==
Mohammad is from Lalgola, Murshidabad district, West Bengal.

== Career ==
Mohammad broke the family reign of Abu Hena in the constituency, defeating the seven-time MLA. Earlier, Hena's father, Abdus Sattar, was also a seven-time MLA. The family ruled the constituency from 1967 to 2020. Mohammad won the 2021 West Bengal Legislative Assembly election.
