= Zainal Abedin =

Indian politician

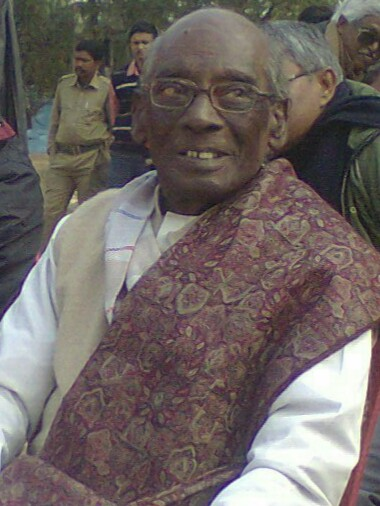
- Zainal Abedin

Member of Parliament, Lok Sabha
- In office 1980–1996
- Constituency: Jangipur

Personal details
- Born: 29 October 1938 Kabilpur, Bengal Presidency, British India
- Died: 2014 (aged 75–76) Kabilpur, Murshidabad, West Bengal, India
- Party: Communist Party of India (Marxist)
- Spouse: Rubeda Begum
- Children: 5 sons

Zainal Abedin is a Communist Party of India (Marxist) politician and was four-time MP.

== Early life ==
Zainal Abedin, son of Wareshtullah Mandal, was born on 29 October 1938 at Kabilpur in Murshidabad district.

A graduate in humanities and education, he was educated at Jangipur College and Union Christian Training College at Baharampur.

He married Rubeda Begum in 1957 and they had five sons.

== Political career ==
He unsuccessfully contested the Lalgola seat for the state assembly in 1977.

He was elected to the Lok Sabha from Jangipur in 1980, 1984, 1989 and 1991.
