= Aurangabad, West Bengal Assembly constituency =

Former West Bengal Legislative Assembly constituency

Coordinates: 24.6°N 88.04°E

Aurangabad
- Former constituency No. 51 for the West Bengal Legislative Assembly

Constituency details
- Country: India
- Region: East India
- State: West Bengal
- District: Murshidabad
- Lok Sabha constituency: Jangipur
- Established: 1977
- Abolished: 2011
- Reservation: None

Aurangabad Assembly constituency was an assembly constituency in Murshidabad district in the Indian state of West Bengal.

== Overview ==
As a consequence of the orders of the Delimitation Commission, Aurangabad Assembly constituency ceases to exist from 2011. There are two new constituencies in the area – Samserganj Assembly constituency and Raghunathganj Assembly constituency.

It was part of Jangipur (Lok Sabha constituency).

== Members of the Legislative Assembly ==
Election Year	Constituency	Name of M.L.A.	Party affiliation
1977	Aurangabad	Lutfal Haque	Indian National Congress
1982		Lutfal Haque	Indian National Congress
1987		Touab Ali	Communist Party of India (Marxist)
1991		Touab Ali	Communist Party of India (Marxist)
1996		Humayun Reza	Indian National Congress
2001		Humayun Reza	Indian National Congress
2006		Touab Ali	Communist Party of India (Marxist)

== Election results ==
=== 1977–2006 ===
In the 2006 state assembly elections, Touab Ali of CPI(M) won the 51 Aurangabad assembly seat defeating his nearest rival Humayun Reza of Congress. Humayun Reza of Congress defeated Nur Mohammad of CPI(M) in 2001 and Touab Ali of CPI(M) in 1996. Touab Ali of CPI(M) defeated Humayun Reza of Congress in 1991 and 1987. Lutfal Haque of Congress defeated Touab Ali of CPI(M) in 1982 and Sohidul Alam of CPI(M) in 1977. The Auragabad constituency did not exist prior to that.
