= Syed Kazim Ali Mirza =

Indian politician

Member of the West Bengal Legislative Assembly
- In office 1952–1967
- Preceded by: constituency established
- Succeeded by: Abdus Sattar
- Constituency: Lalgola Assembly constituency

Personal details
- Party: Indian National Congress

Syed Kazim Ali Mirza was an Indian politician who represented Lalgola in the West Bengal Legislative Assembly from 1952 to 1967.
