= Lutfal Haque =

Indian politician

Member of Legislative Assembly
- In office 1951–67
- Constituency: Suti

Member of Parliament
- In office 1967–77
- Constituency: Jangipur

Member of Legislative Assembly
- In office 1977–87
- Constituency: Aurangabad

Personal details
- Born: 1 December 1911 Rainapur, District: Murshidabad,
- Died: 1985 (aged 73)
- Party: Indian National Congress

Lutfal Haque (also known as Haji Lutfal Haque) was an Indian politician, five-time MLA and two-time MP.

== Early life ==
Lutfal Haque, son of Pir Mohammad, was born at Rainapur in Murshidabad district on 1 December 1911.

He was educated at Presidency College, Kolkata and Hooghly Training College, and became a teacher.

== Political career ==
Lutfal Haque was elected to the West Bengal Legislative Assembly from Suti (Vidhan Sabha constituency) in 1951, 1957 and 1962.

He represented Jangipur in the Lok Sabha from 1967 to 1977.

He won from Aurangabad (Vidhan Sabha constituency) in 1977 and 1982.

He was a member of Murshidabad District Board and Zila Parishad since 1946, District School Board during 1946–67, as well as District Minority Board, Murshidabad, and West Bengal Wakf Board. He was founder secretary of Sultanpur Alia Senior Madarsah, founder president of Jangipur Mahukuma Biri Sramik Union since 1955, one of the founders of D. N. College at Aurangabad and was associated with numerous schools and social service organisations.
