= Abu Hena (Indian politician) =

Indian politician (1950–2025)

Cabinet Minister Government of West Bengal
- In office 20 May 2011 – 22 September 2012
- Governor: M. K. Narayanan
- Preceded by: Kiranmoy Nanda
- Succeeded by: Chandranath Sinha

Member of the West Bengal Legislative Assembly
- In office 1991–2021
- Preceded by: Abdus Sattar
- Succeeded by: Ali Mohammad
- Constituency: Lalgola

Personal details
- Born: 31 January 1950 Lalgola, Murshidabad district, West Bengal, India
- Died: 20 July 2025 (aged 75) Kolkata, West Bengal, India
- Party: Indian National Congress

Abu Hena (31 January 1950 – 20 July 2025) was an Indian National Congress politician, who was a cabinet minister and a five-time Member of the Legislative Assembly from West Bengal.

== Early life and education ==
Abu Hena was born on 31 January 1950 to a Bengali family of Muslim Bishwases in the village of Lalgola in Murshidabad district, West Bengal. His father, Abdus Sattar, was the son of Kalimuddin Bishwas and a cabinet minister in the Siddhartha Shankar Ray government. Abu Hena was a postgraduate with a law degree. He was an advocate, practising in Calcutta High Court.

== Political career ==
Hena was elected from the Lalgola (Vidhan Sabha constituency) in West Bengal in 1991, 1996, 2001, 2006 and 2011.

He was the Minister for Fisheries and the Minister for Food Processing Industries & Horticulture in the Government of West Bengal in 2011. Abu Hena resigned along with five other Congress ministers in September 2012.

Hena was secretary of the state Congress committee.

== Death ==
Hena died after a long illness at his home in Kolkata, on 20 July 2025, at the age of 75.
