= Akhruzzaman =

Indian politician

Minister of State Government of West Bengal
- In office 10 May 2021 – 4 May 2026
- Minister: Aroop Biswas
- Chief Minister: Mamata Banerjee

Member of the West Bengal Legislative Assembly
- Incumbent
- Assumed office 26 May 2011
- Constituency: Raghunathganj

Personal details
- Born: 24 November 1964 (age 61) Kantakhali, West Bengal, India
- Party: Trinamool Congress (since 2018) (until 2026); Democratic Trinamool Congress (from 2026)
- Other political affiliations: Indian National Congress (until 2018)
- Spouse: Hosneara Khatun
- Children: 2
- Education: L.L.B; B.Ed; B.Sc
- Alma mater: University of Calcutta; Jadavpur University
- Profession: Advocate

Akhruzzaman (born 24 November 1964) is an Indian politician and advocate from West Bengal, who served as Minister of State of Power of West Bengal from 2021-26. A member of Trinamool Congress, he is a member of West Bengal Legislative Assembly from Raghunathganj constituency in Murshidabad district since 2011. On, 3rd June 2026, he was appointed the chief whip of the Trinamool Congress legislative party, which was mostly in rebellion against the party leadership.

== Early life and education ==
Akhruzzaman was born on 24 November 1964 at Kantakhali to Habibur Rahaman and Jubada Bibi. He earned an LLB degree from Calcutta University in 1988, B.Ed. From Jadavpur University in 1989, B.Sc. from City College Under Calcutta University in 1984.

== Career ==
Akhruzzaman was a member of Indian National Congress. He is an advocate in Calcutta High Court. In 2018, he joined TMC. In 2021, he was re-elected from Raghunathganj seat with a margin of 23786 votes.

In 2026 he was re-elected from Raghunathganj, but after the BJP's victory overall he joined the rebel TMC camp led by Ritabrata Banerjee which staked its claim to be the 'real' Trinamool Congress. He was appointed Chief Whip of the Opposition for the rebel faction. He was present when the rebel faction took over the TMC headquarters on 3rd July 2026.
