= Abul Hasnat Khan =

Indian politician (1946–2021)

Member of the Indian Parliament for Jangipur
- In office 1998-2004
- Preceded by: Mohammad Idris Ali
- Succeeded by: Pranab Mukherjee

MLA for Farakka
- In office 1977 - 1996
- Preceded by: Jerat Ali
- Succeeded by: Mainul Haque

Personal details
- Born: Dumka
- Party: Communist Party of India (Marxist)
- Spouse: Rokea Khanam

Abul Hasnat Khan (5 December 1946 - 30 April 2021) was an Indian politician belonging to the Communist Party of India (Marxist) (CPM). He is a four-time MLA and two-time MP.

== Early life ==
Son of Muslim Ali Khan and Dilafroze Khanam, Abul Hasnat Khan was born on 5 December 1946 at Dumka, then in Bihar. A post graduate degree holder in history. He was educated at the University of Calcutta and Rabindra Bharati University. He married Rokea Khanam in 1965, and they had two sons and three daughters.

== Political career ==
Abul Hasnat Khan won from Farakka (Vidhan Sabha constituency) in 1977, 1982, 1987 and 1991.

He successfully contested from Jangipur (Lok Sabha constituency) in 1998 and 1999.

He took part in active politics from a young age and became a whole-time worker of CPI(M) in 1970.

Khan died from COVID-19 in 2021 at the age of 78.
