= Abdul Aziz Doctor =

Indian politician (born 1996)

Abdul Aziz
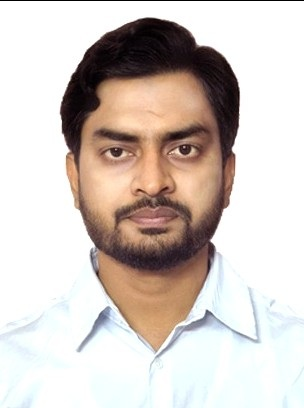
- Abdul Aziz in 2026

Member of the West Bengal Legislative Assembly
- Incumbent
- Assumed office 6 May 2026
- Preceded by: Mohammad Ali
- Constituency: Lalgola

Personal details
- Education: MD Paediatrics at WBUHS
- Profession: Doctor, politician, social worker

Abdul Aziz (born 1996) is an Indian politician from West Bengal. He is a member of the West Bengal Legislative Assembly from the Lalgola Assembly constituency in Murshidabad district representing the Democratic Trinamool Congress.

== Early life and education ==
Aziz is from Raghunathganj, Murshidabad district, West Bengal. He is the son of Md Ishaque. He completed his MD Paediatrics at West Bengal University of Health Sciences (WBUHS) in 2025. He is a Paediatician and his wife is a dermatologist. He declared assets worth Rs.7 crore in his affidavit to the Election Commission of India.

== Career ==
Aziz won the Lalgola Assembly constituency representing the All India Trinamool Congress in the 2026 West Bengal Legislative Assembly election. He polled votes and defeated his nearest rival, Md. Touhidur Rahaman of the Indian National Congress, by a margin of 18,969 votes.
