= Jangipur Road railway station =

Railway station in West Bengal, India

JANGIPUR ROAD
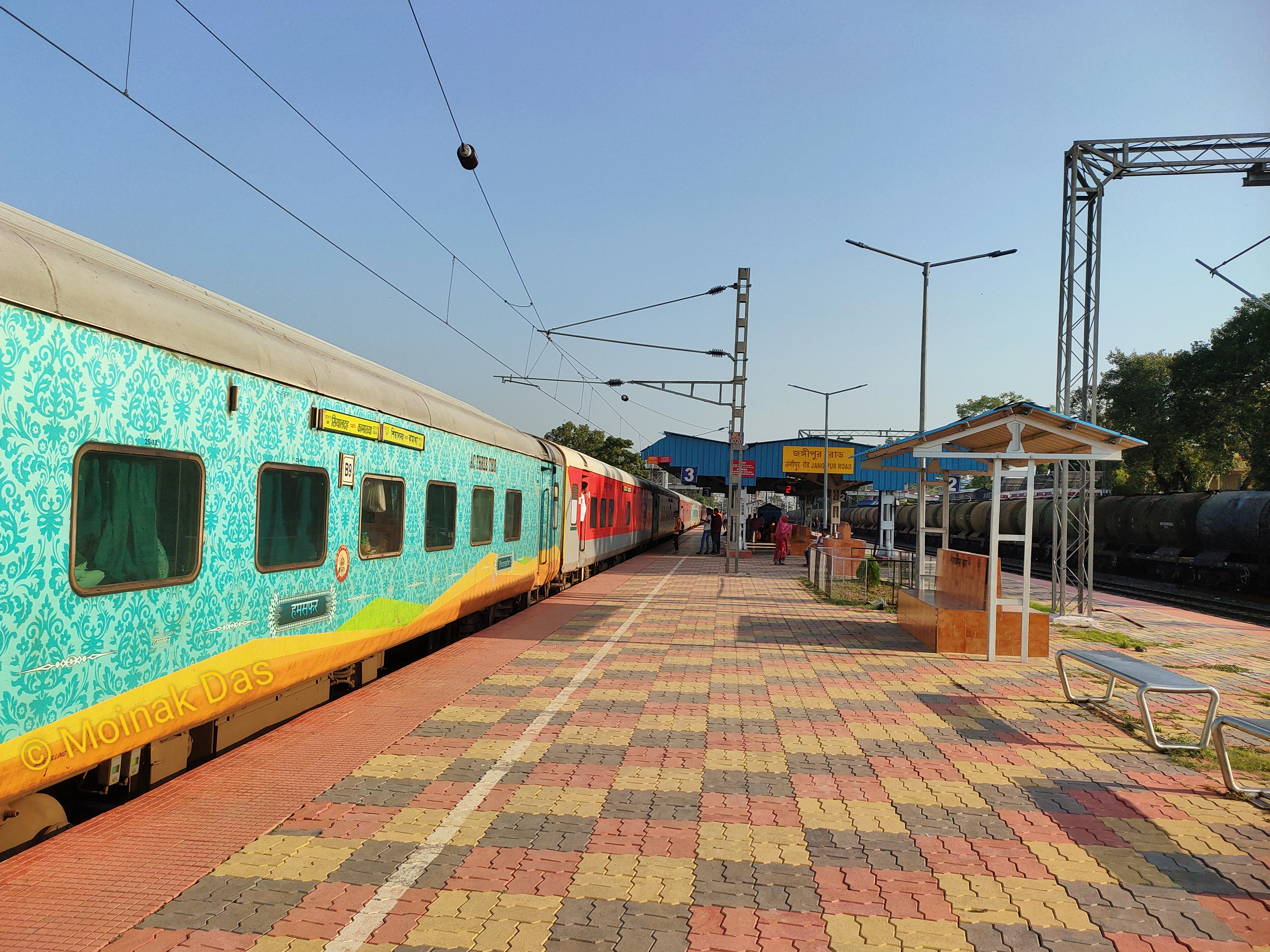
- Kamakhya Sealdah Humsafar Express having its scheduled stoppage at Jangipur Road station

General information
- Location: Station Road, Raghunathganj, Murshidabad district, West Bengal; India
- Coordinates: 24°16′24″N 88°13′36″E
- Elevation: 30 m (98 ft)
- System: Express train and Passenger train station
- Owner: Indian Railways
- Operator: Eastern Railway zone
- Lines: Howrah-NJP Loop Line; Barharwa–Azimganj–Katwa loop
- Platforms: 3
- Tracks: 4

Construction
- Structure type: Standard (on-ground station)
- Parking: Available

Other information
- Status: Active
- Station code: JRLE
- Zone(s): Eastern Railway zone
- Division(s): Malda

History
- Opened: 1913
- Former names: East Indian Railway Company

Services
Preceding station	Indian Railways	Following station
Gankar towards Katwa Junction	Eastern Railway zone Barharwa–Azimganj–Katwa loop	Ahiran towards Barharwa Junction
Location

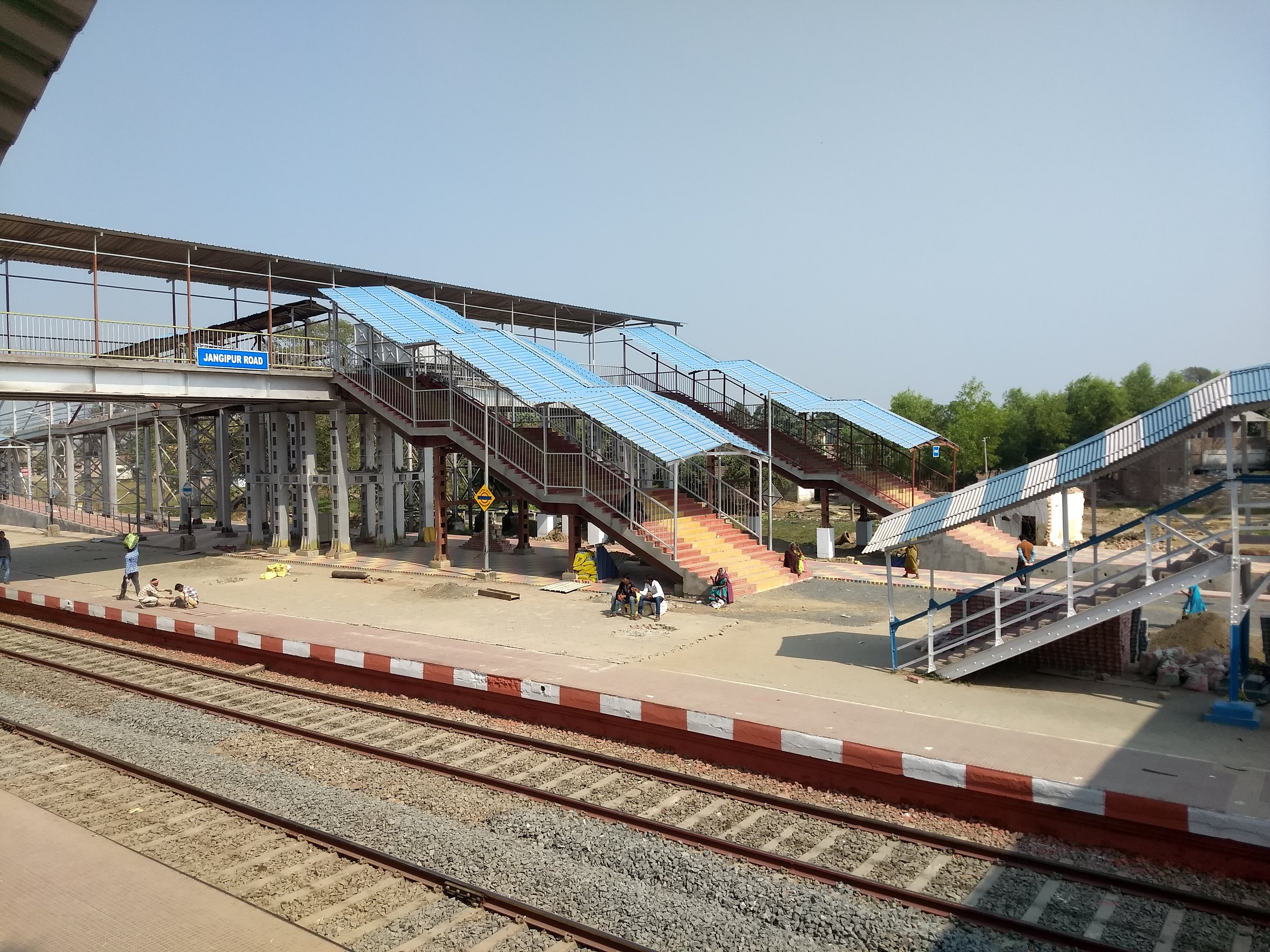
Full view of Jangipur Station

Jangipur Road is a railway station of Malda railway division of Eastern Railway zone. The station falls on the Barharwa–Azimganj–Katwa loop line. It is situated at Station Road, Raghunathganj of Murshidabad district in the Indian state of West Bengal.

== Revenue ==
Revenue Details of Jangipur Road Station for 2024–25
Category	Revenue (INR)	Approximate Value
Reservation Tickets – PRS	₹34,257,418	Nearly ₹3.43 crore
Unreserved Tickets – UTS	₹45,969,365	Nearly ₹4.60 crore
Total (PRS + UTS)	₹80,226,783	Nearly ₹8.02 crore

== History ==
In 1913, the Bandel–Katwa Railway constructed a 5 ft 6 in (1,676 mm) broad gauge line from Bandel to Katwa, and the Barharwa–Azimganj–Katwa Railway constructed the 5 ft 6 in (1,676 mm) broad gauge Barharwa–Azimganj–Katwa loop. With the construction of the Farakka Barrage and opening of the railway bridge in 1971, the railway communication picture of this line were completely changed. Total 32 trains including few passenger and express trains stop at Jangipur Road railway station. The distance between Jangipur Road and Howrah railway station is approximately 252 km.

== Heritage station ==
Considering the contribution of Jangipur in the development of the railways in India, the Malda Division of Eastern Railway has renovated the Jangipur station as a heritage station to bring back its past glory. But the historic toll tax office, which was once the largest revenue collection centre in the country, has been submerged by the Ganga after erosion of the banks. Mr. Prashant Kumar Mishra, Chief Workshop Engineer of Eastern Railway, who is also holding the additional charge of DRM of Malda Division, said on 14 September 2019 that the Jangipur station building, the most well-known landmark of the area with its thick brick walls, high roof, arches, wooden window shades has been given a new lease of life after structural repairs. "It was painted in trade mark red colour and the renovated heritage station building is now the cynosure of all eyes", Mishra added. He further said directors of the East India Company were deeply convinced of the need of railways in India for mobilising its forces across the country. The company wanted to conduct detailed traffic surveys and explore financial viability before deciding to set up a railway network in India. The first report of the directors of East India Rail Company had made mention of two million tonnes of inland traffic between Calcutta, the N.W. and Jangipore Ghat that alone carried more than 7.96 lakh tonnes of goods. It was the toll record of Jangipur that paved the way for construction of the railway network by EIR in India. The official records of the collector of tolls at Jangipur mentioned that in 1844–45, on the Bhagarutty River boats passed through that branch of the river, containing 21,497,750 maunds, or taking 27 maunds to the ton, the tonnage of the laden cargo boats was 796,213 tonnes. G.Ashburner of Messers Macintyre and Company in his letter dated 2 September 1844 to R Macdonald Stephenson stated, "I am satisfied indeed after very careful enquiry and minute attention to the subject that no country in the world has ever offered so tempting a field for the investment of capital in railways as the Valley of Ganges from one extremity to the other." "I have searched for the toll house in the banks of river Ganges, but sadly it no longer exists as it is now lying submerged in the river after erosion", Mr Mishra added.

== Originating train ==
- 73151/52 Jangipur–Sealdah–Jangipur DEMU Passenger was introduced on 19 February 2012. Later it started to run as 03177/78 Jangipur–Sealdah–Jangipur MEMU Special w.e.f 30/03/2021.
- 73035/36 Jangipur–Katwa–Jangipur DEMU Passenger was introduced on 9 February 2014. Later this train was extended to Nimtita from Jangipur.

== Updates ==
- Railway Board approved the conversion of the 73151/52 Jangipur–Sealdah–Jangipur DEMU Passenger to Express category with ref of letter no. 2020/Chg./30/3/PT date of 20/10/2020.
- 03177/78 Jangipur–Sealdah–Jangipur MEMU Passenger Special has been introduced w.e.f 30/03/2021 to replace the 73151/52 Jangipur–Sealdah–Jangipur DEMU Passenger.
- 13177/78 Jangipur-Sealdah-Jangipur MEMU Express has been introduced without changing the existing stoppages & time table of 03177/78 Jangipur-Sealdah-Jangipur MEMU Passerser Special w.e.f 02/05/2022.
- 02517/18 Guwahati-Kolkata-Guwahati Summer Special Express, 03129/30 Sealdah-New Jalpaiguri-Sealdah Bi-weekly Summer Special, 02307/08 Howrah - New Jalpaiguri - Howrah Summer Special Express, 03101/02 Sealdah-Kamakhya-Sealdah Humsafar Express, 05639/40 Silchar-Kolkata-Silchar Special Express have been given stoppage at Jangipur station w.e.f 22/06/2022.

== Facilities ==
- Upper class waiting room
- Purified drinking water
- Ramp for disabled person
- Reservation Booking counter
- Food & tea stall
- Bike & car parking space

== Timetable of Jangipur Road station w.e.f 01/10/2022 ==
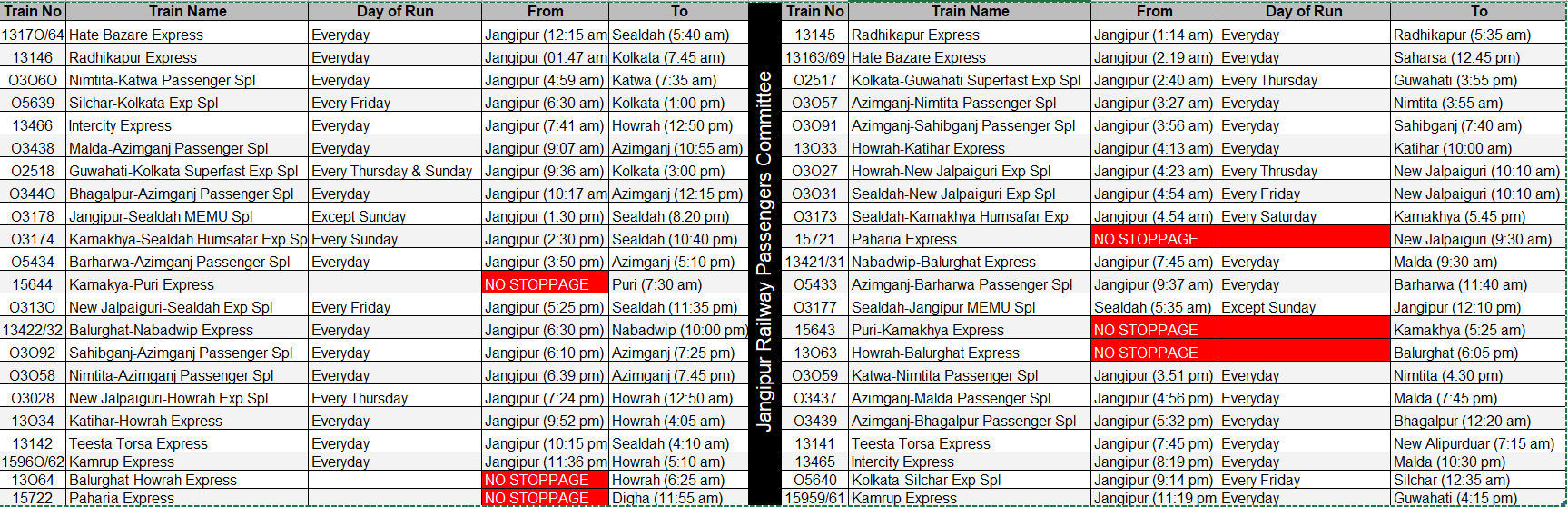

== Miscellaneous ==
Jangipur Railway Passengers Committee (JRPC) was formed in 2018. They initiated multiple activities for railway development across the Jangipur as well as Murshidabad district.

- On 26 January 2019, JRPC submitted their demands for new train from Jangipur to Kolkata in early morning and stoppages of all train at Jangipur to DRM Malda.
- Later on 8 February 2019, JRPC submitted their same demands to Mr. Harindra Rao, General Manager of Eastern Railway.
- JRPC also placed their demands to ex-Member of Parliament of Jangipur Mr. Abhijit Mukherjee on 17 February 2019.
- JRPC submitted the demands of new train and stoppages of trains and pending work of Nashipur Bridge to newly elected Member of Parliament of Jangipur constituency Mr. Khalilur Rahaman on 10 August 2019.
- On 11 November 2019, JRPC supported the Rail Roko movement by Murshidabad Railway Passengers Association for the demand of completing the work of Nashipur Rail link between Azimganj–Murshidabad.
- On 15 January 2021, JRPC participated in the blockade movement organized by Murshidabad Railway Passengers Association for the demand of completing the work of Nashipur Rail link between Azimganj–Murshidabad.
- On 19 June 2022, JRPC officially become a full time member of Eastern Railway Jatri Samonnoy Somiti in a conference held in Katwa.
- On 6 June 2022, CPTM/ER approved the stoppages of 05755/56, 02517/18, 02307/08, 03101/02, 03129/30 trains at Jangipur Road (JRLE) station based on a complaint received from Soumik Das (vide order no C.543/MLDT/Pt.X/BF dt 6.6.22).
- On 27 July 2022, a complaint raised by Soumik Das to Railway Board explaining the need of stoppages of 13063/64 & 15643/44 at Jangipur Road. CPTM/ER replied that the issue of stoppage of 15643/44 at Jangipur station has been sent to Railway Board for an approval.

== See also ==
- Khagraghat Road railway station
- Berhampore Court railway station
- New Farakka Junction railway station
- Azimganj Junction railway station
