= Abdus Sattar (Murshidabad politician) =

Indian politician

MLA
- In office 1967–1991
- Constituency: Lalgola

Minister for Agriculture, Law and Minor Irrigation
- In office 5 April 1972 – 21 June 1977

Personal details
- Born: 5 June 1925
- Died: 28 February 1991 (aged 65)
- Party: Indian National Congress
- Children: Abu Hena

Abdus Sattar (5 June 1925 - 28 February 1991) is an Indian National Congress politician, seven-time MLA and cabinet minister in the state of West Bengal.

== Early life ==
Abdus Sattar, son of Kalimuddin Biswas, was born at Lalgola in Murshidabad district on 5 June 1925. He did his post-graduation and degree in law from the University of Calcutta.

== Political career ==
In 1965, he was leader of the Congress Party in the West Bengal Legislative Council. He won from the Lalgola (Vidhan Sabha constituency) in 1967, 1969, 1971, 1972, 1977, 1982 and 1987.

He was in the UDF ministries in 1969 and 1971. In 1972, he was minister for agriculture, law and minor irrigation in the Siddhartha Shankar Ray ministry. He was the leader of the opposition in the assembly from 1982 to 1991.

== Death ==
He died on 28 February 1991. After his death, his son, Abu Hena, continued to contest successfully the Lalgola seat.
