= Lalgola Assembly constituency =

Lalgola
- Constituency No. 61 for the West Bengal Legislative Assembly
- Interactive Map Outlining Lalgola Assembly Constituency

Constituency details
- Country: India
- Region: East India
- State: West Bengal
- District: Murshidabad
- Lok Sabha constituency: Jangipur
- Established: 1951
- Total electors: 234,381
- Reservation: None

Member of Legislative Assembly
- 18th West Bengal Legislative Assembly
- Incumbent Abdul Aziz
- Party: DTC
- Elected year: 2026

Lalgola Assembly constituency is an assembly constituency in Murshidabad district in the Indian state of West Bengal.

== Overview ==
As per orders of the Delimitation Commission, No. 61 Lalgola Assembly constituency covers Airmari Krishnapur, Bahadurpur, Bilbora Kopra, Dewansarai, Jasaitala, Kalmegha, Lalgola, Manikchak, Nashipur, Paikpara and Ramchandrapur gram panchayats of Lalgola community development block and Kantanagar gram panchayat of Bhagabangola I community development block.

Lalgola Assembly constituency is part of No. 9 Jangipur Lok Sabha constituency. It was earlier part of Murshidabad (Lok Sabha constituency) till 2009.

== Members of the Legislative Assembly ==
Year	Name	Party
1951	Syed Kazim Ali Mirza	Indian National Congress
1957	Syed Kazim Ali Mirza	Indian National Congress
1962	Syed Kazim Ali Mirza	Indian National Congress
1967	Abdus Sattar	Indian National Congress
1969	Abdus Sattar	Indian National Congress
1971	Abdus Sattar	Indian National Congress
1972	Abdus Sattar	Indian National Congress
1977	Abdus Sattar	Indian National Congress
1982	Abdus Sattar	Indian National Congress
1987	Abdus Sattar	Indian National Congress
1991	Abu Hena	Indian National Congress
1996	Abu Hena	Indian National Congress
2001	Abu Hena	Indian National Congress
2006	Abu Hena	Indian National Congress
2011	Abu Hena	Indian National Congress
2016	Abu Hena	Indian National Congress
2021	Ali Mohammad	Trinamool Congress
2026	Abdul Aziz	Trinamool Congress

== Election results ==
Vote share of Winning candidates
2026	37.72%
2021	56.64%
2016	60.56%
2011	51.97%
2006	49.24%
2001	51.95%
1996	50.42%
1991	48.48%
1987	49.75%
1982	56.31%
1977	58.99%
1972	59.60%
1971	44.21%
1969	59.87%
1967	69.24%
1962	56.99%
1957	50.09%
1951	67.18%

=== 2026 ===
2026 West Bengal Legislative Assembly election: Lalgola
Party	Candidate	Votes	%	±%
AITC	Abdul Aziz	67,954	37.72	▼18.92
INC	Touhidur Rahaman Suman	48,994	27.19	▲2.43
BJP	Amar Kumar Das	35,496	19.7	▲4.23
CPI(M)	Mohammad Babluzzaman	21,932	12.17	
AIMIM	Mohammad Tariq Aziz	2,319	1.29	
NOTA	None of the above	1,044	0.58	▼0.15
Majority		18,960	10.53	▼21.35
Turnout		180,167	96.69	▲15.44
AITC hold		Swing		

=== 2021 ===
In the 2021 election, Ali Mohammad of Trinamool Congress defeated his nearest rival Abu Hena of Indian National Congress.

West Bengal assembly elections, 2021: Lalgola
Party	Candidate	Votes	%	±%
AITC	Ali Mohammad	107,860	56.64	
INC	Abu Hena	47,153	24.76	−35.8
BJP	Kalpana Ghosh	29,464	15.47	+9.26
NOTA	None of the above	1,394	0.73	
Majority		60,707	31.88	
Turnout		190,438	81.25	
AITC gain from INC		Swing		

=== 2016 ===
2016 West Bengal Legislative Assembly election: Lalgola
Party	Candidate	Votes	%	±%
INC	Abu Hena	100,110	60.56	
AITC	Chand Mohammad	46,635	28.21	
BJP	Amar Kumar Das	9,938	6.01	
SDPI	Md. Sahabuddin	3,644	2.20	
NOTA	None of the Above	1,959	1.19	
BSP	Bharat Biswas	1,563	0.95	
SP	Prasanta Sarkar	1,463	0.88	
Majority		53,475	32.35	
Turnout		165,312	82.91	
INC hold		Swing		

=== 2011 ===
2011 West Bengal Legislative Assembly election: Lalgola
Party	Candidate	Votes	%	±%
INC	Abu Hena	74,317	51.97	
CPI(M)	Md Yean Ali	58,133	40.65	
SDPI	Babar Ali	4,778	3.34	
BJP	Amar Kumar Das	3,848	2.69	
BSP	Bharat Chandra Biswas	1,937	1.35	
Majority		16,184	11.32	
Turnout		143,013	88.69	
INC hold		Swing		

=== 2006 ===
2006 West Bengal Legislative Assembly election: Lalgola
Party	Candidate	Votes	%	±%
INC	Abu Hena	69,538	49.24	
CPI(M)	Jinnatunnesa Begam	63,201	44.75	
AITC	Subhasish Roy	3,819	2.70	
Independent	Babar Ali	2,728	1.93	
BSP	Bharat Chandra Biswas	1,941	1.37	
Majority		6,337	4.49	
Turnout				
INC hold		Swing		

=== 2001 ===
2001 West Bengal Legislative Assembly election: Lalgola
Party	Candidate	Votes	%	±%
INC	Abu Hena	62,034	51.95	
CPI(M)	Md. Johaque Ali	52,900	44.30	
BJP	Debasish Chandra Majumder	4,473	3.75	
Majority		9,134	7.65	
Turnout		119,407	76.60	
INC hold		Swing		

=== 1996 ===
1996 West Bengal Legislative Assembly election: Lalgola
Party	Candidate	Votes	%	±%
INC	Abu Hena	64,337	50.42	
CPI(M)	Md. Johaque Ali	55,650	43.61	
BJP	Sukumar Sarkar	6,208	4.86	
Independent	Khairul Alam	313	0.25	
Independent	Kanan Gopal Banerjee	296	0.23	
Independent	Ambujaksha Singha	295	0.23	
Independent	Ahmed Meraj	289	0.23	
Independent	Shibendra Narayan Chakraborty	219	0.17	
Majority		8,687	6.81	
Turnout		130,093	87.25	
INC hold		Swing		

=== 1991 ===
1991 West Bengal Legislative Assembly election: Lalgola
Party	Candidate	Votes	%	±%
INC	Abu Hena	49,598	48.48	
CPI(M)	Ali Johaque	41,186	40.26	
BJP	Ramesh Chandra Sinha	9,389	9.18	
CPI(M-L)	Meraj	810	0.79	
Independent	Sayeedur Rahaman	648	0.63	
Independent	Kabir Hussain	459	0.45	
Independent	Agarwala Sitaram	137	0.13	
IUML	Hazi Lal Mohammad	78	0.08	
Majority		8,412	8.22	
Turnout		104,550	80.26	
INC hold		Swing		

=== 1987 ===
1987 West Bengal Legislative Assembly election: Lalgola
Party	Candidate	Votes	%	±%
INC	Abdus Sattar	45,340	49.75	
CPI(M)	Yean Ali	43,737	47.99	
BJP	Ramesh Chandra Sinha	2,062	2.26	
Majority		1,603	1.76	
Turnout		92,426	81.03	
INC hold		Swing		

=== 1982 ===
1982 West Bengal Legislative Assembly election: Lalgola
Party	Candidate	Votes	%	±%
INC	Abdus Sattar	46,500	56.31	
CPI(M)	Yean Ali	35,380	42.84	
Independent	Niranjan Mookherjee	470	0.57	
Independent	Shyamsundar Bhattacharjee	230	0.28	
Majority		11,120	13.47	
Turnout		83,900	87.24	
INC hold		Swing		

=== 1977 ===
1977 West Bengal Legislative Assembly election: Lalgola
Party	Candidate	Votes	%	±%
INC	Abdus Sattar	31,144	58.99	
CPI(M)	Zainal Aabedin	9,929	18.81	
Independent	Ranendra Narayan Roy	5,646	10.69	
JP	Md. Samaun	4,975	9.42	
Independent	Ayesh Mohammad	669	1.27	
Independent	Bipul Kumar Sarkar	435	0.82	
Majority		21,215	40.18	
Turnout		53,972	69.30	
INC hold		Swing		

=== 1972 ===
1972 West Bengal Legislative Assembly election: Lalgola
Party	Candidate	Votes	%	±%
INC	Abdus Sattar	24,409	59.60	
CPI(M)	Md Majibur Rahman	13,018	31.78	
Independent	Jagannath Pandey	2,715	6.63	
IUML	Abdur Razzaque	815	1.99	
Majority		11,391	27.82	
Turnout		44,156	65.02	
INC hold		Swing		

=== 1971 ===
1971 West Bengal Legislative Assembly election: Lalgola
Party	Candidate	Votes	%	±%
INC	Abnus Sattar	13,377	44.21	
Independent	Md. Mozipur Rahman	8,536	28.21	
Independent	Maulana Usmangani	6,185	20.44	
Independent	Sachindra Nath Roy	1,352	4.47	
INC(O)	Manindra Nath Roy	806	2.66	
Majority		4,841	16.00	
Turnout		33,914	51.76	
INC hold		Swing		

=== 1969 ===
1969 West Bengal Legislative Assembly election: Lalgola
Party	Candidate	Votes	%	±%
INC	Abdus Sattar	25,442	59.87	
Independent	Syed Kazim Ali Meerza	13,327	31.36	
PML	A. K. Hazikul Alam	2,896	6.81	
ABJS	Haripada Sarkar	831	1.96	
Majority		12,115	28.51	
Turnout		44,086	68.66	
INC hold		Swing		

=== 1967 ===
1967 West Bengal Legislative Assembly election: Lalgola
Party	Candidate	Votes	%	±%
INC	A. Sattar	28,300	69.24	
Independent	S. Ali	10,544	25.80	
Independent	P. N. Roy	2,028	4.96	
Majority		17,756	43.44	
Turnout		43,537	68.06	
INC hold		Swing		

=== 1962 ===
1962 West Bengal Legislative Assembly election: Lalgola
Party	Candidate	Votes	%	±%
INC	Syed Kazim Ali Mirza	16,506	56.99	
Independent	Mohammad Sajjad Ali	12,458	43.01	
Majority		4,048	13.98	
Turnout		30,809	45.83	
INC hold		Swing		

=== 1957 ===
1957 West Bengal Legislative Assembly election: Lalgola
Party	Candidate	Votes	%	±%
INC	Syed Kazem Ali Meerza	15,339	50.09	
Independent	Abdus Sattar	14,158	46.24	
Independent	Dwaijapada Sarkar	1,123	3.67	
Majority		1,181	3.85	
Turnout		30,620	51.78	
INC hold		Swing		

=== 1951 ===
1951 West Bengal Legislative Assembly election: Lalgola
Party	Candidate	Votes	%	±%
INC	Kazeemali Meerza	19,514	67.18	
Independent	Sajjad Ali	7,491	25.79	
KMPP	Abdur Rouf	1,442	4.96	
FBL(RG)	Binay Kumar Mitra	350	1.20	
Independent	Ranendra Nath Pandey	250	0.86	
Majority		12,023	41.39	
Turnout		29,047	50.83	
INC win (new seat)				
