= Jangipur, Murshidabad =

Jangipur Jahangirpur
- City
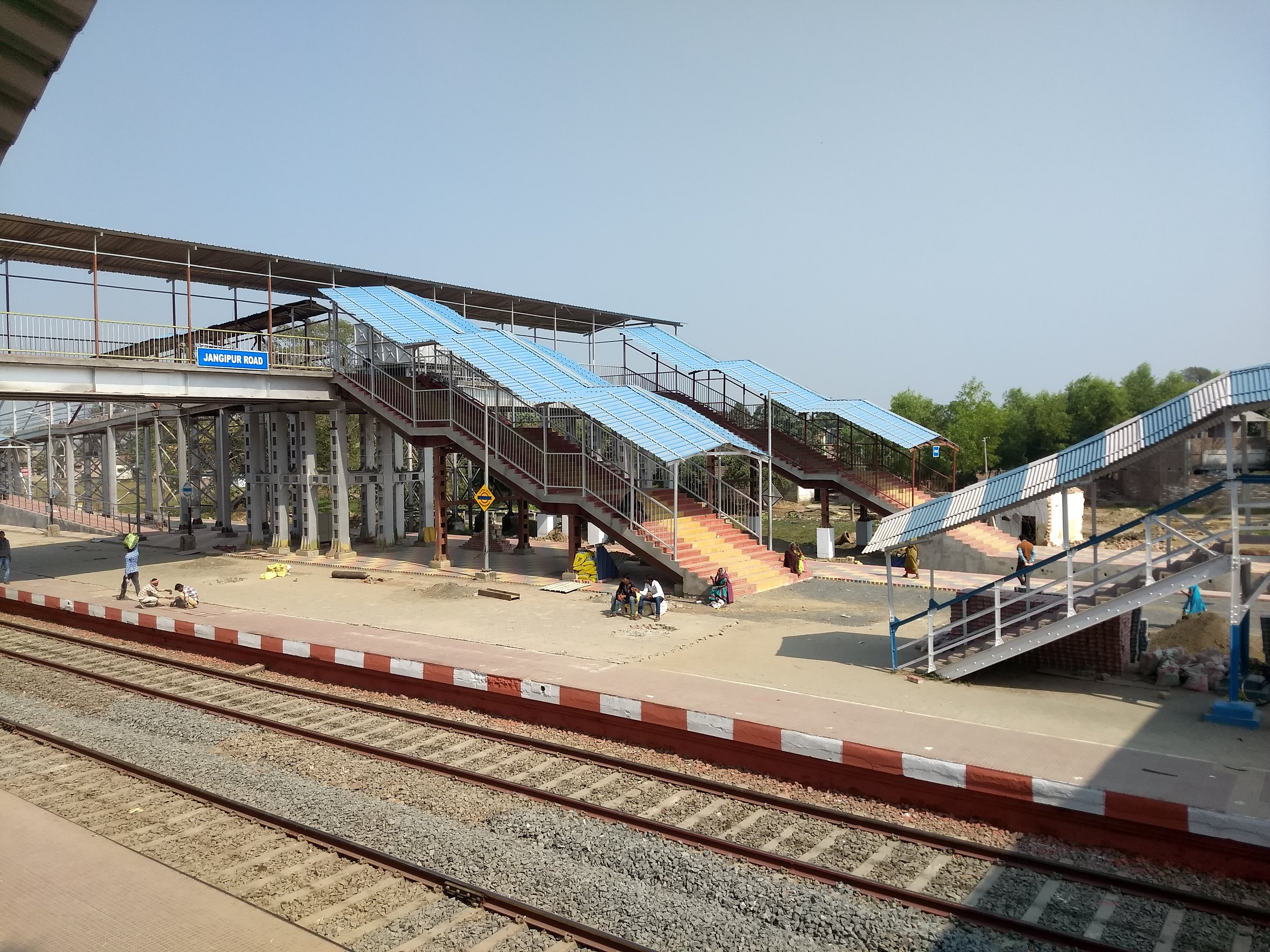
- Jangipur Road railway station

- Location in West Bengal, India Jangipur (India)
- Coordinates: 24.4691°N 88.1032°E
- Country: India
- State: West Bengal
- District: Murshidabad
- Jangipur Municipality (JM): 1869

Government
  - Type: Municipality
  - Body: Jangipur Municipality
  - Administrative Division: Malda

Area
  - City: 8.20 km^{2} (3.17 sq mi)
- Elevation: 11 m (36 ft)

Population (2011)
  - City: 88,165
  - Density: 10,800/km^{2} (27,800/sq mi)
  - Metro: 122,875

Languages
  - Official: Bengali, English
- Time zone: UTC+5:30 (IST)
- ISO 3166 code: IN-WB
- Lok Sabha constituency: Jangipur
- Vidhan Sabha constituency: Jangipur
- Website: jangipurmunicipality.org

Jangipur is a city and a municipality in Murshidabad district in the state of West Bengal, India. It is the headquarters of the Jangipur subdivision. It is situated on the banks of the Bhagirathi. Jangipur is an old town having reference from the historical period of Moghul emperor Jahangir when an army camp was established here.

Cities, towns and locations in the southern portion of Jangipur subdivision, Murshidabad district (including Suti I, Raghunathganj I, Raghunathganj II, Sagardighi CD blocks)
M: municipal town, CT: census town, R: rural/ urban centre, F: Facility
Abbreviation- TPS: Thermal Power Station, AMU: Aligarh Muslim University
Owing to space constraints in the small map, the actual locations in a larger map may vary slightly

== Location ==
Jangipur is located at 24.4691°N 88.1032°E. It has an average elevation of 11 metres (36 feet).

== Jangipur Barrage ==
There is a 1 km long barrage across the Bhagirathi at Jangipur.

== Area overview ==
Jangipur subdivision is crowded with 52 census towns and as such it had to be presented in two location maps. One of the maps can be seen alongside. The subdivision is located in the Rarh region that is spread over from adjoining Santhal Pargana division of Jharkhand. The land is slightly higher in altitude than the surrounding plains and is gently undulating. The river Ganges, along with its distributaries, is prominent in both the maps. At the head of the subdivision is the 2,245 m long Farakka Barrage, one of the largest projects of its kind in the country. Murshidabad district shares with Bangladesh a porous international border which is notoriously crime prone (partly shown in this map). The subdivision has two large power plants - the 2,100 MW Farakka Super Thermal Power Station and the 1,600 MW Sagardighi Thermal Power Station. According to a 2016 report, there are around 1,000,000 (1 million/ ten lakh) workers engaged in the beedi industry in Jangipur subdivision. 90% are home-based and 70% of the home-based workers are women. As of 2013, an estimated 2.4 million people reside along the banks of the Ganges alone in Murshidabad district. Severe erosion occurs along the banks.

Note: The two maps present some of the notable locations in the subdivision. All places marked in the maps are linked in the larger full screen maps.

== History ==
The city is said to have been founded by the Mughal emperor Jahangir. During Moghul period, it was known as Jahangirpur and an army camp was established in this place. During the early years of British rule (then it was known as Jungypore, Jungypoor etc.) it was an important centre of the Silk Trade and the site of East India Company's commercial residencies. The Jungypore silk was very famous during that time period. It was also an important centre of indigo cultivation during the later years of Company rule. In the early twentieth century, it was best known as the toll station for registering all the traffic on the Bhagirathi. But now the trade and traffic has fallen and much of the town has been swept away by the river Bhagirathi.

The subdivisional courts and offices formerly stood on the east bank of the Bhagirathi, and were moved to the west bank in consequence of the encroachments of the river. This quarter of the town is called Raghunathganj and is within municipal limits.

Here there is an old mosque with an inscription saying that it was built by Saiyad Kasim and containing a chronogram, which gives 1075 A. H., or 1664 A. D., as the date.

Sir Ashley Eden, Lieutenant Governor of Bengal from 1877 to 1882, was once stationed at Jangipur and transferred the subdivisional headquarters there from Aurangabad in 1856.

North of Jangipur is Giria, where two important battles were fought. One between Alivardi Khan and Sarfaraz Khan on April 29, 1740, and the other between the English under Major Adams and the troop of Mir Qasim in 1763.

In 1858, W. J. Herschel, while serving as Magistrate at Jangipur, first began the use of fingerprints for identification at the beginning of a road building project when he made a supplier named Rajyadhar Konai sign the contract with the impression of his right hand.

== Demographics ==
In the 2011 census, Jangipur Urban Agglomeration had a population of 122,875, out of which 62,734 were males and 60,141 were females. The 0–6 years population was 16,299. Effective literacy rate for the 7+ population was 75.71 per cent.

As of 2001 India census, Jangipur had a population of 74,464. Males constitute 51% of the population and females 49%. Jangipur has an average literacy rate of 62%, higher than the national average of 59.5%: male literacy is 68%, and female literacy is 56%. In Jangipur, 15% of the population is under 6 years of age.

== Infrastructure ==
According to the District Census Handbook, Murshidabad, 2011, Jangipur covered an area of 8.2 km^{2}. The protected water-supply involved overhead tank etc. It had 6,968 domestic electric connections. Among the medical facilities it had 1 hospital (with 250 beds), 3 charitable hospitals/ nursing homes, 100 medicine shops. Among the educational facilities, it had 57 primary schools, 6 middle schools, 5 secondary schools, 5 senior secondary schools, 1 general degree college. It had 46 non-formal education centres (Sarva Shiksha Abhiyan). Among the social, recreational & cultural facilities it had 1 working women's hostel, 1 stadium, 1 cinema theatre, 1 auditorium/ community hall, 3 public libraries, 3 reading rooms. It produced beedi, napkins. It had the branch offices of 7 nationalised banks, 1 private commercial bank, 1 cooperative bank.

== Transport ==
Jangipur is well connected with Kolkata and district headquarter Baharampur via NH 12. A railway station, (In Azimganj - Farakka line) Jangipur Road railway station is situated in Raghunathganj. Many express and passengers trains pass regularly over the city. Raghunathganj is a twin town of Jangipur opposite of the Bhagirathi River.

== Education ==
Jangipur College was established in 1950 at Jangipur. Affiliated to the University of Kalyani it offers honours courses in Bengali, English, Sanskrit, history, geography, philosophy, political science, economics, physics, chemistry, mathematics, botany, zoology and accountancy. From 2016 to 2017, it is offering post-graduate courses in Bengali, English, history and education in distance mode. There is a Management Development Institute of Murshidabad which got operational from 2014. This was inaugurated by then Indian President Shri Pranab Mukherjee. This institute is one of the premier educational institution of India.

The municipality of Jangipur also has a Medical College called Jakir Hossain Medical College And Research Institute (JHMCRI) producing MBBS doctors and is affiliated by the West Bengal University of Health Sciences (WBUHS). The college was inaugurated in the year 2024 by the then MLA of Jangipur (Mr. Jakir Hossain) and is currently functioning as well in the locality of Raghunathganj. The college is based upon a Public Private Partnership (PPP Model) with the Jangipur Super-Speciality Government Hospital.

- Mahasweta Devi Memorial Academy in 2018.
- Jangipur Government Polytechnic (2015), recognized by the All India Council for Technical Education.
- Jakir Hossain Medical College And Research Institute in 2024, affiliated by WBUHS.

== Healthcare ==
Jangipur Subdivisional Hospital at Jangipur functions with 250 beds.

Jangipur Superspeciality Hospital is functional.

== Notable residents ==
- Sarat Chandra Pandit
