= Raghunathganj Assembly constituency =

Raghunathganj
- Constituency No. 59 for the West Bengal Legislative Assembly
- Interactive Map Outlining Raghunathganj Assembly Constituency

Constituency details
- Country: India
- Region: East India
- State: West Bengal
- District: Murshidabad
- Lok Sabha constituency: Jangipur
- Established: 2011
- Total electors: 250,862
- Reservation: None

Member of Legislative Assembly
- 18th West Bengal Legislative Assembly
- Incumbent Akhruzzaman
- Party: DTC
- Alliance: None
- Elected year: 2026

Raghunathganj Assembly constituency is an assembly constituency in Murshidabad district in the Indian state of West Bengal.

== Overview ==
As per orders of the Delimitation Commission, No. 59 Raghunathganj Assembly constituency covers Raghunathganj II community development block, Nurpur gram panchayat of Suti I community development block and Maiya gram panchayat of Lalgola community development block.

Raghunathganj Assembly constituency is part of No. 9 Jangipur Lok Sabha constituency.

== Members of the Legislative Assembly ==
Year	Member	Party
2011	Akhruzzaman	Indian National Congress
2016	Akhruzzaman	Indian National Congress
2021	Akhruzzaman	Trinamool Congress
2026	Akhruzzaman	Trinamool Congress

== Election results ==
=== 2026 ===
2026 West Bengal Legislative Assembly election: Raghunathganj
Party	Candidate	Votes	%	±%
AITC	Akhruzzaman	88,909	45.65	▼20.94
INC	Nasir Saikh	48,354	24.83	▲18.11
BJP	Surojit Poddar	35,184	18.06	▲3.09
CPI(M)	Abul Hasnat	12,985	6.67	
AIMIM	Mohammad Imran Solanki	5,885	3.02	
NOTA	None of the above	1,953	1.0	▼0.54
Majority		40,555	20.82	▼30.8
Turnout		194,765	97.1	▲20.77
AITC hold		Swing		

=== 2021 ===
2021 West Bengal Legislative Assembly election: Raghunathganj
Party	Candidate	Votes	%	±%
AITC	Akhruzzaman	126,834	66.59	▲33.65
BJP	Golam Modaswer	28,521	14.97	▲8.9
Independent	Nasir Saikh	16,244	8.53	
INC	Abul Kashem Biswas	12,799	6.72	▼40.54
NOTA	None of the above	2,938	1.54	
Majority		98,313	51.62	
Turnout		190,478	76.33	
AITC gain from INC		Swing		

=== 2016 ===
2016 West Bengal state assembly election: Raghunathganj
Party	Candidate	Votes	%	±%
INC	Akhruzzaman	78,497	47.26	▼3.73
AITC	Abul Kasem Molla	54,711	32.94	New entry
RSP	Abul Hasnat	16,474	9.92	▼30.46
BJP	Golam Modashbar	10,073	6.07	▲3.29
SDPI	Mojibur Rahaman	2,454	1.48	▼2.68
NOTA	None of the above	2,396	1.44	New entry
SUCI(C)	Rabiul Alam	1,477	0.89	▼0.71
Majority		23,786	14.32	▲3.71
Turnout		1,66,082	79.85	▼6.90
INC hold		Swing		

=== 2011 ===
2011 West Bengal Legislative Assembly election: Raghunathganj
Party	Candidate	Votes	%	±%
INC	Akhruzzaman	74,683	50.99	
RSP	Abul Hasnat	59,143	40.38	
SDPI	Mohammad Jakir Hossain	6,093	4.16	
BJP	Sougata Singha Roy	4,066	2.78	
SUCI(C)	Rabiul Alam	2,493	1.70	
Majority		15,540	10.61	
Turnout		1,46,478	86.75	
INC win (new seat)				
