= Jangipur Lok Sabha constituency =

Lok Sabha Constituency in West Bengal

Coordinates: 24°32′N 88°04′E

Jangipur WB-9
- Lok Sabha constituency
- Interactive Map Outlining Jangipur Lok Sabha Constituency

Constituency details
- Country: India
- Region: East India
- State: West Bengal
- Assembly constituencies: Suti; Jangipur; Raghunathganj; Sagardighi; Lalgola; Nabagram; Khargram
- Established: 1967-present
- Total electors: 1,391,656
- Reservation: None

Member of Parliament
- 18th Lok Sabha
- Incumbent Khalilur Rahaman
- Party: NCPI
- Alliance: NDA
- Elected year: 2024

Jangipur Lok Sabha constituency is a parliamentary constituency in Murshidabad district of West Bengal, India. All the seven assembly segments of No. 9 Jangipur Lok Sabha constituency are in Murshidabad district.

The most successful party in the Lok Sabha elections
1. Communist Party of India (Marxist) (41.2%)
2. Indian National Congress (35.3%)
3. Trinamool Congress (23.5%)
4. 0.00%

== Assembly segments ==
Parliamentary constituencies in West Bengal - 1. Cooch Behar, 2. Alipurduars, 3. Jalpaiguri, 4. Darjeeling, 5. Raiganj, 6. Balurghat, 7. Maldaha Uttar, 8. Maldaha Dakshin, 9. Jangipur, 10. Baharampur, 11. Murshidabad, 12. Krishnanagar, 13. Ranaghat, 14. Bangaon, 15. Barrackpore, 16. Dum Dum, 17. Barasat, 18. Basirhat, 19. Jaynagar, 20. Mathurapur, 21. Diamond Harbour, 22. Jadavpur, 23. Kolkata Dakshin, 24. Kolkata Uttar, 25. Howrah, 26. Uluberia, 27. Serampore, 28. Hooghly, 29. Arambagh, 30. Tamluk, 31, Kanthi, 32. Ghatal, 33. Jhargram, 34. Medinipur, 35. Purulia, 36. Bankura, 37. Bishnupur, 38. Bardhaman Purba, 39. Bardhaman Durgapur, 40. Asansol, 41. Bolpur, 42. Birbhum

As per order of the Delimitation Commission in respect of the delimitation of constituencies in the West Bengal, parliamentary constituency no. 9 Jangipur is composed of the following segments from 2009:

#	Name	District	Member	Party	2024 Lead
57	Suti	Murshidabad	Emani Biswas	AITC	AITC
58	Jangipur	Murshidabad	Chitta Mukherjee	BJP	BJP
59	Raghunathganj	Murshidabad	Akhruzzaman	AITC	AITC
60	Sagardighi	Murshidabad	Bayron Biswas	AITC	AITC
61	Lalgola	Murshidabad	Abdul Aziz	AITC	INC
65	Nabagram (SC)	Murshidabad	Dilip Saha	BJP	AITC
66	Khargram (SC)	Murshidabad	Mitali Mal	BJP	AITC

In 2004 Jangipur Lok Sabha constituency was composed of the following assembly segments:Farakka (assembly constituency no. 50), Aurangabad (assembly constituency no. 51), Suti (assembly constituency no. 52), Sagardighi (SC) (assembly constituency no. 53), Jangipur (assembly constituency no. 54), Nabagram (assembly constituency no. 57), Khargram (SC) (assembly constituency no. 66)

== Members of Parliament ==
Year	Name	Party
1967	Lutfal Haque	Indian National Congress
1971	Lutfal Haque	Indian National Congress
1977	Sasanka Sekhar Sanyal	Communist Party of India (Marxist)
1980	Zainal Abedin	Communist Party of India (Marxist)
1984	Zainal Abedin	Communist Party of India (Marxist)
1989	Zainal Abedin	Communist Party of India (Marxist)
1991	Zainal Abedin	Communist Party of India (Marxist)
1996	Mohammad Idris Ali	Indian National Congress
1998	Abul Hasnat Khan	Communist Party of India (Marxist)
1999	Abul Hasnat Khan	Communist Party of India (Marxist)
2004	Pranab Mukherjee	Indian National Congress
2009	Pranab Mukherjee	Indian National Congress
2012^	Abhijit Mukherjee	Indian National Congress
2014	Abhijit Mukherjee	Indian National Congress
2019	Khalilur Rahaman	Trinamool Congress
2024	Khalilur Rahaman	Trinamool Congress
2026 (Note: Switched to NCPI as part of AITC Rebels in Lok Sabha.)	Khalilur Rahaman	Nationalist Citizens Party of India

== Election results ==
Vote share of Winning candidates
2024	39.75%
2019	43.15%
2014	33.80%
2012 (By-Poll)	39.01%
2009	54.24%
2004	48.88%
1999	45.47%
1998	47.94%
1996	45.56%
1991	42.61%
1989	43.06%
1984	48.40%
1980	54.79%
1977	48.85%
1971	34.66%
1967	46.30%

=== 2024 ===
2024 Indian general election: Jangipur
Party	Candidate	Votes	%	±%
AITC	Khalilur Rahaman	544,427	39.75	▼3.40
INC	Mortaza Hossain Bakul	427,790	31.23	▲11.62
BJP	Dhananjay Ghosh	340,814	24.88	▲0.58
NOTA	None of the above	17,158	1.25	▲0.38
Majority		116,637		
Turnout		1,369,633	75.72	▼5.0
AITC hold		Swing		

=== 2019 ===
2019 Indian general election: Jangipur
Party	Candidate	Votes	%	±%
AITC	Khalilur Rahaman	562,838	43.15	
BJP	Mafuja Khatun	317,056	24.30	
INC	Abhijit Mukherjee	255,836	19.61	
CPI(M)	Md. Zulfikar Ali	95,501	7.32	
NOTA	None of the Above	11,355	0.87	
IND	Avijit Khamaru	5,790	0.44	
OTH	6 Other Party Candidates	56,128	4.30	
Majority		245,782	18.85	
Turnout		1,304,629	80.72	
Swing to AITC from INC		Swing		

=== 2014 ===
2014 Indian general election: Jangipur
Party	Candidate	Votes	%	±%
INC	Abhijit Mukherjee	378,201	33.80	
CPI(M)	Muzaffar Hossain	370,040	33.07	
AITC	Sk Nurul Islam	207,455	18.54	
BJP	Samrat Ghosh	96,751	8.65	
SDPI	Md. Sahabuddin	17,257	1.54	
NOTA	None of the Above	11,079	0.99	
IND	Abhijit Sarkar	10,055	0.90	
OTH	5 Other Party Candidates	28,246	2.52	
Majority		8,161	0.73	
Turnout				
INC hold		Swing		

=== By election 2012 ===
Bye-election, 2012: Jangipur
Party	Candidate	Votes	%	±%
INC	Abhijit Mukherjee	332,919	39.01	−15.23
CPI(M)	Muzaffar Hussain	330,383	38.71	−1.81
BJP	Sudhansu Biswas	85,887	10.06	+7.73
WPOI	Raisuddin Baidya	41,620	4.90	+4.90
SDPI	Tayedul Islam	24,691	2.90	+2.90
Majority		2,536	0.30	−13.42
Turnout		8,53,413	68.73	−17.22
INC hold		Swing		

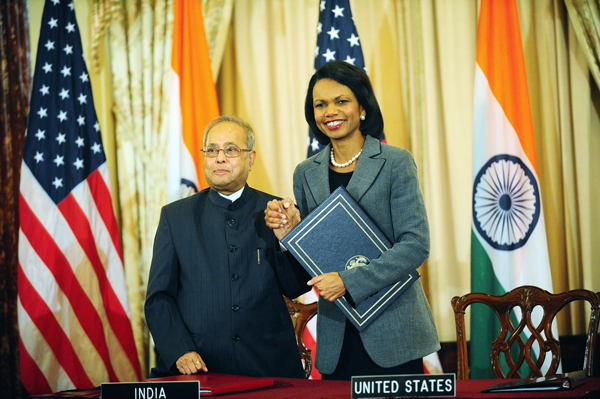
Finance Minister of India Pranab Mukherjee played a central role in the implementation of the Indo-US civilian nuclear agreement.

=== 2009 ===
General Election, 2009: Jangipur
Party	Candidate	Votes	%	±%
INC	Pranab Mukherjee	506,749	54.24	+5.36
CPI(M)	Mriganka Sekhar Bhattacharya	378,600	40.52	−4.18
BJP	Debashish Majumdar	21,791	2.33	+2.33
AUDF	Zamirul Hassan	19,000	2.03	+2.03
IND	Tapas Saha	8,141	0.87	+0.87
Majority		128,149	13.72	+9.54
Turnout		9,34,281	85.95	+4.34
INC hold		Swing	+5.36	

=== 2004 ===
2004 Indian general election: Jangipur
Party	Candidate	Votes	%	±%
INC	Pranab Mukherjee	431,647	48.88	
CPI(M)	Abul Hasnat Khan	394,787	44.70	
AITC	Shish Mohammad	19,725	2.23	
IND	Palash De	9,959	1.13	
BSP	Gour Pada Biswas Mallik	8,499	0.96	
IND	Abdus Sayeed	7,132	0.81	
IND	Tojibur Rahaman	3,997	0.45	
SP	Mohammad Abdur Rahaman	3,934	0.45	
IND	Abu Asim Siddique	3,448	0.39	
Majority		36,860	4.18	
Turnout		883,128		
Swing to INC from CPI(M)		Swing		

=== 1999 ===
1999 Indian general election: Jangipur
Party	Candidate	Votes	%	±%
CPI(M)	Abul Hasnat Khan	352,580	45.47	
INC	Mainul Haque	291,263	37.56	
AITC	Syed Mustaque Murshed	120,770	15.57	
IND	Dwarika Nath Das	6,074	0.78	
NCP	Utpal Majumdar	2,339	0.30	
BSP	Alam Khairul	1,857	0.24	
IND	Mihir Kumar Das	610	0.08	
Majority		61,317	7.91	
Turnout		785,797	72.28	
CPI(M) hold		Swing		

=== 1998 ===
1998 Indian general election: Jangipur
Party	Candidate	Votes	%	±%
CPI(M)	Abul Hasnat Khan	396,761	47.94	
INC	Abu Hasem Khan Chowdhury	324,260	39.18	
AITC	Sk Furkan	99,028	11.97	
IUML	Mosharaf Hossain	6,013	0.73	
IND	Rafique Sk	1,563	0.19	
Majority		72,501	8.76	
Turnout		840,406	78.46	
Swing to CPI(M) from INC		Swing		

=== 1996 ===
1996 Indian general election: Jangipur
Party	Candidate	Votes	%	±%
INC	Md. Idris Ali	392,942	45.56	
CPI(M)	Abedin Zainal	379,820	44.04	
BJP	Shyamal Gupta	66,095	7.66	
IND	Abdus Sayeed	8,255	0.96	
IND	Smt. Jahera Begum	5,137	0.60	
BMSM (Note: Bharatiya Minorities Suraksha Mahasangh)	Zakir Hossain	2,834	0.33	
IND	Dilip Das	1,986	0.23	
IUML	Md. Israil	1,735	0.20	
PBRML (Note: Pachim Banga Rajya Muslim League)	Abdul Hannan	1,545	0.18	
IND	Debabrata Gupta	1,405	0.16	
SAP	Anesur Rahaman	747	0.09	
Majority		13,122	1.52	
Turnout		887,589	84.76	
Swing to INC from CPI(M)		Swing		

=== 1991 ===
1991 Indian general election: Jangipur
Party	Candidate	Votes	%	±%
CPI(M)	Abedin Zainal	303,254	42.61	
INC	Mannan Hossain	256,615	36.05	
BJP	Dhannanjoy Das	131,071	18.42	
IND	Abdus Sayeed	6,735	0.95	
BSP	Rafiqul Islam	3,328	0.47	
IUML	Khairul Basar	3,232	0.45	
JP	Aynal Haque Choudhary	2,915	0.41	
IND	Mrinal Kanti Ghosh	2,659	0.37	
DMM (Note: All India Dalit Muslim Minorities Suraksha Mahasangh)	S. K. Amanullah Hazi	1,952	0.27	
Majority		46,639	6.56	
Turnout		728,077	77.15	
CPI(M) hold		Swing		

=== 1989 ===
1989 Indian general election: Jangipur
Party	Candidate	Votes	%	±%
CPI(M)	Abedin Zainal	309,798	43.06	
INC	Mohammad Sohrab	270,617	37.61	
BJP	Dhananjoy Das	82,675	11.49	
IUML	Samaun Biswas	43,008	5.98	
IND	Mosarraf Hossain	7,529	1.05	
IND	Abdus Sayeed	5,901	0.82	
Majority		39,181	5.45	
Turnout		732,851	78.60	
CPI(M) hold		Swing		

=== 1984 ===
1984 Indian general election: Jangipur
Party	Candidate	Votes	%	±%
CPI(M)	Abedin Zainal	283,977	48.40	
INC	Md. Sohorab	269,239	45.89	
BJP	Anima Basu	16,105	2.74	
SUCI(C)	Abdus Sayeed	8,486	1.45	
IND	Mrinal Kanti Ghose	3,233	0.55	
IND	Pramanik Sisir Kumar	2,393	0.41	
IUML	Mollah Ziaur	2,372	0.40	
IND	Sinha Dilip	931	0.16	
Majority		14,738	2.51	
Turnout		598,478	77.27	
CPI(M) hold		Swing		

=== 1980 ===
1980 Indian general election: Jangipur
Party	Candidate	Votes	%	±%
CPI(M)	Zainal Abedin	268,932	54.79	
INC(I)	Lutfal Haque	196,106	39.95	
SUCI(C)	Lakshmi Naryan Das	8,551	1.74	
JP	Krishnadas Chottopadhyay	6,485	1.32	
IND	Parichay Das Gupta	6,245	1.27	
INC(U)	Amiya Kumar Sinha Roy	4,531	0.92	
Majority		72,826	14.84	
Turnout		502,469	72.07	
CPI(M) hold		Swing		

=== 1977 ===
1977 Indian general election: Jangipur
Party	Candidate	Votes	%	±%
CPI(M)	Sasankasekher Sanyal	155,008	48.85	
INC	Lutfal Haque (Haji)	152,822	48.16	
IND	T. A. Nuran Nabi	6,761	2.13	
IND	Israil	2,700	0.85	
Majority		2,186	0.69	
Turnout		328,222	58.07	
Swing to CPI(M) from INC		Swing		

=== 1971 ===
1971 Indian general election: Jangipur
Party	Candidate	Votes	%	±%
INC	Lutfal Haque	104,170	34.66	
RSP	Barun Roy	54,814	18.24	
CPI(M)	Joynal Abedin	53,026	17.64	
IND	A. K. Hazikul Alam	44,211	14.71	
SUCI(C)	Dasgupta Sukomal	28,384	9.44	
INC(O)	Biswas Tanuran Nabi	8,403	2.80	
IND	Krishna Kripal Satiar	5,023	1.67	
IND	M. A. Hannan Alhaj	2,553	0.85	
Majority		49,356	16.42	
Turnout		317,319	57.00	
INC hold		Swing		

=== 1967 ===
1967 Indian general election: Jangipur
Party	Candidate	Votes	%	±%
INC	H. L. Haque	130,927	46.30	
IND	J. Gupta	79,238	28.02	
SWA	M. A. H. Alhaj	40,871	14.45	
Bangla Congress	T. A. N. Nabi	17,139	6.06	
IND	K. K. Satiar	10,128	3.58	
IND	F. Ali	4,457	1.58	
Majority		51,689	18.28	
Turnout		298,529	57.43	
INC win (new seat)				

== See also ==
- Jangipur
- List of constituencies of the Lok Sabha
