= Jangipur police district =

- Nickname: JPD
- Country: Jangipur India
- State: West Bengal
- Jangipur Police District: 1 January 2020

Government
  - Type: Police
  - Administrative District: Murshidabad district
  - Administrative Division: Malda
  - Headquarters: Raghunathganj

Demographics

Languages
  - Official: Bengali, English
- Time zone: UTC+5:30 (IST)
- PIN: 742225
- Website: www.jangipurpolicedistrict.org

Jangipur police district is a police district of Murshidabad district in the Indian state of West Bengal. It was established in September 2020.

== Geography ==
Murshidabad district is divided into two police districts. Jangipur subdivision is one of the seven blocks under Jangipur police district. This block is : 1. Farakka, 2. Samserganj, 3. Suti I, 4. Suti II, 5. Raghunathganj I, 6. Raghunathganj II, 7. Sagardighi.

=== Administrative units ===
Jangipur subdivision has 5 police stations, 7 community development blocks, 7 panchayat samitis, 61 gram panchayats, 561 mouzas, 420 inhabited villages, 2 municipalities and 52 census towns. The municipalities are: Jangipur and Dhulian. The census towns are: Farakka Barrage Township, Srimantapur (P), Benia Gram, Arjunpur, Sibnagar, Memrejpur, Pranpara, Mahadebnagar, Anup Nagar, Jaffrabad, Kankuria, Uttar Mahammadpur, Chachanda, Dhusaripara, Serpur, Kohetpur, Bhasaipaikar, Jaykrishnapur, Basudebpur, Madna, Ramakantapur, Nayabahadurpur, Fatellapur, Jagtaj, Debipur, Aurangabad, Mahendrapur, Hafania, Dafahat, Paschim Punropara, Ichhlampur, Chakmeghoan, Kakramari, Khanpur, Khidirpur, Bhabki, Ghorsala, Srikantabati, Charka, Dafarpur, Ramnagar, Mirzapur, Giria, Mithipur, Jot Kamal, Osmanpur, Sahajadpur, Khodarampur, Donalia, Teghari, Krishna Sali and Bara Jumla. The subdivision has its headquarters at Jangipur.

=== Police stations ===
Police stations in Jangipur subdivision have the following features and jurisdiction:

Police station	Area covered km^{2}	India-Bangladesh border km	Inter-state border KM	Municipal town	CD Block
Farakka	n/a	-	n/a	-	Farakka
Samserganj	n/a	n/a	n/a	Dhulian	Samserganj
Suti	n/a	n/a	n/a	-	Suti I, Suti II
Raghunathganj	n/a	n/a	n/a	Jangipur	Raghunathganj I, Raghunathganj II
Sagardighi	n/a	-	-	-	Sagardighi

Murshidabad district has a 125.35 km long international border with Bangladesh of which 42.35 km is on land and the remaining is riverine.

There are reports of Bangladeshi infiltrators entering Murshidabad district. An estimate made in 2000 places the total number of illegal Bangladeshi immigrants in India at 1.5 crore, with around 3 lakh entering every year. The thumb rule for such illegal immigrants is that for each illegal person caught four get through. While many immigrants have settled in the border areas, some have moved on, even to far way places such as Mumbai and Delhi. The border is guarded by the Border Security Force. During the UPA government, Sriprakash Jaiswal, Union Minister of State for Home Affairs, had made a statement in Parliament on 14 July 2004, that there were 12 million illegal Bangladeshi infiltrators living in India, and West Bengal topped the list with 5.7 million Bangladeshis. More recently, Kiren Rijiju, Minister of State for Home Affairs in the NDA government has put the figure at around 20 million. Critics point out that the Bengali politicians, particularly those from the ruling Trinamool Congress and the CPI (M), believe that a soft approach to the problem helps them to win Muslim votes.

=== Blocks ===
Community development blocks in Jangipur subdivision are:

CD Block	Headquarters	Area km^{2}	Population (2011)	SC %	ST %	Muslims %	Hindus %	Decadal Growth Rate 2001-2011 %	Literacy rate %	Census Towns
Farakka	Farakka	132.74	274,111	11.93	1.88	67.15	32.23	24.57	60.47	8
Samserganj	Dhulian	84.21	284,072	6.48	0.06	83.48	16.38	34.09	54.98	11
Suti I	Ahiran	143.68	179,908	14.37	0.15	58.15	41.62	29.02	58.06	4
Suti II	Dafahat	111.13	278,922	7.34	0.18	72.53	27.22	30.82	55.23	13
Raghunathganj I	Raghunathganj	140.91	195,627	27.11	1.33	56.48	43.32	26.73	64.49	6
Raghunathganj II	Giria	140.91	265,336	8.76	0.03	81.97	17.87	37.82	61.17	10
Sagardighi	Sagadighi	345.42	310,461	18.78	6.38	64.68	31.56	23.06	65.26	-

=== Gram Panchayats ===
The subdivision contains 61 gram panchayats under 7 community development blocks:

- Raghunathganj I CD Block - Dafarpur, Jarur, Mirjapur, Jamuar, Kanupur and Raninagar.
- Raghunathganj II CD Block - Barasimul Dayarampur, Jotkamal, Mitipur, Sekendra, Kasiadanga, Sammatinagar, Teghari–I, Giria, Lakshmijola and Sekalipur.
- Suti I CD Block - Ahiran, Bansabati, Nurpur, Bahutali, Harua and Sadikpur.
- Suti II CD Block - Aurangabad–I, Jagtai–I, Laxmipur, Umrapur, Aurangabad–II, Jagtai–II, Mahesail–I, Bajitpur, Kasimnagar, Mahesail–II.
- Samserganj CD Block - Bogdadnagar, Gajinagar Malancha, Nimtita, Bhasaipaikar, Chachanda, Pratapganj, Dogachhi Napara, Kanchantala and Tinpukuria.
- Sagardighi CD Block - Balia, Bokhara–I, Kabilpur, Patkeldanga, Bannyeswar, Bokhara–II, Monigram, Sagardighi, Barala, Gobordhandanga and Moregram.
- Farakka CD Blocks - Arjunpur, Bewa–I, Mahadebnagar, Bahadurpur, Bewa–II, Maheshpur, Beniagram, Imamnagar and Nayansukh.
