= Jangipur subdivision =

- Subdivision
- Interactive map of Jangipur subdivision
- Coordinates: 24.47°N 88.07°E
- Country: India
- State: West Bengal
- District: Murshidabad
- Headquarters: Raghunathganj

Government
  - Administrative Division: Malda

Area
  - Total: 1,097.82 km^{2} (423.87 sq mi)

Population (2011)
  - Total: 1,972,308
  - Density: 1,796.57/km^{2} (4,653.09/sq mi)

Languages
  - Official: Bengali, English
- Time zone: UTC+5:30 (IST)
- ISO 3166 code: ISO 3166-2:IN
- Website: wb.gov.in

Jangipur subdivision is an administrative subdivision of Murshidabad district in the state of West Bengal, India. West Bengal's CM Mamata Banerjee announced that a new Farakka subdivision will be created from the Farakka, Suti I, and Suti II blocks of Jangipur Subdivision.

== Overview ==
The Bhagirathi River splits the district into two natural physiographic regions – Rarh on the west and Bagri on the east. Jangipur subdivision lies in the Rarh region in Murshidabad district. The Rarh region spreads over from the adjoining Santhal Pargana division of Jharkhand on the west. The land is slightly higher in altitude than the surrounding plains and is undulating. The Padma River, on the east, separates Murshidabad district from Malda district and Chapai Nawabganj and Rajshahi districts of Bangladesh in the north.

== Geography ==
=== Subdivisions ===
Murshidabad district is divided into the following administrative subdivisions:

Subdivision	Headquarters	Area km^{2}	Population (2011)	Rural population % (2011)	Urban population % (2011)
Barhampur	Baharampur	1,195.57	1,725,525	80.15	19.85
Kandi	Kandi	1,200.76	1,155,645	93.21	6.79
Jangipur	Jangipur	1,097.82	1,972,308	56.43	43.57
Lalbag	Murshidabad	1019.10	1,253,886	92.36	7.64
Domkol	Domkol	837.88	996,443	97.55	2.45
Murshidabad district		5,324.00	7,103,807	80.28	19.72

Cities, towns and locations in the northern portion of Jangipur subdivision, Murshidabad district (including Farakka, Samserganj, Suti II CD blocks)
M: municipal town, CT: census town, R: rural/ urban centre, F: Facility
Abbreviation- TPS: Thermal Power Station
Owing to space constraints in the small map, the actual locations in a larger map may vary slightly
Cities, towns and locations in the southern portion of Jangipur subdivision, Murshidabad district (including Suti I, Raghunathganj I, Raghunathganj II, Sagardighi CD blocks)
M: municipal town, CT: census town, R: rural/ urban centre, F: Facility
Abbreviation- TPS: Thermal Power Station, AMU: Aligarh Muslim University
Owing to space constraints in the small map, the actual locations in a larger map may vary slightly

=== Administrative units ===
Jangipur subdivision has 5 police stations, 7 community development blocks, 7 panchayat samitis, 61 gram panchayats, 561 mouzas, 420 inhabited villages, 2 municipalities and 52 census towns. The municipalities are: Jangipur and Dhulian. The census towns are: Farakka Barrage Township, Srimantapur (P), Benia Gram, Arjunpur, Sibnagar, Memrejpur, Pranpara, Mahadebnagar, Anup Nagar, Jaffrabad, Kankuria, Uttar Mahammadpur, Chachanda, Dhusaripara, Serpur, Kohetpur, Bhasaipaikar, Jaykrishnapur, Basudebpur, Madna, Ramakantapur, Nayabahadurpur, Fatellapur, Jagtaj, Debipur, Aurangabad, Mahendrapur, Hafania, Dafahat, Paschim Punropara, Ichhlampur, Chakmeghoan, Kakramari, Khanpur, Khidirpur, Bhabki, Ghorsala, Srikantabati, Charka, Dafarpur, Ramnagar, Mirzapur, Giria, Mithipur, Jot Kamal, Osmanpur, Sahajadpur, Khodarampur, Donalia, Teghari, Krishna Sali and Bara Jumla. The subdivision has its headquarters at Jangipur.

Note: The two maps present some of the notable locations in the subdivision. All places marked in the maps are linked in the larger full screen maps.

=== Police stations ===
Murshidabad district is divided into two police districts. Jangipur subdivision with seven blocks is under Jangipur police district for law and order purposes.

Police stations in Jangipur subdivision have the following features and jurisdiction:

Police station	Area covered km^{2}	India-Bangladesh border km	Inter-state border KM	Municipal town	CD Block
Farakka	n/a	-	n/a	-	Farakka
Samserganj	n/a	n/a	n/a	Dhulian	Samserganj
Suti	n/a	n/a	n/a	-	Suti I, Suti II
Raghunathganj	n/a	n/a	n/a	Jangipur	Raghunathganj I, Raghunathganj II
Sagardighi	n/a	-	-	-	Sagardighi

Murshidabad district has a 125.35 km long international border with Bangladesh of which 42.35 km is on land and the remaining is riverine.

There are reports of Bangladeshi infiltrators entering Murshidabad district. An estimate made in 2000 places the total number of illegal Bangladeshi immigrants in India at 1.5 crore, with around 3 lakh entering every year. The thumb rule for such illegal immigrants is that for each illegal person caught four get through. While many immigrants have settled in the border areas, some have moved on, even to far way places such as Mumbai and Delhi. The border is guarded by the Border Security Force. During the UPA government, Sriprakash Jaiswal, Union Minister of State for Home Affairs, had made a statement in Parliament on 14 July 2004, that there were 12 million illegal Bangladeshi infiltrators living in India, and West Bengal topped the list with 5.7 million Bangladeshis. More recently, Kiren Rijiju, Minister of State for Home Affairs in the NDA government has put the figure at around 20 million. Critics point out that the Bengali politicians, particularly those from the ruling Trinamool Congress and the CPI (M), believe that a soft approach to the problem helps them to win Muslim votes.

=== Gram Panchayats ===
The subdivision contains 61 gram panchayats under 7 community development blocks:

- Raghunathganj I CD Block - Dafarpur, Jarur, Mirjapur, Jamuar, Kanupur and Raninagar.
- Raghunathganj II CD Block - Barasimul Dayarampur, Jotkamal, Mitipur, Sekendra, Kasiadanga, Sammatinagar, Teghari–I, Giria, Lakshmijola and Sekalipur.
- Suti I CD Block - Ahiran, Bansabati, Nurpur, Bahutali, Harua and Sadikpur.
- Suti II CD Block - Aurangabad–I, Jagtai–I, Laxmipur, Umrapur, Aurangabad–II, Jagtai–II, Mahesail–I, Bajitpur, Kasimnagar, Mahesail–II.
- Samserganj CD Block - Bogdadnagar, Gajinagar Malancha, Nimtita, Bhasaipaikar, Chachanda, Pratapganj, Dogachhi Napara, Kanchantala and Tinpukuria.
- Sagardighi CD Block - Balia, Bokhara–I, Kabilpur, Patkeldanga, Bannyeswar, Bokhara–II, Monigram, Sagardighi, Barala, Gobordhandanga and Moregram.
- Farakka CD Blocks - Arjunpur, Bewa–I, Mahadebnagar, Bahadurpur, Bewa–II, Maheshpur, Beniagram, Imamnagar and Nayansukh.

=== Blocks ===
Community development blocks in Jangipur subdivision are:

CD Block	Headquarters	Area km^{2}	Population (2011)	SC %	ST %	Muslims %	Hindus %	Decadal Growth Rate 2001-2011 %	Literacy rate %	Census Towns
Farakka	Farakka	132.74	274,111	11.93	1.88	67.15	32.23	24.57	60.47	8
Samserganj	Dhulian	84.21	284,072	6.48	0.06	83.48	16.38	34.09	54.98	11
Suti I	Ahiran	143.68	179,908	14.37	0.15	58.15	41.62	29.02	58.06	4
Suti II	Dafahat	111.13	278,922	7.34	0.18	72.53	27.22	30.82	55.23	13
Raghunathganj I	Raghunathganj	140.91	195,627	27.11	1.33	56.48	43.32	26.73	64.49	6
Raghunathganj II	Giria	140.91	265,336	8.76	0.03	81.97	17.87	37.82	61.17	10
Sagardighi	Sagadighi	345.42	310,461	18.78	6.38	64.68	31.56	23.06	65.26	-

=== River bank erosion ===
As of 2013, an estimated 2.4 million people reside along the banks of the Ganges alone in Murshidabad district. The main channel of the Ganges has a bankline of 94 km along its right bank from downstream of Farakka Barrage to Jalangi. Severe erosion occurs all along this bank. The encroaching river wiped out 50 mouzas and engulfed about 10,000 hectares of fertile land. The following blocks have to face the brunt of erosion year after year: Farakka, Samserganj, Suti I, Suti II, Raghunathganj II, Lalgola, Bhagawangola I, Bhagawangola II, Raninagar I, Raninagar II and Jalangi. As per official estimate, till 1992-94 more than 10,000 hectares of chars (flood plain sediment island) have developed in main places, which have become inaccessible from the Indian side but can be reached easily from Bangladesh.

See also - River bank erosion along the Ganges in Malda and Murshidabad districts

== Economy ==
=== Infrastructure ===
All inhabited villages in Murshidabad district have power supply.

See the individual block pages for more information about the infrastructure available.

=== Farakka Barrage ===
Farakka Barrage Project Complex comprises the 2,245 m long Farakka Barrage across the Ganges, the 213 m long Jangipur Barrage across the Bhagirathi, the 38.38 km long Feeder Canal, 33.79 km long Left Afflux Bund of Farakka Barrage and 16.31 km long Left Afflux Bund of Jangipur Barrage, Anti-erosion Protection Work from Rajmahal and Diara (40 km upstream of Farakka Barrage) to Jalangi (80 km downstream from Farakka Barrage) and associated work. Farakka Barrage carries a rail-cum-road bridge. One of the largest projects of its kind in the country, it is under the Union Ministry of Water Resources, River Development & Ganga Rejuvenation.

=== Power stations ===
The 2,100 MW Farakka Super Thermal Power Station of NTPC at Nabarun and the 1,600 MW Sagardighi Thermal Power Station of West Bengal Power Development Corporation, at Manigram, are in Jangipur subdivision.

=== Beedi industry ===
According to a 2016 report, there are around 1,000,000 (1 million/ ten lakh) workers engaged in the beedi industry in Jangipur subdivision. 90% are home-based and 70% of the home-based workers are women. There are around 90 registered manufacturers of major biri brands in West Bengal, the nerve centre being Jangipur subdivision. There are 18 big factories and 50 small factories in this subdivision. The munshi, a contractor, who distributes the raw materials to the homes of workers and collects the finished products, is a key figure. As of 2003, around 400,000 workers were engaged in the prime area locations of beedi making, a household industry, in Farakka, Samserganj, Suti I, Suti II, Raghunathganj I and Raghunathganj II CD Blocks of Jangipur subdivision. The majority of those working were women and children.

=== Agriculture ===
Murshidabad is a predominantly agricultural district. A majority of the population depends on agriculture for a living. The land is fertile. The eastern portion of the Bhagirathi, an alluvial tract, is very fertile for growing Aus paddy, jute and rabi crops. The Kalantar area in the south-eastern portion of the district, is a low-lying area with stiff dark clay and supports mainly the cultivation of Aman paddy. The west flank of the Bhagirathi is a lateritic tract intersected by numerous bils and old river beds. It supports the cultivation of Aman paddy, sugar cane and mulberry.

Given below is an overview of the agricultural production (all data in tonnes) for Jangipur subdivision, other subdivisions and the Murshidabad district, with data for the year 2013-14.

CD Block/ Subdivision	Rice	Wheat	Jute	Pulses	Oil seeds	Potatoes	Sugarcane
Farakka	2,113	1,982	31,799	2,743	837	5,140	25,824
Samserganj	346	221	25,898	329	215	2,424	2,501
Suti I	3,091	122	16,314	273	2,449	3,796	1,359
Suti II	2,716	7,018	65,418	5,479	1,089	11,700	-
Raghunathganj I	12,371	9,326	18,842	179	131	2,752	-
Raghunathganj II	31,996	2,875	32,052	185	664	830	160
Sagardighi	154,839	23,717	17,102	186	6,990	11,555	-
Jangipur subdivision	207,472	45,261	207,425	9,374	12,375	38,197	52,344
Barhampur subdivision	268,587	109,091	914,791	5,758	35,315	39,914	160,221
Kandi subdivision	487,207	4,157	6,186	4,818	9,355	85,886	106,646
Lalbag subdivision	68,034	20,304	427,450	7,809	22,592	40,997	3,295
Domkol subdivision	80,899	109,518	730,393	16,755	33,410	117,082	25,023
Murshidabad district	1,112,199	288,331	2,286,245	44,514	113,047	322.076	347,529

== Education ==
Murshidabad district had a literacy rate of 66.59% (for population of 7 years and above) as per the census of India 2011. Barhampur subdivision had a literacy rate of 72.60%, Kandi subdivision 66.28%, Jangipur subdivision 60.95%, Lalbag subdivision 68.00% and Domkal subdivision 68.35%.

Given in the table below (data in numbers) is a comprehensive picture of the education scenario in Murshidabad district for the year 2013-14:

Subdivision	Primary School		Middle School		High School		Higher Secondary School		General College, Univ		Technical / Professional Instt		Non-formal Education	
Subdivision	Institution	Student	Institution	Student	Institution	Student	Institution	Student	Institution	Student	Institution	Student	Institution	Student
Barhampur	728	88,371	107	13,364	37	31,214	92	162,613	7	17,418	11	2,796	2,278	100,164
Kandi	672	66,030	105	11,248	46	32,752	61	87,482	5	7,830	3	400	1,717	74,370
Jangipur	747	144,416	72	14,159	25	30,004	76	194,025	5	15,335	5	500	2,793	160,236
Lalbag	601	72,429	74	8,997	24	22,174	66	120,454	5	13,088	7	759	2,082	93,891
Domkol	432	52,177	73	11,791	22	23,201	47	86,672	3	7,211	11	2,457	1,612	74,330
Murshidabad district	3,180	423,423	431	59,559	154	139,345	342	651,246	25	60,882	37	6,912	10,482	502,991

Note: Primary schools include junior basic schools; middle schools, high schools and higher secondary schools include madrasahs; technical schools include junior technical schools, junior government polytechnics, industrial technical institutes, industrial training centres, nursing training institutes etc.; technical and professional colleges include engineering colleges, medical colleges, para-medical institutes, management colleges, teachers training and nursing training colleges, law colleges, art colleges, music colleges etc. Special and non-formal education centres include sishu siksha kendras, madhyamik siksha kendras, centres of Rabindra mukta vidyalaya, recognised Sanskrit tols, institutions for the blind and other handicapped persons, Anganwadi centres, reformatory schools etc.

The following institutions are located in Jangipur subdivision:

- The Murshidabad Centre of Aligarh Muslim University was established at Village & PO Jangipur Barrage, PS Suti in 2010. It started classes for the 2-years Master of Business Administration (MBA) and the 5-years BA LLB programmes in 2011. It started B.Ed. in 2013.
- Management Development Institute, Murshidabad, was established at Sakim Katnai, Kutori, PO Uttar Ramna, PS Raghunathganj. MDI, Murshidabad campus was inaugurated by Pranab Mukherjee, President of India, in 2014. It offers a residential post-graduate programme in management.
- Jangipur College was established in 1950 at Jangipur.
- Prof. Sayed Nurul Hasan College was established in 1994 at Farakka, It is named after Saiyid Nurul Hasan, historian and former governor of West Bengal.
- Nur Mohammad Smriti Mahavidyalaya was established in 2008 at Dhulian.
- Dukhulal Nibaran Chandra College was established in 1967 at Aurangabad.
- Sagardighi Kamada Kinkar Smriti Mahavidyalaya was established in 2008 at Sagardighi.
- Sagardighi Teachers’ Training College was established at Manigram in 2009.

== Healthcare ==
The table below (all data in numbers) presents an overview of the medical facilities available and patients treated in the hospitals, health centres and sub-centres in 2014 in Murshidabad district.

Subdivision	Health & Family Welfare Deptt, WB				Other State Govt Deptts	Local bodies	Central Govt Deptts / PSUs	NGO / Private Nursing Homes	Total	Total Number of Beds	Total Number of Doctors*	Indoor Patients	Outdoor Patients
Subdivision	Hospitals	Rural Hospitals	Block Primary Health Centres	Primary Health Centres	Other State Govt Deptts	Local bodies	Central Govt Deptts / PSUs	NGO / Private Nursing Homes	Total	Total Number of Beds	Total Number of Doctors*	Indoor Patients	Outdoor Patients
Berhampore	2	2	4	15	3	-	-	45	71	1,645	282	149,393	2,094,027
Kandi	1	2	3	17	1	-	-	6	30	567	68	85,624	1,005,056
Jangipur	1	1	6	15	-	-	2	12	37	590	62	141,427	1,043,548
Lalbag	1	2	3	14	-	1	1	23	45	483	65	105,562	1,154,275
Domkal	1	2	2	9	-	-	-	19	33	252	44	45,110	802,309
Murshidabad district	6	9	18	70	4	1	3	105	216	2,537	521	527,116	6,099,215

.* Excluding nursing homes

Medical facilities in Jangipur subdivision are as follows:

Hospitals: (Name, location, beds)
Jangipur Subdivisional Hospital, Jangipur, 250 beds
Central Hospital for Beedi Workers, Malancha, Samserganj CD Block, 50 beds
Farakka Barrage Hospital, Farakka, 50 beds

Rural Hospitals: (Name, block, location, beds)
Sagardighi Rural Hospital, Sagardighi CD Block, Sagardighi, 30 beds
Anupnagar Rural Hospital, Samseganj CD Block, Dhulian, 30 beds
Mahesail Rural Hospital, Suti II CD Block, Mahesail, Parulia via Auragabad, 30 beds

Block Primary Health Centres: (Name, block, location, beds)
Farakka BPHC, Farakka CD Block, Farakka, 10 beds
Ahiran BPHC, Suti I CD Block, Ahiran, 15 beds
Rajnagar BPHC, Raghunathganj I CD Block, Rajnagar, 6 beds
Teghari BPHC, Raghunathganj II CD Block, Teghari, 10 beds

Primary Health Centres: (CD Block-wise)(CD Block, PHC location, beds)
Sagardighi CD Block: Monigram (10), Singeswari-Gouripur (6), Suryapur, Dhanparganj (4)
Farakka CD Block: Benipur (working as BPHC) (15), Arjunpur (10), Kendua, Srimantapur (2)
Samserganj CD Block: Putimari (2), Uttar Mahammadpur (10)
Suti I CD Block: Bahutali (10), Hilora (10)
Suti II CD Block: Aurangabad, Dafahat (10), Baje Gajipur, Kassimnagar (6)
Raghunathganj I CD Block: Barla (10), Gankar (2)
Raghunathganj II CD Block: Mohammadpur, Adikantapur (10)

== Electoral constituencies ==
Lok Sabha (parliamentary) and Vidhan Sabha (state assembly) constituencies in Jangipur subdivision were as follows:

Lok Sabha constituency	Reservation	Vidhan Sabha constituency	Reservation	CD Block and/or Gram panchayats and/or municipal areas
Jangipur	None	Suti	None	Suti II community development block and Bahutali, Harua and Sadikpur gram panchayats of Suti I CD Block
		Jangipur	None	Jangipur municipality, Raghunathganj I CD Block and Ahiran and Bansabati GPs of Suti I CD Block
		Raghunathganj	None	Raghunathganj II CD Block, Nurpur GP of Suti I CD Block and Maiya GP of Lalgola CD Block
		Sagardighi	None	Sagardighi CD Block
		Lalgola in Lalbag subdivision	None	Airmari Krishnapur, Bahadurpur, Bilbora Kopra, Dewansarai, Jasaitala, Kalmegha, Lalgola, Manikchak, Nashipur, Paikpara and Ramchandrapur GPs of Lalgola CD Block and Kantanagar GP of Bhagawangola I CD Block
		Nabagram in Lalbag subdivision	Reserved for SC	Nabagram CD Block, and Niyallishpara Goaljan, Radharghat I, Radharghat II and Sahajadpur GPs of Berhampore CD Block
		Khargram in Kandi subdivision	Reserved for SC	Khargram CD Block, and Kalyanpur I and Kalyanpur II GPs of Burwan CD Block
Maldaha Dakshin	None	Farakka	None	Farakka Block, and Gajinagar Malancha and Kanchantala GPs of Samserganj CD Block
		Samserganj	None	Dhulian municipality and Bhasaipaikar, Bogdadnagar, Chachanda, Dogachhi, Napara, Nimtita, Pratapganj and Tinpukuria GPs of Samserganj CD Block
		5 assembly segments in Malda district		
