= Jakir Hossain (politician) =

Indian politician

Member of West Bengal Legislative Assembly
- In office 20 May 2016 – 4 May 2026
- Preceded by: Mohammad Sohrab
- Succeeded by: Chitta Mukherjee
- Constituency: Jangipur

Personal details
- Born: 28 June 1972 (age 54) Murshidabad, India
- Party: Trinamool Congress
- Other political affiliations: Indian National Congress
- Education: West Bengal Council of Rabindra Open Schooling
- Occupation: Politician, businessman

Jakir Hossain (born 28 June 1972) is an Indian politician and businessman from West Bengal, who served as a member of the West Bengal Assembly from Jangipur seat in Murshidabad. A member of Trinamool Congress, he served as Minister of State of Labour until 2021.

== Early life ==
Hossain was born on 28 June 1972 in Murshidabad, West Bengal. His father was Jayed Ali Biswas. He completed his education in the 10th Class from The West Bengal Council of Rabindra Open Schooling in December 2009.

. He was closely associated with the Indian National Congress but later shifted to Trinamool Congress. In the 2016 elections, he was elected from the Jangipur seat. In 2018 he was appointed Minister of State from the Labour Department. Before the 2021 elections, he was waiting at platform number 2 in Nimtita Railway Station to catch a train to Kolkata around 10 pm on 17 February, but a crude bomb exploded, and was injured. Police detained a Bangladeshi person as a suspect. He was re-elected from the same seat.

== Controversies ==
On 12 January 2023, the Income Tax Department raided Hossain's properties including his house, rice mill, and other beedi factories in Raghunathganj, Suti, and Samserganj in Murshidabad, among other areas. They seized Rs 10.90 crore in cash. However, Hossain denied any wrongdoing as he claimed this money was for salaries to the laborers working in his mills.

== Assets & Liabilities ==
According to the candidate's self-declared election affidavit compiled by the Association for Democratic Reforms (ADR), they possess significant financial holdings, with total declared assets valued at approximately ₹133.52 crore. In contrast, their declared liabilities stand at a relatively low ₹8.46 crore. This substantial net worth places the candidate among the wealthiest political figures in the region, reflecting a robust financial foundation and considerable personal resources entering the campaign trail. However, a net worth of this magnitude—paired with exceptionally low liabilities—invariably raises unanswered questions about the true sources and sudden accumulation of such immense capital.
