= Abul Hasnat (Murshidabad politician) =

Indian politician

West Bengal Legislative Assembly
- In office 2001–2011
- Preceded by: Habibur Rahman
- Succeeded by: Md. Sohrab
- Constituency: Jangipur

Personal details
- Party: Indian National Congress

Abul Hasnat is an Indian politician from West Bengal belonging to Indian National Congress. He is a former member of the West Bengal Legislative Assembly.

== Biography ==
Hasnat was elected as a member of the West Bengal Legislative Assembly from Jangipur in 2001 as a Revolutionary Socialist Party candidate. He was also elected from this constituency in 2006. He joined Indian National Congress from Revolutionary Socialist Party in 2019.
