= Farakka subdivision =

Farakka subdivision is a proposed administrative division of Murshidabad district in the state of West Bengal, India. The State Cabinet on 2 June 2025 approved the creation of new Farakka subdivision.

== Overview ==
The subdivision will be formed by dividing Jangipur subdivision. The Farakka sub-division will consist of Farakka, Suti I, Suti II and Shamsherganj blocks. It will also include the Dhuliyan Municipality.
