= Jakir Hossain =

Jakir Hossain may refer to:

- Jakir Hossain (politician) (born 1979), Indian politician and businessman from West Bengal
- Jakir Hossain (cricketer), Bangladeshi cricketer
- Jakir Hossain Raju, Bangladeshi film director
- Jakir Hossain Institute of Polytechnic, Aurangabad, West Bengal, India
