= Mohammad Yusuf Siddiq =

Bengali epigraphist

Professor Mohammad Yusuf Siddiq Dr
- মুহম্মদ ইউসুফ সিদ্দিক
- Born: 1957 (age 68–69); Birbhum, West Bengal
- Citizenship: Bangali
- Education: Ph.D.
- Alma mater: Umm al-Qura University
- Occupations: Epigraphist, historian, professor, author, Social Worker, Philanthropist
- Employer: International Centre for the Study of Bengal Art
- Organization: BANI (Bengal Association for Needy Peoples' Improvement)
- Notable work: Epigraphy of Bengal
- Parents: Professor Dr Muhammad Mujibur Rahman (father); Bilkis Begum (mother)

Mohammad Yusuf Siddiq (Bengali: মুহম্মদ ইউসুফ সিদ্দিক; born 1957) is a Bengali epigraphist, historian, environmental researcher, professor and author. His work mainly focuses on inscriptions pertaining to the Sultanate period of historic Bengal. Siddiq is the president of the Bangladesh Association for Needy People's Improvement.

== Early life and family ==
Siddiq was born in 1957 to a Bengali Muslim parents, Mohammad Mujibur Rahman and Bilqis Begum, from the village of Dadanchak in the Nawabganj District of East Pakistan (now Bangladesh). His father was a professor and historian. Siddiq's family had migrated from Gopalganj village near Sujnipara, Murshidabad (present-day West Bengal). They are Mandals with Khorasani ancestry. His lineage is as follows: Mohammad Yusuf Siddiq ibn Mujibur Rahman ibn Abdul Ghani ibn Ayyub Husayn ibn Haji Shahadat Mandal ibn Bulaqi Mandal ibn Nizamuddin Mandal ibn Abdul Karim Mandal ibn Haydar Ali Khan.

== Academic education and career ==
Siddiq is fluent in 10 languages. He obtained his degree from Umm al-Qura University in Mecca, Saudi Arabia.

Siddiq became an associate professor of Islamic studies at Islamic University, Bangladesh. Between 1991 and 1992, he was a visiting fellow at the Oxford Centre for Islamic Studies. Siddiq was then offered various positions at Harvard University, serving from 1987 to 1994 and 1996 to 1998. He served as a research fellow at the Aga Khan Program for Islamic Architecture and Massachusetts Institute of Technology. He later became a faculty member of Islamic history and civilisation at the University of Sharjah in the United Arab Emirates. Between 1998 and 2001, he served as the founding chairman of the Department of Arabic and Islamic Studies at Zayed University.

Siddiq was a Higher Education Commission professor of Islamic History, Civilization and culture at the Faculty of Islamic Studies, University of the Punjab in Lahore. In 2011, he became a professor of Arabic in the Gurmani Centre for Languages and Literature at the Lahore University of Management Sciences. In 2013, he was awarded an honorary fellowship at the International Centre for Study of Bengal Art. He has written many articles for the Encyclopaedia of Islam, Muqarnas, Bulletin of the School of Oriental & African Studies, Journal of the Asiatic Society of Bangladesh and Journal of Islamic Studies (Oxford). Siddiq was a member of the executive council of the International Society of Bengal Studies from 2018 to 2020.

== Works ==
Siddiq is a specialist in Islamic epigraphy – particularly from the Sultanate of Bengal. His book, Epigraphy and Islamic Culture, is considered an important reference in the history of Islamic inscriptions in the region.

=== Arabic ===
- Mohammad Yusuf Siddiq (1991). دراسات في الحضارة والثقافة الاسلامية في بلاد البنغال. Islamic University, Bangladesh. ISBN 978-1592393398.
- Mohammad Yusuf Siddiq (2004). رحلة مع النقوش الكتابية الإسلامية في بلاد البنغال: دراسة تاريخية حاضرية. Damascus, Syria: Furat. ISBN 978-1592393398.

=== English ===
- Mohammad Yusuf Siddiq (1989). "An Epigraphical Journey to an Eastern Islamic Land". Muqarnas.
- Mohammad Yusuf Siddiq (1991). Arabic and Persian texts of the Islamic inscriptions of Bengal. Watertown, Massachusetts: South Asia Press.
- Mohammad Yusuf Siddiq (2003). "An Ecological Journey in Muslim Bengal". In Foltz, R.; Baharuddin, A.; Denny, F. (eds.). Islam and ecology: A bestowed trust. Harvard University Press. pp. 451–462.
- Mohammad Yusuf Siddiq (2005). "Calligraphy and Islamic culture: reflections on some new epigraphical discoveries in Gaur and Pandua, two early capitals of Muslim Bengal". Bulletin of the School of Oriental & African Studies. 68. Cambridge University Press.
- Mohammad Yusuf Siddiq; Frisbie, Seth; et al. "The development and use of an innovative laboratory method for measuring arsenic in drinking water from western Bangladesh". Environmental Health Perspectives.
- Mohammad Yusuf Siddiq (2007). "Mosque as a form of socio-cultural expression in Muslim Bengal with special reference to the Calligraphic Design of Adina Masjid". Journal of the Asiatic Society of Bangladesh. 52. Asiatic Society of Bangladesh: 197–212.
- Mohammad Yusuf Siddiq (2009). "The Diffusion of Islam in the Eastern Frontier of South Asia: A Fresh Approach". Jihat Al-Islam. 2: 39–78.
- Mohammad Yusuf Siddiq (2009). "Inscription as an Important Means for Understanding the History of the Islamic East: Observations on some Newly Discovered Epigraphs of Muslim Bengal". Journal of Islamic Studies. 20 (2): 213–250. doi:10.1093/jis/etn070.
- Mohammad Yusuf Siddiq (2009). Haque, Enamul (ed.). Historical and Cultural Aspects of the Islamic Inscriptions of Bengal: A Reflective Study of Some New Epigraphic Discoveries. Dhaka: International Centre for Study of Bengal Art.
- Mohammad Yusuf Siddiq; Cheema, M. A.; et al. (2009). "Human serum albumin unfolding pathway upon drug binding: A thermodynamic and spectroscopic description". Journal of Chemical Thermodynamics. 41 (4): 439. Bibcode:2009JChTh..41..439C. doi:10.1016/j.jct.2008.11.011.
- Mohammad Yusuf Siddiq (2011). "Spiritual Dimensions of Islam: Sufism, Sheikhs and Khanqahs of Bengal". In Alam, Ishrat; Hussain, Syed Ejaz (eds.). The Varied Facets Of History: Essays In Honour Of Aniruddha Roy. Primus Books. ISBN 978-93-80607-16-0.
- Mohammad Yusuf Siddiq (2012). "Epigraphy and Islamic history in South Asia". Journal of Islamic Thought and Civilization. 2.
- Mohammad Yusuf Siddiq. Advent of Islam in Bengal: An Epigraphic Approach. International Proceedings of Economics Development and Research.
- Mohammad Yusuf Siddiq; Farooqi, Z.; et al. (2014). "Effect of crosslinker feed content on catalaytic activity of silver nanoparticles fabricated in multiresponsive microgels". Korean Journal of Chemical Engineering. 31. South Korea.
- Mohammad Yusuf Siddiq (2015). Epigraphy and Islamic Culture: Inscriptions of the Early Muslim Rulers of Bengal (1205-1494). Routledge. ISBN 978-1-317-58746-0.
- Mohammad Yusuf Siddiq (2016). A Descriptive Catalogue of the Arabic and Persian Inscriptions in the Bangladesh National Museum. Ministry of Cultural Affairs (Bangladesh). ISBN 978-9843390837.
- Mohammad Yusuf Siddiq (2017). Haque, Enamul (ed.). Arabic and Persian Inscriptions of Bengal. The International Centre for Study of Bengal Art. ISBN 9789843448651.
- Mohammad Yusuf Siddiq (2021). Haque, Enamul (ed.). "Geography, Religion and Social Life of Bengal as Reflected in Some Inscriptions". Journal of Bengal Art. 26. The International Centre For Study of Bengal Art.

=== Bengali ===
- Mohammad Yusuf Siddiq. বাংলায় ইসলামের আবির্ভাব ও বিকাশ এবং একটি নতুন ধারার গোড়াপত্তন.
- Mohammad Yusuf Siddiq. Al-Mahmud, Z. (ed.). "বাংলার ইসলামি শিলালিপির আধ্যাত্মিক দিক". পুনর্পাঠ (October–December 2020 ed.).
- Mohammad Yusuf Siddiq (2021). নিদ্রিত শিলার মুখরিত লিপি : বাংলার আরবী-ফার্সী লেখমালা (১২০৫-১৪৮৮). Agamee Prakashani. ISBN 978-9840426461.
- Mohammad Yusuf Siddiq (17 January 2023). "ইসলামী শিল্পকলা ও বঙ্গীয় সংস্কৃতি". The Daily Sangram.

=== Indonesian ===
- Mohammad Yusuf Siddiq (October 2017). "Pembelajaran Bahasa Arab di Pondok Pesantren Darunnajah Jakarta: Studi Etnografi". Al-Ma'rifah. 14.
