= Emani Biswas =

Indian politician

Member of the West Bengal Legislative Assembly
- Incumbent
- Assumed office 2 May 2021
- Preceded by: Humayun Reza
- Constituency: Suti

Personal details
- Party: AITC
- Profession: Politician

Emani Biswas is an Indian politician member of All India Trinamool Congress. He is an MLA, elected from the Suti constituency in the 2011 West Bengal Legislative Assembly election as an Indian National Congress candidate. In 2021 assembly election he was re-elected from the same constituency as an All India Trinamool Congress candidate.
