= Chitta Mukherjee =

Indian politician (born 1951)

Chitta Mukherjee (born 1951) is an Indian politician from West Bengal. He is a member of the West Bengal Legislative Assembly from the Jangipur Assembly constituency in Murshidabad district representing the Bharatiya Janata Party.

== Early life and education ==
Mukherjee is from Jangipur, Murshidabad district, West Bengal. He is the son of the late Kamakshya Pad Mukherjee. He completed his BL at University of Calcutta In 1978 and did his BEd in 1983 also at University of Calcutta. He is an advocate. He declared assets worth Rs.2.8 crore in his affidavit to the Election Commission of India.

== Career ==
Mukherjee won the Jangipur, West Bengal Assembly constituency representing the Bharatiya Janata Party in the 2026 West Bengal Legislative Assembly election. He polled 91,201 votes and defeated his nearest rival and two time sitting MLA, Jakir Hossain of the All India Trinamool Congress by a margin of 10,542 votes.
