= Humayun Reza =

Indian politician (born 1948)

Member of the West Bengal Legislative Assembly
- In office 2016–2021
- Preceded by: Emani Biswas
- Succeeded by: Emani Biswas
- Constituency: Suti

Personal details
- Born: 6 December 1948 (age 77)
- Party: Indian National Congress
- Education: University of North Bengal (B.Ed., 1979)
- Occupation: Pensioner
- Profession: Politician

Humayun Reza (born 6 December 1948) is an Indian politician from West Bengal. He is a former member of the West Bengal Legislative Assembly from Suti Assembly constituency in Murshidabad district. He was elected in the 2016 West Bengal Legislative Assembly election representing the Indian National Congress Party.

== Early life and education ==
Reza is from Daharpar, Mahendrapur village, Murshidabad district, West Bengal. He is the son of late Lutfal Haque. He completed his Bachelors degree in Education at North Bengal University in 1979. Earlier, he did his Bachelor of Science degree in a college affiliate to Calcutta University in 1968.

== Career ==
Reza was elected in the Suti Assembly constituency representing the Indian National Congress in the 2016 West Bengal Legislative Assembly election. He polled 84,017 votes and defeated his nearest rival, Emani Biswas of the All India Trinamool Congress, by a margin of 3,950 votes. He lost the next election in the 2021 West Bengal Legislative Assembly election which was won by Emani Biswas of the Trinamool Congress. Reza could only finish third behind BJP's Kaushik Das, who came second. Before the election, a section of the local Congress workers protested against the re-nomination of Reza for the Suti seat.

He has no criminal cases against him and has less than Rs.1 crore assets as declared to the Election Commission of India.
