= Ghorsala =

- Census Town
- Location in West Bengal, India Ghorsala (India)
- Coordinates: 24.46724°N 88.03678°E
- Country: India
- State: West Bengal
- District: Murshidabad

Area
  - Total: 3.6 km^{2} (1.4 sq mi)

Population (2011)
  - Total: 7,837
  - Density: 2,200/km^{2} (5,600/sq mi)

Languages
  - Official: Bengali, English
- Time zone: UTC+5:30 (IST)
- Vehicle registration: WB
- Lok Sabha constituency: Jangipur
- Vidhan Sabha constituency: Jangipur
- Website: murshidabad.nic.in

Ghorsala is a census town in the Raghunathganj I CD block in the Jangipur subdivision of the Murshidabad district in the Indian state of West Bengal.

== Geography ==
Cities, towns and locations in the southern portion of Jangipur subdivision, Murshidabad district (including Suti I, Raghunathganj I, Raghunathganj II, Sagardighi CD blocks)
M: municipal town, CT: census town, R: rural/ urban centre, F: Facility
Abbreviation- TPS: Thermal Power Station, AMU: Aligarh Muslim University
Owing to space constraints in the small map, the actual locations in a larger map may vary slightly

=== Location ===
Ghorsala is located at 24.46724°N 88.03678°E.

=== Area overview ===
Jangipur subdivision is crowded with 52 census towns and as such it had to be presented in two location maps. One of the maps can be seen alongside. The subdivision is located in the Rarh region that is spread over from adjoining Santhal Pargana division of Jharkhand. The land is slightly higher in altitude than the surrounding plains and is gently undulating. The river Ganges, along with its distributaries, is prominent in both the maps. At the head of the subdivision is the 2,245 metres (7,365 ft) long Farakka Barrage, one of the largest projects of its kind in the country. Murshidabad district shares with Bangladesh a porous international border which is notoriously crime prone (partly shown in this map). The subdivision has two large power plants - the 2,100 MW Farakka Super Thermal Power Station and the 1,600 MW Sagardighi Thermal Power Station. According to a 2016 report, there are around 1,000,000 (1 million/ ten lakh) workers engaged in the beedi industry in Jangipur subdivision. 90% are home-based and 70% of the home-based workers are women. As of 2013, an estimated 2.4 million people reside along the banks of the Ganges alone in Murshidabad district. Severe erosion occurs along the banks.

Note: The two maps present some of the notable locations in the subdivision. All places marked in the maps are linked in the larger full screen maps.

== Demographics ==
According to the 2011 Census of India, Ghorsala had a total population of 7,837, of which 4,077 (52%) were males and 3,760 (48%) were females. Population in the age range 0–6 years was 1,157. The total number of literate persons in Ghorsala was 4,513 (67.56% of the population over 6 years).

As of 2001 India census, Ghorsala had a population of 6252. Males constitute 50% of the population and females 50%. Ghorsala has an average literacy rate of 50%, lower than the national average of 59.5%: male literacy is 56%, and female literacy is 44%. In Ghorsala, 19% of the population is under 6 years of age.

== Infrastructure ==
According to the District Census Handbook, Murshidabad, 2011, Ghorsala covered an area of 3.6 km^{2}. xIt had 8 km roads. The protected water-supply involved overhead tank, tube well/ borewell. It had 408 domestic electric connections, 10 road lighting points. Among the medical facilities it had 1 nursing home, 2 charitable hospitals/ nursing homes, 5 medicine shops. Among the educational facilities, it had 1 primary school in town, other school facilities at Saidpur 3 km away, general degree college at Jangipur 9 km away. It produced beedi, plastic goods.

== Healthcare ==
Raghunathganj I CD block is one of the areas of Murshidabad district where ground water is affected by a high level of arsenic contamination. The WHO guideline for arsenic in drinking water is 10 mg/ litre, and the Indian Standard value is 50 mg/ litre. The maximum concentration in Raghunathaganj I CD block is 3,003 mg/litre.
