= Poradanga Halt railway station =

Railway station in West Bengal, India

Poradanga railway station

General information
- Location: Poradanga, Murshidabad district, West Bengal; India
- Coordinates: 24°09′13″N 88°08′00″E
- Elevation: 24 m (79 ft)
- System: Passenger train station
- Owner: Indian Railways
- Operator: Eastern Railway zone
- Line: Barharwa–Azimganj–Katwa loop Line
- Platforms: 3
- Tracks: 2

Construction
- Structure type: Standard (on ground station)

Other information
- Status: Active
- Station code: PRDG
- Zone(s): Eastern Railway zone
- Division(s): Malda

History
- Former names: East Indian Railway Company

Services
Preceding station	Indian Railways	Following station
Azimganj City towards Katwa Junction	Eastern Railway zone Barharwa–Azimganj–Katwa loop	Mahipal Road towards Barharwa Junction
Location

Poradanga Halt railway station is a halt railway station on the Barharwa–Azimganj–Katwa loop of Malda railway division of Eastern Railway zone. It is situated at Poradanga village of Murshidabad district in the Indian state of West Bengal.

== History ==
In 1913, the Hooghly–Katwa Railway constructed a 1,676 mm (5 ft 6 in)-wide 5 ft 6 in (1,676 mm) broad gauge line from Bandel to Katwa, and the Barharwa–Azimganj–Katwa Railway constructed the 1,676 mm (5 ft 6 in)-wide 5 ft 6 in (1,676 mm) broad gauge Barharwa–Azimganj–Katwa loop. With the construction of the Farakka Barrage and opening of the railway bridge in 1971, the railway communication picture of this line were completely changed. Total 13 trains including few local and passengers stop at Poradanga railway station.
