= Habibur Rahman (Indian politician) =

Indian politician

West Bengal Legislative Assembly
- In office 1972–1991
- Preceded by: Radaruddin Ahammad
- Succeeded by: Abdul Haque
- Constituency: Jangipur
- In office 1996–2001
- Preceded by: Abdul Haque
- Succeeded by: Abul Hasnat
- Constituency: Jangipur

Personal details
- Born: c. 1930
- Died: 16 January 2016 (aged 86)
- Party: Indian National Congress

Qari Habibur Rahman Attari Amjadi (c. 1930 – 16 January 2016) was an Indian teacher and politician from West Bengal belonging to Indian National Congress. He was elected as a legislator of the West Bengal Legislative Assembly for five times.

== Biography ==
Rahman was a primary school teacher. He involved with the politics of Indian National Congress during his student life. He was a member of the West Bengal Pradesh Congress Committee.

Rahman was elected as a member of the West Bengal Legislative Assembly from Jangipur in 1972, 1977, 1982 and 1987 for consecutive four times. He contested in 1991 but did not win. Later, he was also elected as a legislator of the West Bengal Legislative Assembly from Jangipur in 1996.

Rahman contested from Jangipur in 2001 as an independent candidate but did not win. In that year he was suspended from Indian National Congress. Later, his suspension order was withdrawn in 2002. He also contested from Jangipur in 2006 but did not win.

Rahman died on 16 January 2016 at S. S. K. M. Hospital in Kolkata at the age of 79.
