= Sahajadpur =

- Census Town
- Location in West Bengal, India Sahajadpur (India)
- Coordinates: 24.0101°N 88.4767°E
- Country: India
- State: West Bengal
- District: Murshidabad

Area
  - Total: 1.57 km^{2} (0.61 sq mi)

Population (2011)
  - Total: 23,280
  - Density: 14,800/km^{2} (38,400/sq mi)

Languages
  - Official: Bengali, English
- Time zone: UTC+5:30 (IST)
- Vehicle registration: WB
- Lok Sabha constituency: Jangipur
- Vidhan Sabha constituency: Raghunathganj
- Website: murshidabad.nic.in

Sahajadpur is a census town in the Raghunathganj II CD block in the Jangipur subdivision of the Murshidabad district in the Indian state of West Bengal.

== Geography ==
=== Location ===
Sahajadpur is located at 24.0101°N 88.4767°E.

== Demographics ==
According to the 2011 Census of India, Shahjadpur had a total population of 23,280, of which 11,966 (51%) were males and 11,314 (48%) were females. Population in the age range 0-6 years was 3,806. The total number of literate persons in Shahjadpur was 1,2736 (65.40% of the population over 6 years).

As of 2001 India census, Sahajadpur had a population of 15,720. Males constitute 48% of the population and females 52%. Sahajadpur has an average literacy rate of 44%, lower than the national average of 59.5%: male literacy is 53%, and female literacy is 37%. In Sahajadpur, 20% of the population is under 6 years of age.

== Infrastructure ==
According to the District Census Handbook, Murshidabad, 2011, Sahajadpur covered an area of 1.57 km^{2}. It had 20 km roads with both open and closed drains. The protected water-supply involved pressure tank, hand pump, tap water untreated source. It had 2,800 domestic electric connections, 20 road lighting points. Among the educational facilities, it had 5 primary schools, 1 senior secondary school in town, general degree college at Jangipur 6 km away. It had 5 non-formal education centres (Sarva Shiksha Abhiyan). It produced beedi, papad.

== Healthcare ==
Raghunathganj II CD block is one of the areas of Murshidabad district where ground water is affected by a high level of arsenic contamination. The WHO guideline for arsenic in drinking water is 10 mg/ litre, and the Indian Standard value is 50 mg/ litre. The maximum concentration in Raghunathaganj II CD block is 875 mg/litre.
