= Harua =

- Village
- Nickname: Haroa
- Location in West Bengal, India Harua (India)
- Coordinates: 24.5257°N 87.9898°E
- Country: India
- State: West Bengal
- District: Murshidabad

Population (2011)
  - Total: 9,012

Languages
  - Official: Bengali, English
- Time zone: UTC+5:30 (IST)
- PIN: 731221
- ISO 3166 code: IN-WB
- Lok Sabha constituency: Jangipur
- Vidhan Sabha constituency: Suti.
- Website: murshidabad.nic.in

Harua is a village and gram panchayat in the Suti I CD block in the Jangipur subdivision of Murshidabad district in the state of West Bengal, India.

== Geography ==
Cities, towns and locations in the southern portion of Jangipur subdivision, Murshidabad district (including Suti I, Raghunathganj I, Raghunathganj II, and Sagardighi CD blocks)
M: municipal town, CT: census town, R: rural / urban centre, F: Facility
Abbreviation: TPS: Thermal Power Station, AMU: Aligarh Muslim University
Owing to space constraints in the small map, the actual locations in a larger map may vary slightly.

=== Location ===
Harua is located at 24.5257°N 87.9898°E.

=== Area overview ===
Jangipur subdivision is crowded with 52 census towns. The subdivision is located in the Rarh region that is spread over from adjoining Santhal Pargana division of Jharkhand. The land is slightly higher in altitude than the surrounding plains and is gently undulating. The river Ganges, along with its distributaries, is prominent nearby. At the head of the subdivision is the 2,245 m long Farakka Barrage, one of the largest projects of its kind in the country. Murshidabad district shares with Bangladesh a porous international border which is notoriously crime prone. The subdivision has two large power plants—the 2,100 MW Farakka Super Thermal Power Station and the 1,600 MW Sagardighi Thermal Power Station. According to a 2016 report, there are around 1,000,000 (1 million / ten lakh) workers engaged in the beedi industry in Jangipur subdivision. 90% are home-based and 70% of the home-based workers are women. As of 2013, an estimated 2.4 million people reside along the banks of the Ganges alone in Murshidabad district. Severe erosion occurs along the banks.

Note: The two maps present some of the notable locations in the subdivision. All places marked in the maps are linked in the larger full screen maps.

== Demographics ==
According to the 2011 census of India, Harua had a total population of 9,012, of which 4,613 (51%) were males and 4,399 (49%) were females. The population in the age range 0–6 years was 1,664. The total number of literate people in Harua was 3,382 (46.03% of the population over 6 years old).

== Economy ==
In this area, United Bank of India has Harua branch.

== Education ==
- Harowa High School, Harua
- Nayagram Y. M. High School, Suti I
