= Ahiran =

Village in West Bengal, India

Ahiran Ahiron
- Village/City
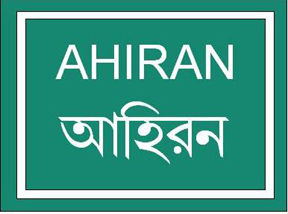

- Location in West Bengal, India Ahiran (India)
- Coordinates: 24.52°N 88.02°E
- Country: India
- State: West Bengal
- District: Murshidabad

Area
  - Total: 91.75 km^{2} (35.42 sq mi)

Population (2011)
  - Total: 17,079
  - Density: 186.1/km^{2} (482.1/sq mi)
- Time zone: UTC+5:30 (IST)
- PIN: 742223
- ISO 3166 code: IN-WB
- Lok Sabha constituency: Jangipur
- Vidhan Sabha constituency: Jangipur
- Website: murshidabad.nic.in

Ahiran is a village in the Suti I CD block in the Jangipur subdivision of Murshidabad district in the state of West Bengal, India. It serves as the Headquarters of the Suti I administrative division.

== History ==
This is a historical village of Murshidabad district. The word Ahiran means "an area of Ahirs". Gold coins belonging to Gupta period were found at Ahiran during road construction on National Highway 34 (India).

== Geography ==
Cities, towns and locations in the southern portion of Jangipur subdivision, Murshidabad district (including Suti I, Raghunathganj I, Raghunathganj II, Sagardighi CD blocks)
M: municipal town, CT: census town, R: rural/ urban centre, F: Facility
Abbreviation- TPS: Thermal Power Station, AMU: Aligarh Muslim University
Owing to space constraints in the small map, the actual locations in a larger map may vary slightly

=== Location ===
Ahiran is located at 24°31′N 88°01′E . The village is situated on the bank of Bansloi River.

=== Area overview ===
Jangipur subdivision is crowded with 52 census towns and as such it had to be presented in two location maps. One of the maps can be seen alongside. The subdivision is located in the Rarh region that is spread over from adjoining Santhal Pargana division of Jharkhand. The land is slightly higher in altitude than the surrounding plains and is gently undulating. The river Ganges, along with its distributaries, is prominent in both the maps. At the head of the subdivision is the 2,245 m long Farakka Barrage, one of the largest projects of its kind in the country. Murshidabad district shares with Bangladesh a porous international border which is notoriously crime prone (partly shown in this map). The subdivision has two large power plants - the 2,100 MW Farakka Super Thermal Power Station and the 1,600 MW Sagardighi Thermal Power Station. According to a 2016 report, there are around 1,000,000 (1 million/ ten lakh) workers engaged in the beedi industry in Jangipur subdivision. 90% are home-based and 70% of the home-based workers are women. As of 2013, an estimated 2.4 million people reside along the banks of the Ganges alone in Murshidabad district. Severe erosion occurs along the banks.

Note: The two maps present some of the notable locations in the subdivision. All places marked in the maps are linked in the larger full screen maps.

== Demographics ==
The population of Ahiran village, as per the 2011 Census by the Government of India, was 17,079 with 8,691 males and 8,388 females.

== Civic administration ==
=== CD block HQ ===
The headquarters of Suti I CD block are located at Ahiran.

=== Offices ===
Some of the government offices located in this area are: Suti I (community development block)

- B.D.O Office
- Sub Inspector Of Schools
- [Integrated Child Development Services] (ICDS)
- Suti I Block Youth Office
- B.L and L.R.O,
- Ahiran Hospital, Ahiran
- Post Office,
- Bangiya Gramin Vikash Bank,
- Bank of India,
- Office of the Assistant Director of Agriculture
- Ahrion electric bill collection office and mini electronic supply centers were established at Suti 1 block (WBSEDCL - AHIRAN CCC).

== Transport ==
- Ahiran is connected through NH 34 and Ahiran railway station is situated in Barharwa–Azimganj–Katwa loop line of Indian Railway.
- Ahiran Halt Bus Stop and
- Ahiran Haat Bus Stop.

== Education ==
The few schools situated in the village include the Ahiran Hemangini Vidyaytan School (H.S.), Ahiran Schinananda Girl High School and Bangabari High School.

- Ahiran Model School, Suti - I block.
- Aligarh Muslim University Center Murshidabad.
- CWSN Resource Room, a school for child with special needs.

== Healthcare ==
- Ahiran Primary Health Center, under the B.M.O.H. Ahiran BPHC Suti-1, Murshidabad, near Jangipur Sub-Divisional Hospital.
- Veterinary Dispensaries/ Hospital -BLDO Suti-1 Block Animal
