= West Bengal Council of Rabindra Open Schooling =

Open schooling council of India

- Abbreviation: WBCROS
- Established: 1 August 2001; 25 years ago
- Type: Governmental Organisation
- Headquarters: Bikash Bhavan (2nd Floor), East Block 2nd Floor‚ Salt Lake, Kolkata – 700091
- President: Dr. Amarendra Mahapatra
- Secretary: Dr. Namrata Kothari
- Website: wbcros.ac.in

The West Bengal Council of Rabindra Open Schooling is the board of education for distance education, which is administered by the Government of West Bengal.
