= Bahutali =

- Village
- Location in West Bengal, India Bahutali (India)
- Coordinates: 24.5714°N 87.8971°E
- Country: India
- State: West Bengal
- District: Murshidabad

Population (2011)
  - Total: 15,963

Languages
  - Official: Bengali, English
- Time zone: UTC+5:30 (IST)
- PIN: 731222
- ISO 3166 code: IN-WB
- Lok Sabha constituency: Jangipur
- Vidhan Sabha constituency: Suti
- Website: murshidabad.nic.in

Bahutali is a village and a gram panchayat in the Suti I CD block in the Jangipur subdivision of the Murshidabad district in the state of West Bengal, India.

== Geography ==
Bahutali is located at 24.5714°N 87.8971°E.

== Demographics ==
According to the 2011 Census of India, Bahutali had a total population of 15,963, of which 8,123 (51%) were males and 7,840 (49%) were females. Population in the age range 0–6 years was 3,388. The total number of literate persons in Bahutali was 6,021 (47.88% of the population over 6 years).

== Economy ==
The only bank in this area is a branch of Bank of India.

== Education ==
Schools

- Bahutali High School (H.S), Bahutali, Suti I.
- Bahutali Primary school
- Bahutali girls Junior High school
- Bahutali Snehalata Ghosh primary school

== Health ==
Bahutali (PHC code. FC0767) Primary Health Centre under suti I block.
