= Suti Assembly constituency =

Suti
- Constituency No. 57 for the West Bengal Legislative Assembly
- Interactive Map Outlining Suti Assembly Constituency

Constituency details
- Country: India
- Region: East India
- State: West Bengal
- District: Murshidabad
- Lok Sabha constituency: Jangipur
- Established: 1951
- Total electors: 265,418
- Reservation: None

Member of Legislative Assembly
- 18th West Bengal Legislative Assembly
- Incumbent Emani Biswas
- Party: DTC
- Elected year: 2026

Suti Assembly constituency is an assembly constituency in Murshidabad district in the Indian state of West Bengal.

== Overview ==
As per orders of the Delimitation Commission, No. 57 Suti Assembly constituency covers Suti II community development block and Bahutali, Harua and Sadikpur gram panchayats of Suti I community development block.

Suti Assembly constituency is part of No. 9 Jangipur Lok Sabha constituency.

== Members of the Legislative Assembly ==
Year	Name	Party
1951	Lutfal Haque	Independent
1957	Lutfal Haque	Indian National Congress
1962	Lutfal Haque	Indian National Congress
1967	S. Mahammad	Independent
1969	Mohammad Sohrab	Indian National Congress
1971	Mohammad Sohrab	Indian National Congress
1972	Shish Mohammad	Revolutionary Socialist Party
1977	Mohammad Sohrab	Indian National Congress
1982	Shish Mohammad	Revolutionary Socialist Party
1987	Shish Mohammad	Revolutionary Socialist Party
1991	Shish Mohammad	Revolutionary Socialist Party
1996	Mohammad Sohrab	Indian National Congress
2001	Jane Alam Mian	Revolutionary Socialist Party
2006	Jane Alam Mian	Revolutionary Socialist Party
2011	Emani Biswas	Indian National Congress
2016	Humayun Reza	Indian National Congress
2021	Emani Biswas	Trinamool Congress
2026	Emani Biswas	Trinamool Congress

== Election results ==
Vote share of Winning candidates
2026	36.83%
2021	58.87%
2016	44.64%
2011	48.87%
2006	46.90%
2001	38.93%
1996	40.24%
1991	38.05%
1987	46.19%
1982	52.85%
1977	33.65%
1972	49.21%
1971	38.15%
1969	50.26%
1967	54.19%
1962	56.08%
1957	51.46%
1951	31.57%

=== 2026 ===
2026 West Bengal Legislative Assembly election: Suti
Party	Candidate	Votes	%	±%
AITC	Emani Biswas	81,330	36.83	▼22.04
BJP	Mahabir Ghosh	68,973	31.23	▲5.04
INC	Alfajuddin Biswas	61,344	27.78	▲19.11
AIMIM	Mohammad Zaid	2,565	1.16	
NOTA	None of the above	1,735	0.79	▼0.47
Majority		12,357	5.6	▼27.08
Turnout		220,852	96.29	▲14.79
AITC hold		Swing		

=== 2021 ===
2021 West Bengal Legislative Assembly election: Suti
Party	Candidate	Votes	%	±%
AITC	Emani Biswas	127,351	58.87	▲16.33
BJP	Koushik Das	56,650	26.19	▲19.26
INC	Humayun Reza	18,760	8.67	▼35.97
Independent	Maidul Islam	8,006	3.7	
NOTA	None of the above	2,724	1.26	
Majority		70,701	32.68	
Turnout		216,328	81.5	
AITC gain from INC		Swing		

=== 2016 ===
2016 West Bengal Legislative Assembly election: Suti
Party	Candidate	Votes	%	±%
INC	Humayun Reza	84,017	44.64	▼4.23
AITC	Emani Biswas	80,067	42.54	New entry
BJP	Samrat Ghosh	13,051	6.93	▼1.93
RSP	Nezamuddin	3,991	2.12	▼35.17
WPI	Mahfujur Rahaman	2,588	1.37	New entry
NOTA	None of the above	2,401	1.28	New entry
Majority		3,950	2.10	▼9.48
Turnout		1,88,222	84.88	▼1.06
INC hold		Swing		

=== 2011 ===
2011 West Bengal Legislative Assembly election: Suti
Party	Candidate	Votes	%	±%
INC	Emani Biswas	73,465	48.87	
RSP	Jane Alam Mian	56,056	37.29	
BJP	Nilkanta Roy	13,314	8.86	
SDPI	Mahammad Rakim Sheikh	2,500	1.66	
SUCI(C)	Samiruddin	2,307	1.53	
Independent	Badirul Islam	1,654	1.10	
BSP	Sanjit Singha	1,041	0.69	
Majority		17,409	11.58	
Turnout		1,50,337	85.94	
INC gain from RSP		Swing		

=== 2006 ===
2006 West Bengal Legislative Assembly election: Suti
Party	Candidate	Votes	%	±%
RSP	Jane Alam Mian	61,605	46.90	
INC	Md. Sohrab	56,272	42.84	
BJP	Sasti Charan Ghosh	5,916	4.50	
Independent	Md. Samiruddin	3,876	2.95	
SP	Aneshur Rahaman	1,847	1.41	
Independent	Mainul Hoque	1,834	1.40	
Majority		5,333	4.06	
Turnout				
RSP hold		Swing		

=== 2001 ===
2001 West Bengal Legislative Assembly election: Suti
Party	Candidate	Votes	%	±%
RSP	Jane Alam Mian	45,368	38.93	
Independent	Md. Sahrab	40,748	34.97	
AITC	Shish Mohammad	14,171	12.16	
BJP	Samar Kumar Das	6,224	5.34	
Independent	Chitta Mukherjee	5,547	4.76	
Independent	Sarbeswar Mondal	2,900	2.49	
PDS	Enamul Kabir	1,578	1.35	
Majority		4,620	3.96	
Turnout		116,821	74.97	
Swing to RSP from INC		Swing		

=== 1996 ===
1996 West Bengal Legislative Assembly election: Suti
Party	Candidate	Votes	%	±%
INC	Md. Sohrab	46,800	40.24	
RSP	Shish Mohammad	46,369	39.87	
BJP	Chitta Mookherji	21,078	18.12	
Independent	Sukumar Sarkar	857	0.74	
Independent	Das Tilak	511	0.44	
Independent	Shaikh Tota	487	0.42	
Independent	Sekh Wajed	194	0.17	
Majority		431	0.37	
Turnout		122,200	77.39	
Swing to INC from RSP		Swing		

=== 1991 ===
1991 West Bengal Legislative Assembly election: Suti
Party	Candidate	Votes	%	±%
RSP	Shish Mahammad	36,418	38.05	
BJP	Chitta Mookherjee	29,164	30.47	
INC	Hossain Ali	27,992	29.25	
Independent	Bijoy Kumar Das	811	0.85	
JP	Mahatab	586	0.61	
BSP	Jagannath Mandal	513	0.54	
Independent	Alauddin	216	0.23	
Majority		7,254	7.58	
Turnout		99,103	75.24	
RSP hold		Swing		

=== 1987 ===
1987 West Bengal Legislative Assembly election: Suti
Party	Candidate	Votes	%	±%
RSP	Shish Mohammad	38,329	46.19	
INC	Md Sohorab	35,057	42.25	
BJP	Gopal Das	6,753	8.14	
SUCI(C)	Bijoy Kumar Das	1,832	2.21	
IUML	Biswas Wazed Ali	1,004	1.21	
Majority		3,272	3.94	
Turnout		84,380	73.62	
RSP hold		Swing		

=== 1982 ===
1982 West Bengal Legislative Assembly election: Suti
Party	Candidate	Votes	%	±%
RSP	Shish Mohammad	40,175	52.85	
INC	Md. Sohorab	32,140	42.28	
BJP	Sarkar Sudhangshu Sekhar	2,897	3.81	
Independent	Samarendra Das	803	1.06	
Majority		8,035	10.57	
Turnout		77,614	78.52	
Swing to RSP from INC		Swing		

=== 1977 ===
1977 West Bengal Legislative Assembly election: Suti
Party	Candidate	Votes	%	±%
INC	Md. Sohorab	18,442	33.65	
RSP	Shish Mohammad	16,304	29.75	
JP	Anil Kumar Das	14,806	27.02	
Independent	Umapati Mandal	5,060	9.23	
Independent	Asrafuddin Biswas	194	0.35	
Majority		2,138	3.90	
Turnout		55,872	70.59	
Swing to INC from RSP		Swing		

=== 1972 ===
1972 West Bengal Legislative Assembly election: Suti
Party	Candidate	Votes	%	±%
RSP	Shish Mohammad	27,085	49.21	
INC	Md Sohrab	25,565	46.45	
Independent	Sarker Benoy Bhusan	2,388	4.34	
Majority		1,520	2.76	
Turnout		56,836	63.72	
Swing to RSP from INC		Swing		

=== 1971 ===
1971 West Bengal Legislative Assembly election: Suti
Party	Candidate	Votes	%	±%
INC	Md. Sohrab	19,504	38.15	
RSP	Shish Mohammad	16,472	32.22	
Independent	Sarkar Bonoy Bhusan	5,598	10.95	
Independent	Biswas Sah Mohammad	5,092	9.96	
SUCI	Habibur Rahman	2,302	4.50	
Independent	Yfad Ali	1,396	2.73	
Independent	Abul Kalam	467	0.91	
Independent	Ekari Gopal Sarkar	300	0.59	
Majority		3,032	5.93	
Turnout		55,433	63.38	
INC hold		Swing		

=== 1969 ===
1969 West Bengal Legislative Assembly election: Suti
Party	Candidate	Votes	%	±%
INC	Md. Sohorab	28,252	50.26	
RSP	Shish Mohammad	27,962	49.74	
Majority		290	0.52	
Turnout		58,578	73.47	
Swing to INC from Independent		Swing		

=== 1967 ===
1967 West Bengal Legislative Assembly election: Suti
Party	Candidate	Votes	%	±%
Independent	S. Mahammad	28,925	54.19	
INC	M. Soharab	24,452	45.81	
Majority		4,473	8.38	
Turnout		57,043	70.82	
Swing to Independent from INC		Swing		

=== 1962 ===
1962 West Bengal Legislative Assembly election: Suti
Party	Candidate	Votes	%	±%
INC	Lutfal Hoque	28,878	56.08	
RSP	Shish Mohammad	22,612	43.92	
Majority		6,266	12.16	
Turnout		54,777	69.77	
INC hold		Swing		

=== 1957 ===
1957 West Bengal Legislative Assembly election: Suti
Party	Candidate	Votes	%	±%
INC	Lutfal Hoque	27,063	51.46	
Independent	Dukhu Lal Das	23,889	45.42	
PSP	Satyaban Das	957	1.82	
Independent	Eshanuddin Ahamod Shaikh	685	1.30	
Majority		3,174	6.04	
Turnout		52,594	77.76	
Swing to INC from Independent		Swing		

=== 1951 ===
1951 West Bengal Legislative Assembly election: Suti (SC)
Party	Candidate	Votes	%	±%
Independent	Lutfal Haque	9,186	31.57	
INC	Jharu Lal Das	9,080	31.20	
Independent	Radhanath Choudhuri	6,381	21.93	
KMPP	Tinkari Lal Das	4,176	14.35	
Independent	Dwijendra Nath Sinha	278	0.96	
Majority		106	0.37	
Turnout		29,101	46.78	
Independent win (new seat)				
