= Md. Sohrab =

Indian politician

Member of Legislative Assembly
- In office 1969-1971, 1971-1972, 1977-1982, 1996-2001
- Constituency: Suti

Member of Legislative Assembly
- In office 2011–2016
- Constituency: Jangipur

Personal details
- Born: 8 July 1932 (age 93)
- Party: Indian National Congress

Md. Sohrab is a Congress politician, five-time MLA and Congress legislature party leader in the West Bengal state assembly.

== Personal life ==
Md. Sohrab, son of Yar Mohammad, is a post-graduate and is a retired head-teacher.

== Political career ==
He was elected to the West Bengal state assembly from Suti (Vidhan Sabha constituency) in 1969, 1971, 1977 and 1996, as a Congress candidate.

When he was not given a party ticket to contest in 2001, he filed his nomination in the same constituency as a rebel candidate and lost. At that Adhir Ranjan Chowdhury, who has a reputation for sponsoring rebels, commented, "Do you expect my former mastermoshai Md Sohrab (rebel candidate from Suti) and five-time MLA Habibur Rahman (rebel candidate from Jangipur) to listen to me?"

In 2011, he won from Jangipur (Vidhan Sabha constituency) and was Congress legislature party leader. He joined All India Trinamool Congress in 2016.
