= Suti I =

- Community development block
- Interactive map of Suti I
- Coordinates: 24.510412°N 88.029329°E
- Country: India
- State: West Bengal
- District: Murshidabad

Government
  - Type: Federal democracy
  - Administrative Division: Malda
  - Headquarters: Ahiran

Area
  - Total: 138.84 km^{2} (53.61 sq mi)
- Elevation: 25 m (82 ft)

Population (2011)
  - Total: 179,908
  - Density: 1,295.8/km^{2} (3,356.1/sq mi)

Languages
  - Official: Bengali, English

Literacy
  - Literacy (2011): 58.40%
- Time zone: UTC+5:30 (IST)
- PIN: 742234 (Ahiran); 742223(Jangipur Barrage)
- Telephone/STD code: 03483
- ISO 3166 code: IN-WB
- Vehicle registration: WB-57, WB-58
- Lok Sabha constituency: Jangipur
- Vidhan Sabha constituency: Suti, Jangipur, Raghunathganj
- Website: murshidabad.nic.in

Suti I is a community development block that forms an administrative division in the Jangipur subdivision of Murshidabad district in the Indian state of West Bengal.

== Geography ==
Suti I is located at 24°30′37″N 88°01′46″E

Suti I CD block lies in the Rarh region in Murshidabad district. The Bhagirathi River splits the district into two natural physiographic regions – Rarh on the west and Bagri on the east. The Padma River separates Murshidabad district from Malda district and Chapai Nawabganj and Rajshahi districts of Bangladesh in the north. The Rarh region is undulating and contains mostly clay and lateritic clay based soil. As the Rajmahal hills slopes gently down from adjoining Jharkhand it forms the Nabagram plain at the lowest edge of its elevation in this region. The eastern slope of the region is characterised by the existence of numerous cliffs and bluffs.

Suti I CD block is bounded by Suti II CD block in the north, Chapai Nawabganj Sadar Upazila in Chapai Nawabganj District of Bangladesh, across the Ganges, in the east, Raghunathganj I and Raghunathganj II CD blocks in the south, and Maheshpur and Pakuria CD blocks in Pakur district of Jharkhand in the west.

Murshidabad district has a 125.35 km long international border with Bangladesh of which 42.35 km is on land and the remaining is riverine. There are 9 blocks – Samserganj, Suti I, Suti II, Raghunathganj II, Lalgola, Bhagawangola I, Bhagawangola II, Raninagar II and Jalangi - along the Bangladesh-India border.

The Rarh region or the western part of the district is drained by the right bank tributaries of the Bhagirathi, flowing down from the hilly / plateau region of Santhal Pargana division in neighbouring Jharkhand. The Farakka Barrage regulates the flow of water into the Bhagirathi through the feeder canal. Thereafter, it is fed with the discharge from the Mayurakshi system. About 1,800 km^{2} of area in the neighbourhood of Kandi town is flooded by the combined discharge of the Mayurakshi, Dwarka, Brahmani, Gambhira, Kopai and Bakreshwar – the main contributor being the Mayurakshi. Certain other areas in the western sector also get flooded.

The 38.38 km long feeder canal takes off upstream of the Farakka Barrage and links with the Bhagirathi River just below the Jangipur Barrage. The feeder canal was constructed across the flow of the small flashy rivers such as Gumani, Trimohini and Kanloi. The discharges of the Trimohini and Kanloi were designed to flow into the feeder canal, and whenever the discharges of these rivers exceed the design capacity, they cause problems. The discharge of the Bagmari was designed to flow into the Ganga along its course through a siphone across the feeder canal. With the choking of the outlet to the Ganges, the flood discharge spills over to the basins of the Pagla and the Bansloi and floods around 100 km^{2}

A major problem in Murshidabad district is river bank erosion. As of 2013, an estimated 2.4 million people reside along the banks of the Ganges alone in Murshidabad district. Between 1931 and 1977, 26,769 hectares have been eroded and many villages have been fully submerged. 1980-1990 was a decade of erosion for this district and during the decade Giria, Sekhalipur, Khejustala, Mithipur, Fajilpur, Rajapur, Akheriganj, Parashpur villages were badly affected.

See also - River bank erosion along the Ganges in Malda and Murshidabad districts

Suti I CD block has an area of 143.68 km^{2}. It has 1 panchayat samity, 6 gram panchayats, 106 gram sansads (village councils), 61 mouzas and 46 inhabited villages. Suti police station serves this block. Headquarters of this CD block is at Ahiran.

Gram panchayats in Suti I block/ panchayat samiti are: Ahiran, Bahutali, Bansabati, Harua, Nurpur and Sadikpur.

== Demographics ==
=== Population ===
According to the 2011 Census of India, Suti I CD block had a total population of 179,908, of which 150,803 were rural and 29,105 were urban. There were 91,905 (51%) males and 88,803 (49%) females. Population in the age range 0–6 years was 31,398. Scheduled Castes numbered 25,860 (14.37%) and Scheduled Tribes numbered 261 (0.15%).

As per 2001 census, Suti I block has a total population of 139,419, out of which 70,554 were males and 68,865 were females. Suti I block registered a population growth of 25.03 per cent during the 1991-2001 decade. Decadal growth for the district was 23.70 per cent. Decadal growth in West Bengal was 17.84 per cent.

Decadal Population Growth Rate (%)

- Suti I CD block
- Murshidabad district
- West Bengal

The decadal growth of population in Suti I CD block in 2001-2011 was 29.02%.

In the Murshidabad district, the population grew at a decadal growth rate of 33.5% from 1951 to 1961, 28.6% from 1961 to 1971, 25.5% from 1971 to 1981, 28.2% from 1981 to 1991, 23.8% from 1991 to 2001, and 21.1% from 2001 to 2011. The decadal growth rate for West Bengal in 2001-11 was 13.93%.

The decadal growth rate of population in neighbouring Chapai Nawabganj District in Bangladesh was 15.59% for the decade 2001–2011, down from 21.67% in the decade 1991–2001.

There are reports of Bangladeshi infiltrators entering Murshidabad district.

=== Census towns and villages ===
Census towns in Suti I CD block were (2011 population figures in brackets): Madna (6,312), Ramakantapur (6,347), Nayabahadurpur (9,239) and Fatellapur (7,207).

Large villages in Suti I CD block were (2011 population figures in brackets): Kadoa (5,159), Bahutali (15,963), Sidhari (5,362), Hilora (7,667), Raturi (4,518), Bansabati (6,378), Gambhira (7,097), Harua (9,012), Gotha (4,486), Fatehpur (4,875), Fatullapur (4,291), Sadikpur (5,245), Ghorapakhiagangin (4,550), Ahiran (17,079), Alampur (4,206) and Ajagarpara (4,521).

=== Literacy ===
As per the 2011 census, the total number of literate persons in Suti I CD block was 86,225 (58.06% of the population over 6 years) out of which males numbered 47,623 (62.84% of the male population over 6 years) and females numbered 38,602 (53.08% of the female population over 6 years). The gender disparity (the difference between female and male literacy rates) was 9.76%.

See also – List of West Bengal districts ranked by literacy rate

Literacy in CD blocks of
Murshidabad district
Jangipur subdivision
Farakka – 59.75%
Samserganj – 54.98%
Suti I – 58.40%
Suti II – 55.23%
Raghunathganj I – 64.49%
Raghunathganj II – 61.17%
Sagardighi – 65.27%
Lalbag subdivision
Murshidabad-Jiaganj – 69.14%
Bhagawangola I - 57.22%
Bhagawangola II – 53.48%
Lalgola– 64.32%
Nabagram – 70.83%
Sadar subdivision
Berhampore – 73.51%
Beldanga I – 70.06%
Beldanga II – 67.86%
Hariharpara – 69.20%
Naoda – 66.09%
Kandi subdivision
Kandi – 65.13%
Khargram – 63.56%
Burwan – 68.96%
Bharatpur I – 62.93%
Bharatpur II – 66.07%
Domkol subdivision
Domkal – 55.89%
Raninagar I – 57.81%
Raninagar II – 54.81%
Jalangi – 58.73%
Source: 2011 Census: CD Block Wise
Primary Census Abstract Data

=== Language and religion ===
Religion in Suti I CD block (2011)
Islam	58.15%
Hinduism	41.62%
Other or not stated	0.23%

In the 2011 census, Muslims numbered 104,616 and formed 58.15% of the population in Suti I CD block. Hindus numbered 74,884 and formed 41.62% of the population. Others numbered 408 and formed 0.23% of the population. In Suti I and Suti II CD blocks taken together, while the proportion of Muslims increased from 60.93% in 1991 to 63.73% in 2001, the proportion of Hindus declined from 39.02% in 1991 to 36.07% in 2001.

Murshidabad district had 4,707,573 Muslims who formed 66.27% of the population, 2,359,061 Hindus who formed 33.21% of the population, and 37, 173 persons belonging to other religions who formed 0.52% of the population, in the 2011 census. While the proportion of Muslim population in the district increased from 61.40% in 1991 to 63.67% in 2001, the proportion of Hindu population declined from 38.39% in 1991 to 35.92% in 2001.

Murshidabad was the only Muslim majority district in West Bengal at the time of partition of India in 1947. The proportion of Muslims in the population of Murshidabad district in 1951 was 55.24%. The Radcliffe Line had placed Muslim majority Murshidabad in India and the Hindu majority Khulna in Pakistan, in order to maintain the integrity of the Ganges river system In India.

Languages of Suti I CD block (2011)
1. Bengali (95.8%)
2. Khotta (4.07%)
3. Others (0.11%)

At the time of the 2011 census, 95.82% of the population spoke Bengali and 4.07% Khotta as their first language.

== Rural poverty ==
As per the Human Development Report 2004 for West Bengal, the rural poverty ratio in Murshidabad district was 46.12%. Purulia, Bankura and Birbhum districts had higher rural poverty ratios. These estimates were based on Central Sample data of NSS 55th round 1999–2000.

== Economy ==
=== Livelihood ===
Livelihood
in Suti I CD block
1. Cultivators (7.02%)
2. Agricultural labourers (25.7%)
3. Household industries (35.9%)
4. Other Workers (31.4%)

In Suti I CD block in 2011, amongst the class of total workers, cultivators numbered 5,540 and formed 7.02%, agricultural labourers numbered 20,268 and formed 25.69%, household industry workers numbered 28,330 and formed 35.90% and other workers numbered 24,765 and formed 31.39%.

=== Infrastructure ===
There are 46 inhabited villages in Suti I CD block. 100% villages have power supply and 45 villages (76.09%) have drinking water supply. 13 villages (28.26%) have post offices. 40 villages (86.96%) have telephones (including landlines, public call offices and mobile phones). 27 villages (58.70%) have a pucca approach road and 23 villages (50.00%) have transport communication (includes bus service, rail facility and navigable waterways). 7 villages (15.22%) have agricultural credit societies and 5 villages (10.07%) have banks.

=== Agriculture ===
From 1977 onwards major land reforms took place in West Bengal. Land in excess of land ceiling was acquired and distributed amongst the peasants. Following land reforms land ownership pattern has undergone transformation. In 2013–14, persons engaged in agriculture in Suti I CD block could be classified as follows: bargadars 872 (2.07%,) patta (document) holders 6,337 (15.02%), small farmers (possessing land between 1 and 2 hectares) 3,069 (7.28%), marginal farmers (possessing land up to 1 hectare) 11,635 (27.58%) and agricultural labourers 20,268 (48.05%).

Suti I CD block had 25 fertiliser depots and 37 fair price shops in 2013–14.

In 2013–14, Suti I CD block produced 2,103 tonnes of Aman paddy, the main winter crop from 748 hectares, 988 tonnes of Boro paddy (spring crop) from 368 hectares, 122 tonnes of wheat from 57 hectares, 16,314 tonnes of jute from 871 hectares, 3,796 tonnes of potatoes from 154 hectares and 1,359 tonnes of sugar cane from 19 hectares. It also produced pulses and oilseeds.

In 2013–14, the total area irrigated in Suti I CD block was 4,521 hectares, out of which 1,360 hectares were irrigated with canal water, 1,050 hectares with tank water, 91 hectares with river lift irrigation, 20 hectares with deep tube wells and 2,000 hectares by other means.

=== Beedi industry ===
As of 2003, around 400,000 workers were engaged in the prime area locations of beedi making, a household industry, in Farakka, Samserganj, Suti I, Suti II, Raghunathganj I and Raghunathganj II CD blocks. The majority of those working are women and children. Almost all households are engaged in this activity.

=== Silk and handicrafts ===
Murshidabad is famous for its silk industry since the Middle Ages. There are three distinct categories in this industry, namely (1) Mulberry cultivation and silkworm rearing (2) Peeling of raw silk (3) Weaving of silk fabrics.

Ivory carving is an important cottage industry from the era of the Nawabs. The main areas where this industry has flourished are Khagra and Jiaganj. 99% of ivory craft production is exported. In more recent years sandalwood etching has become more popular than ivory carving. Bell metal and Brass utensils are manufactured in large quantities at Khagra, Berhampore, Kandi and Jangipur.

=== Banking ===
In 2013–14, Suti I CD block had offices of 4 commercial banks and 3 gramin banks.

=== Power supply ===
Ahrion electric bill collection office and mini electronic power supply centers were established at Suti 1 block (WBSEDCL - AHIRAN CCC)

=== Backward Regions Grant Fund ===
Murshidabad district is listed as a backward region and receives financial support from the Backward Regions Grant Fund. The fund, created by the Government of India, is designed to redress regional imbalances in development. As of 2012, 272 districts across the country were listed under this scheme. The list includes 11 districts of West Bengal.

== Transport ==
Suti I CD block has 11 ferry services and 2 originating/ terminating bus routes.

The Barharwa-Azimganj-Katwa loop line passes through this block and there is a station at Ahiran.

National Highway 12 (old number NH 34) passes through this block.

== Education ==
In 2013–14, Suti I CD block had 73 primary schools with 14,215 students, 6 middle schools with 826 students, 1 high school with 664 students and 9 higher secondary schools with 21,609 students. Suti I CD block had 310 institutions special and non-formal education with 15,038 students.

In Suti I CD block, amongst the 46 inhabited villages, 3 villages did not have a school, 22 villages have more than 1 primary school, 18 villages have at least 1 primary and 1 middle school and 11 villages had at least 1 middle and 1 secondary school.

Schools

- Ahiran Hemangini Vidyaytan School (H.S.), Ahiran,
- Ahiran Schinananda Girl High School, Ahiran,
- Bangabari High School - H.S,
- Bahutali High School, Bahutali,
- Banshabati High School, Bansabati,
- Gotha A. Rahman High School,
- Harowa High School, Harua,
- Nayagram Y. M. High School, &
- Sadikpur B.K. High School, Sadikpur.
- Ahiran Model School, Ahiran - Suti I

== Healthcare ==
In 2014, Suti I CD block had 1 block primary health centre and 2 primary health centres, with total 35 beds and 4 doctors (excluding private bodies). It had 22 family welfare subcentres. 6,246 patients were treated indoor and 123,665 patients were treated outdoor in the hospitals, health centres and subcentres of the CD Block.

Suti I CD Block has Ahiran block Primary Health Centre at Ahiran (with 15 beds), Bahutali Primary Health Centre (with 10 beds) and Hilora PHC (with 10 beds).

Suti I CD block is one of the areas of Murshidabad district where ground water is affected by a high level of arsenic contamination. The WHO guideline for arsenic in drinking water is 10 mg/ litre, and the Indian Standard value is 50 mg/ litre. All but one of the 26 blocks of Murshidabad district have arsenic contamination above the WHO level, all but two of the blocks have arsenic concentration above the Indian Standard value and 17 blocks have arsenic concentration above 300 mg/litre. The maximum concentration in Suti I CD block is 700 mg/litre.
