= Jangipur, West Bengal Assembly constituency =

Jangipur
- Constituency No. 58 for the West Bengal Legislative Assembly
- Interactive Map Outlining Jangipur Assembly Constituency

Constituency details
- Country: India
- Region: East India
- State: West Bengal
- District: Murshidabad
- Lok Sabha constituency: Jangipur
- Established: 1957
- Total electors: 2,20,859
- Reservation: None

Member of Legislative Assembly
- 18th West Bengal Legislative Assembly
- Incumbent Chitta Mukherjee
- Party: BJP
- Alliance: NDA
- Elected year: 2026

Jangipur Assembly constituency is an assembly constituency in Murshidabad district in the Indian state of West Bengal.

== Overview ==
As per orders of the Delimitation Commission, No. 58 Jangipur Assembly constituency covers Jangipur municipality, Raghunathganj I community development block and Ahiran and Bansabati gram panchayats of Suti I community development block.

Jangipur Assembly constituency is part of No. 9 Jangipur Lok Sabha constituency.

== Members of the Legislative Assembly ==
Year	Member	Party
1957	Shyamapada Bhattacharya	Indian National Congress
1957	Kuber Chand Halder	Indian National Congress
1962	Muktipada Chatterjee	Indian National Congress
1967	Abdul Haque	Independent
1969	Abdul Haque	Revolutionary Socialist Party
1971	Radaruddin Ahammad	Independent
1972	Habibur Rahman	Indian National Congress
1977	Habibur Rahman	Indian National Congress
1982	Habibur Rahman	Indian National Congress
1987	Habibur Rahman	Indian National Congress
1991	Abdul Haque	Revolutionary Socialist Party
1996	Habibur Rahman	Indian National Congress
2001	Abul Hasnat	Revolutionary Socialist Party
2006	Abul Hasnat	Revolutionary Socialist Party
2011	Mohammad Sohrab	Indian National Congress
2016	Jakir Hossain	Trinamool Congress
2021	Jakir Hossain	Trinamool Congress
2026	Chitta Mukherjee	Bharatiya Janata Party

== Election results ==
Vote share of Winning candidates
2026	42.90%
2021	68.82%
2016	37.23%
2011	46.76%
2006	48.55%
2001	42.78%
1996	46.36%
1991	42.88%
1987	46.22%
1982	45.29%
1977	42.14%
1972	42.33%
1971	27.12%
1969	51.27%
1967	62.58%
1962	37.81%
1957	21.48%
1957	17.48%

=== 2026 ===
2026 West Bengal Legislative Assembly election: Jangipur
Party	Candidate	Votes	%	±%
BJP	Chitta Mukherjee	91,201	42.90	▲20.73
AITC	Jakir Hossain	80,659	37.94	▼30.88
INC	Mohammad Imran	31,228	14.69	
CPI(M)	Alok Kumar Das	4,007	1.88	
NOTA	None of the above	1,143	0.54	▼1.76
Majority		10,542	4.96	▼41.69
Turnout		212,606	96.11	▲18.38
BJP gain from AITC		Swing		

=== 2021 ===
2021 West Bengal Legislative Assembly election: Jangipur
Party	Candidate	Votes	%	±%
AITC	Jakir Hossain	136,444	68.82	▲31.59
BJP	Sujit Das	43,964	22.17	▲9.23
RSP	Jane Alam Mian	9,067	4.57	
NOTA	None of the above	4,557	2.3	
Majority		92,480	46.65	
Turnout		198,263	77.73	
AITC hold		Swing		

=== 2016 ===
2016 West Bengal Legislative Assembly election: Jangipur
Party	Candidate	Votes	%	±%
AITC	Jakir Hossain	66,869	37.23	New entry
CPI(M)	Somnath Singha Ray	46,236	25.75	▼16.70
INC	Mohammad Sohrab	34,863	19.41	▼27.35
BJP	Sudhan Kumar Das	23,240	12.94	▲4.90
NOTA	None of the above	2,853	1.59	New entry
Majority		20,633	11.48	▲7.17
Turnout		1,79,588	83.75	▼1.81
AITC gain from INC		Swing		

=== 2011 ===
2011 West Bengal Legislative Assembly election: Jangipur
Party	Candidate	Votes	%	±%
INC	Mohammad Sohrab	68,699	46.76	
CPI(M)	Purnima Bhattacharya	62,363	42.45	
BJP	Anamitra Banerjee	11,804	8.04	
SUCI(C)	Mirza Nashiruddin	4,038	2.75	
Majority		6,336	4.31	
Turnout		1,46,904	85.56	
INC gain from RSP		Swing		

=== 2006 ===
2006 West Bengal Legislative Assembly election: Jangipur
Party	Candidate	Votes	%	±%
RSP	Abul Hasnat	61,142	48.55	
INC	Habibur Rahaman	47,935	38.06	
Independent	Mirza Nashiruddin	3,994	3.17	
AITC	Sk. Md. Furkan	3,779	3.00	
BSP	Abul Alam	3,580	2.84	
Independent	Najrul Islam	2,081	1.65	
SP	Ajit Kumar Halder	1,999	1.59	
Independent	Abul Kasem	948	0.75	
Majority		13,207	10.49	
Turnout		125,946		
RSP hold		Swing		

=== 2001 ===
2001 West Bengal Legislative Assembly election: Jangipur
Party	Candidate	Votes	%	±%
RSP	Abul Hasnat	49,132	42.78	
Independent	Habibur Rahaman	30,068	26.18	
AITC	Sekh Md. Furkan	20,977	18.27	
BJP	Joydeb Das	5,974	5.20	
PDS	Md. Giasuddin	4,169	3.63	
Independent	Mirza Nasiruddin	3,368	2.93	
IUML	Abdus Samad	1,151	1.00	
Majority		19,064	16.60	
Turnout		114,894	69.71	
Swing to RSP from INC		Swing		

=== 1996 ===
1996 West Bengal Legislative Assembly election: Jangipur
Party	Candidate	Votes	%	±%
INC	Habibur Rahaman	58,181	46.36	
RSP	Abdul Haque	57,490	45.81	
BJP	Hariranjan Sarkar	5,744	4.58	
Independent	Anuradha (Banerjee) Mondal	2,895	2.31	
Independent	Kasim Ali	506	0.40	
Independent	Sen Sukumar	371	0.30	
Independent	Nazmul Hoque	322	0.26	
Majority		691	0.55	
Turnout		129,716	87.96	
Swing to INC from RSP		Swing		

=== 1991 ===
1991 West Bengal Legislative Assembly election: Jangipur
Party	Candidate	Votes	%	±%
RSP	Abdul Haque	40,482	42.88	
INC	Khabibur Rahaman	31,059	32.90	
BJP	Hari Ranjan Sarkar	18,431	19.52	
Independent	Mrinal Banerjee	2,281	2.42	
JP	Asrafull	772	0.82	
BSP	Abdul Matin	768	0.81	
Independent	Abdur Rahaman	449	0.48	
IUML	Khairul Lbasar	164	0.17	
Majority		9,423	9.98	
Turnout		97,972	67.99	
Swing to RSP from INC		Swing		

=== 1987 ===
1987 West Bengal Legislative Assembly election: Jangipur
Party	Candidate	Votes	%	±%
INC	Habibur Rahaman	38,463	46.22	
RSP	Abdul Haque	36,948	44.39	
SUCI	Achintya Singha	6,324	7.60	
IUML	Abu Khaled	763	0.92	
Independent	Mainal Kanti Ghose	728	0.87	
Majority		1,515	1.83	
Turnout		84,589	67.44	
INC hold		Swing		

=== 1982 ===
1982 West Bengal Legislative Assembly election: Jangipur
Party	Candidate	Votes	%	±%
INC	Habibur Rahaman	34,358	45.29	
Independent	Badaruddin Ahmed	24,773	32.66	
SUCI	Achintya Singha	13,036	17.18	
RSP	Asrafuddin Biswas	3,237	4.27	
Independent	Sk. Kamaluddin	458	0.60	
Majority		9,585	12.63	
Turnout		77,547	72.96	
INC hold		Swing		

=== 1977 ===
1977 West Bengal Legislative Assembly election: Jangipur
Party	Candidate	Votes	%	±%
INC	Habibur Rahaman	21,395	42.14	
SUCI	Achintya Singha	11,850	23.34	
Independent	Ashraf Hossain	8,964	17.66	
RSP	Mrinmoy Bagchi	3,740	7.37	
JP	Anisur Rahaman	2,447	4.82	
Independent	T. A. Nuran Nabi	2,245	4.42	
IUML	Md. Kamaluddin	129	0.25	
Majority		9,545	18.80	
Turnout		52,095	62.11	
INC hold		Swing		

=== 1972 ===
1972 West Bengal Legislative Assembly election: Jangipur
Party	Candidate	Votes	%	±%
INC	Rahaman Habibur	17,035	42.33	
SUCI	Achintya Singha	14,292	35.52	
Independent	Chattopadhyay Muktipada	4,816	11.97	
IUML	Badaruddin Ahammad	4,099	10.19	
Majority		2,743	6.81	
Turnout		42,075	50.58	
Swing to INC from Independent		Swing		

=== 1971 ===
1971 West Bengal Legislative Assembly election: Jangipur
Party	Candidate	Votes	%	±%
Independent	Badaruddin Ahammad	9,779	27.12	
INC	Asraf Hossain	9,168	25.43	
RSP	Abdul Haquf	6,453	17.90	
SUCI	Achivtya Singha	5,552	15.40	
INC(O)	Prasanta Chattopadhya	1,722	4.78	
Independent	Joyanta Kumar Das	1,599	4.44	
Independent	Mundra Rajaram	1,204	3.34	
Independent	Ashutosh Nom	575	1.59	
Majority		611	1.69	
Turnout		39,480	48.55	
Swing to Independent from RSP		Swing		

=== 1969 ===
1969 West Bengal Legislative Assembly election: Jangipur
Party	Candidate	Votes	%	±%
RSP	Abdul Haque	22,368	51.27	
INC	Muktipada Chattapadhaya	20,015	45.87	
ABJS	Das Kalipada	1,247	2.86	
Majority		2,353	5.40	
Turnout		44,946	61.14	
Swing to RSP from Independent		Swing		

=== 1967 ===
1967 West Bengal Legislative Assembly election: Jangipur
Party	Candidate	Votes	%	±%
Independent	A. Haque	26,978	62.58	
INC	M. Chattopadhyay	16,129	37.42	
Majority		10,849	25.16	
Turnout		46,708	62.98	
Swing to Independent from INC		Swing		

=== 1962 ===
1962 West Bengal Legislative Assembly election: Jangipur
Party	Candidate	Votes	%	±%
INC	Muktipada Chatterjee	10,169	37.81	
Independent	Abdul Hoque	8,853	32.92	
Independent	Badaruddin Ahmmad	4,239	15.76	
Independent	Ramapati Chhottopadhyay	3,635	13.52	
Majority		1,316	4.89	
Turnout		28,737	47.90	
INC hold		Swing		

=== 1957 ===
1957 West Bengal Legislative Assembly election: Jangirpur (SC)
Party	Candidate	Votes	%	±%
INC	Kuber Chand Haldar	16,973	21.48	
INC	Shyamapada Bhattacharjee	13,811	17.48	
Independent	Mukti Pa. Chatterji	11,730	14.85	
PSP	Alimuzzaman Shaikh	7,797	9.87	
PSP	Chandi Charan Halder	6,388	8.08	
Independent	Badaruddin Ahmmad	6,182	7.82	
Independent	Debabrata Ghoshal	5,008	6.34	
Independent	Nani Roy	3,581	4.53	
Independent	Bankim Chandra Singha	1,878	2.38	
Independent	Mir Zubaid Ali	1,772	2.24	
Independent	Dwarka Nath Barman	1,770	2.24	
Independent	Abdul Majid Biswas	1,410	1.78	
Independent	Seheba Hamda	713	0.90	
Majority		3,162	4.00	
Turnout		79,013	70.62	
INC win (new seat)				
