= Santhal Pargana division =

Division of Jharkhand, India

Santal Pargana division
- Division of Jharkhand
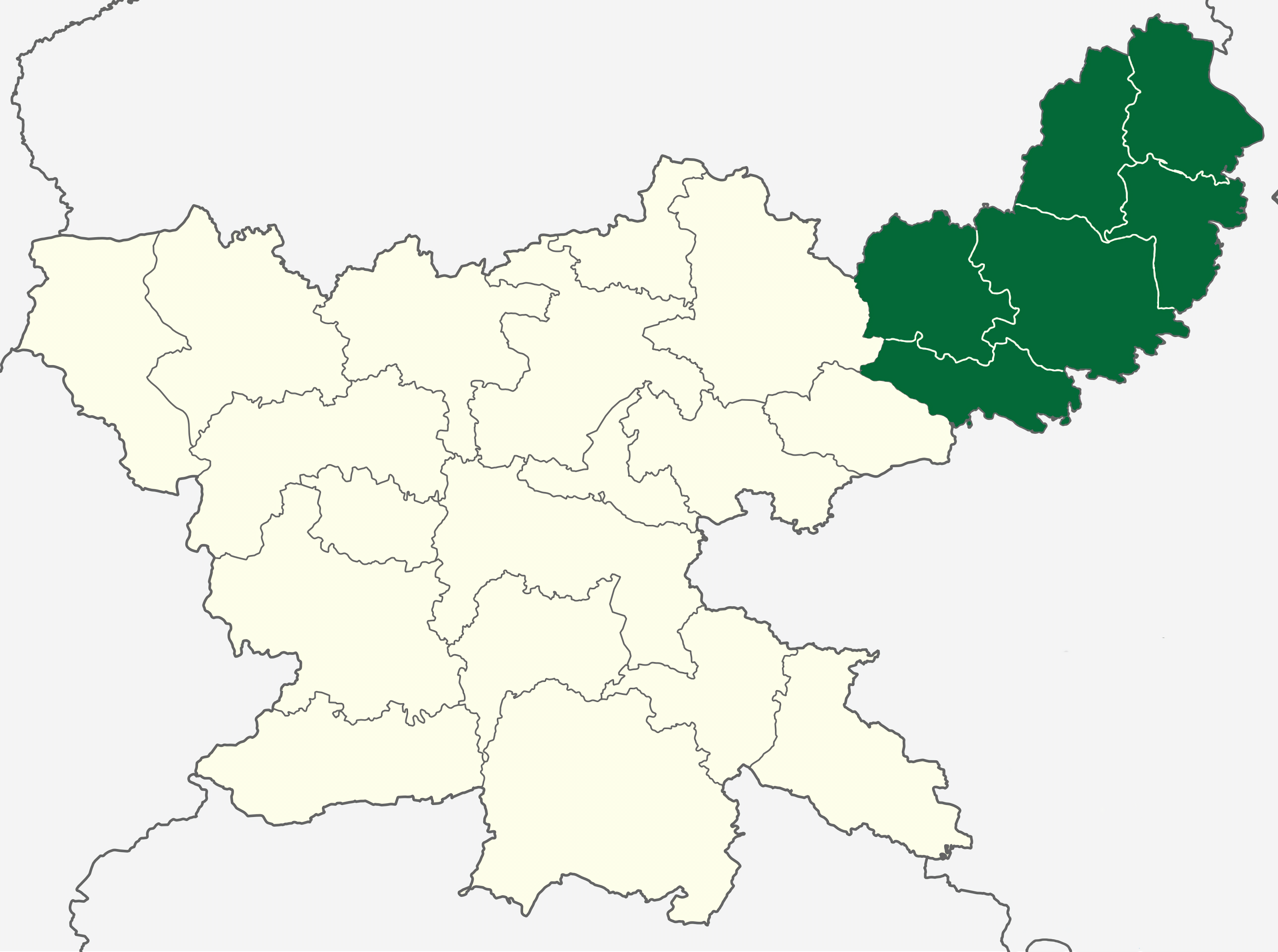
- Location of Santhal Pargana in Jharkhand
- Coordinates: 24°30′N 87°30′E
- Country: India
- State: Jharkhand
- Established: 1983
- Headquarters: Dumka
- Districts: Godda, Deoghar, Dumka, Jamtara, Sahibganj, Pakur

Government
  - Commissioner: Sri Shailendra Kumar Lal (IAS)
  - DIG: Shri Amber Lakra (IPS)

Area
  - Total: 12,601 km^{2} (4,865 sq mi)

Population (2011)
  - Total: 6,969,097
  - Density: 553.06/km^{2} (1,432.4/sq mi)

Santhal Pargana division is an administrative division of the Indian state of Jharkhand. The division comprises six districts and serves as a key administrative unit of the state. It is overseen by a Divisional Commissioner, while law and order is managed by the Deputy Inspector General of Police (DIG).

== Origin of name ==
Santal Pargana derives its name from two words: "Santal", a major inhabited tribe in the region and Pargana, a unit of administration in Persian language used mostly by medieval rulers.

== Location ==
Santal Pargana is one of the divisions of Jharkhand. Its headquarters is at Dumka. Presently, this administrative division comprises six districts: Godda, Deoghar, Dumka, Jamtara, Sahibganj and Pakur.

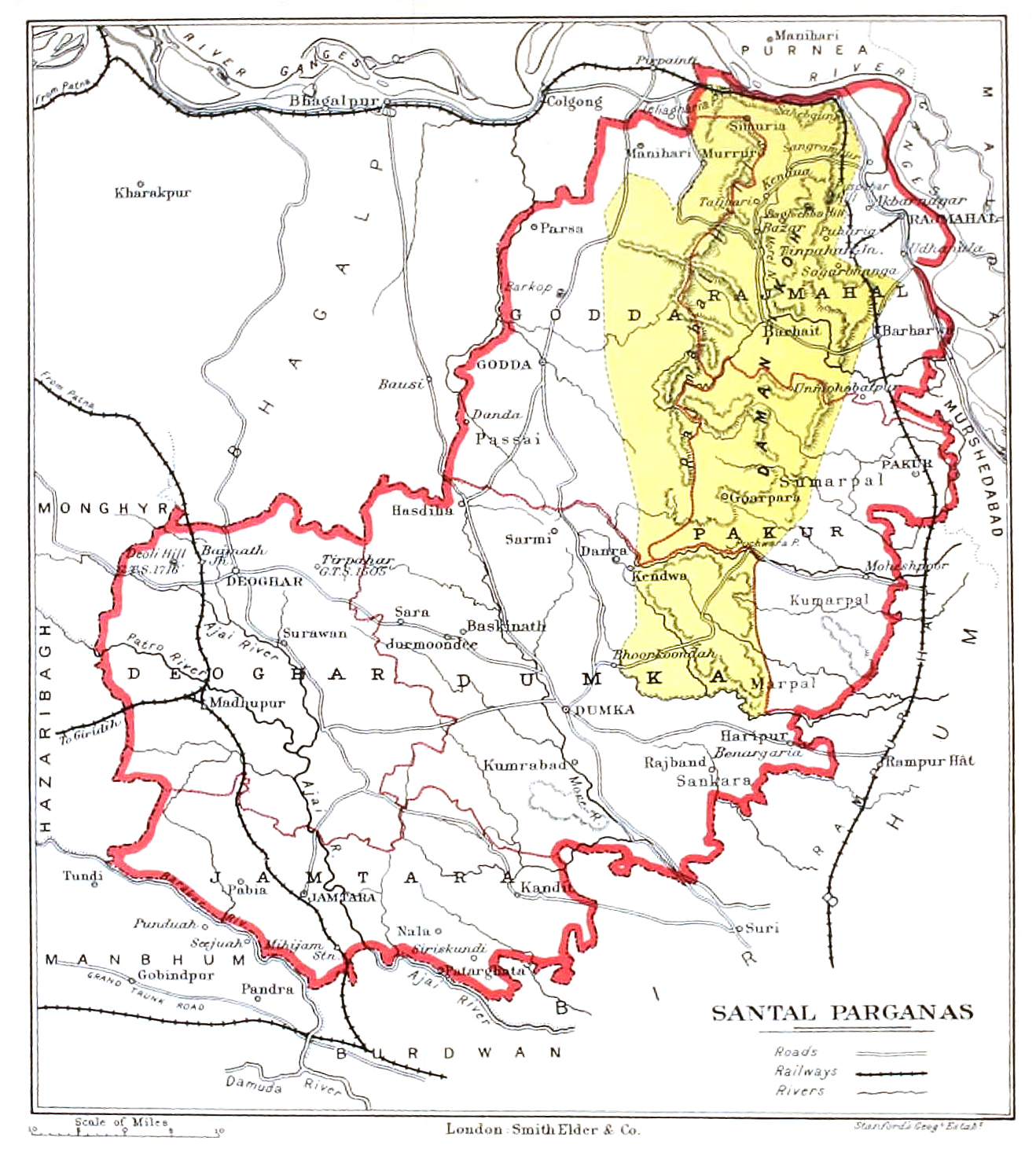
Boundary map (1905)

== History ==
This region is mentioned as Kajangala in different ancient literatures specially in Buddhist literatures. It is mentioned that the Chinese monk-traveller Xuanzang (Hiuen Tsang) travelled from Champa (recent Bhagalpur) to Kajangala and then proceeded to Pundravardhana (recent Bangladesh) in the 7th century AD. He says that the northern limit of its territory (means Sahebganj) was not very far from the Ganges. The forests to the south had plenty of elephants. The people were straight forward, talented and devoted to education.

In the system of Permanent Settlement, British encourage Mal Paharia of Rajmahal hills to practice settled agriculture but they refused to cut trees. Then British officials attracted attention to Santals who were ready to clear the forests for settled agriculture. In 1832, a large number of area demarcated as Damin-i-koh. Santal from Cuttack, Dhalbhum, Birbhum, Manbhum, Hazaribagh migrated, clear forest tracts and started cultivating these lands as peasants. British collected tax from Santals as revenue. The imposition of taxes, exploitation by Zamindar and money lenders sparked Santal rebellion. The Sidhu and Kanhu Murmu, two brothers organized and led Santal inhabitants for the Santal Revolt (Santal Hul) against the Britishers but were defeated. Their other siblings namely Chand Murmu, Bhairo Murmu, Phulo Murmu, Jhano Murmu also followed elder brothers leadership for fighting against injustice.

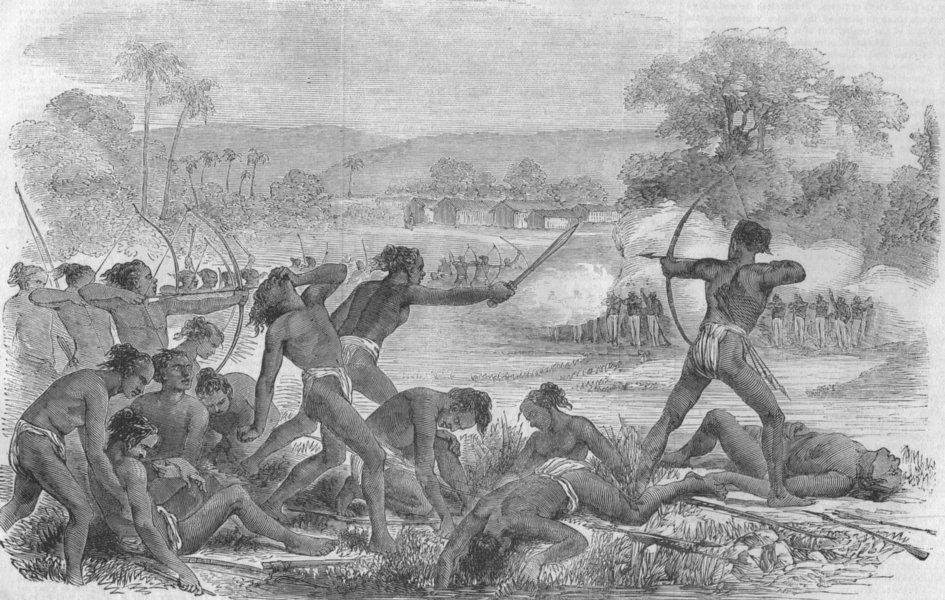
Attack by 600 Santhals upon a party of 50 sepoys, 40th regiment native infantry

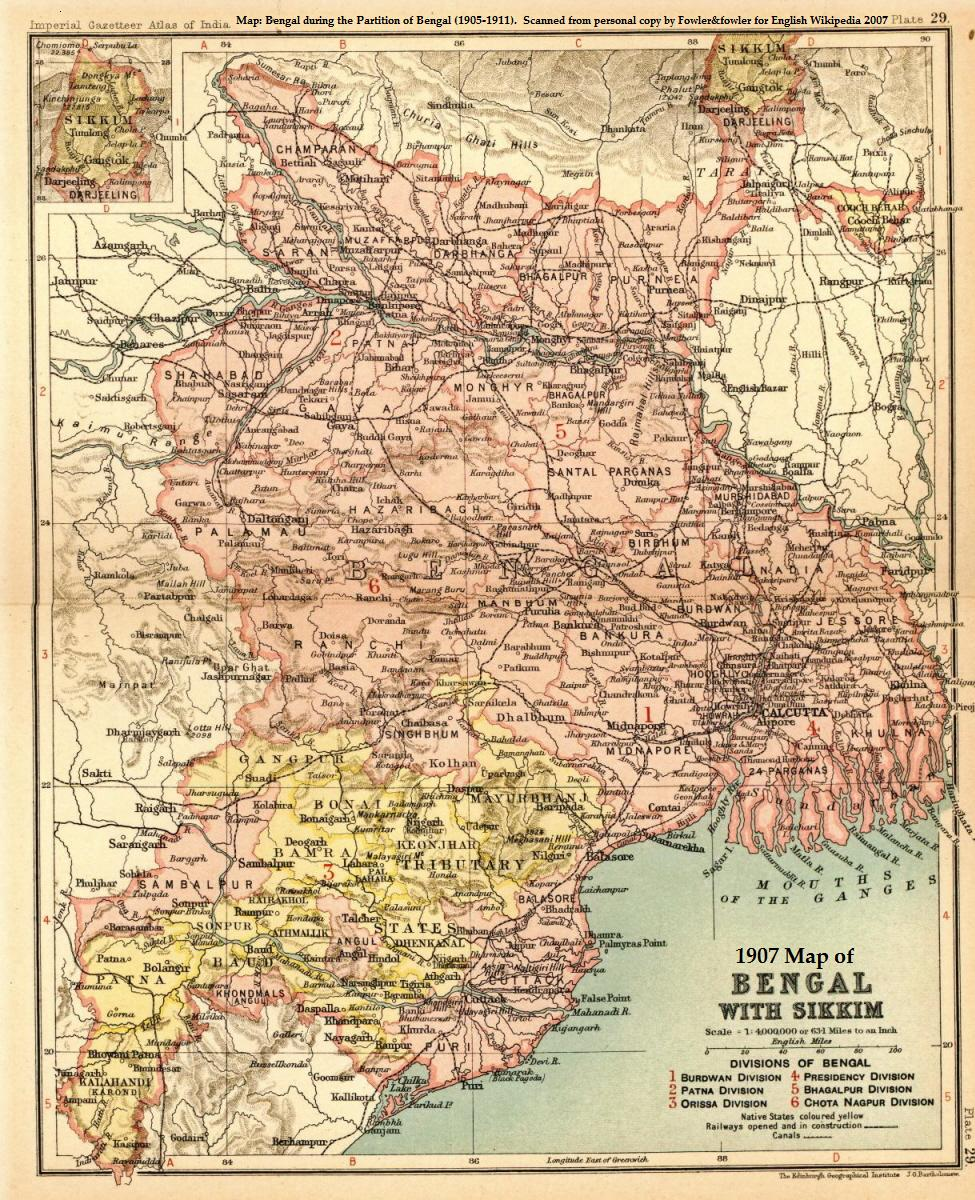
The Santal Parganas district in a 1907 map of the Bengal area

In 1855, during British India, Santal Parganas was created as a district, and was a part of the Bengal Presidency. Santal Parganas was a district, in undivided Bihar state, upgraded to a division in 1983. As a consequence of Santal uprising, the British passed the Santhal Parganas Tenancy Act ,1876 which offered some protection for the tribals against exploitation. It prohibits the sale of Adivasi land to non-Adivasis in the Santal Pargana region along present day Jharkhand's border with West Bengal. After Independence of India, the Santal Pargana Tenancy Act, 1949 is the first codified law of tenancy in Santal Pargana division of Jharkhand. When enacted, it supplemented existing British-era tenancy laws and codified some of the customary laws related to tribal land.

== Demographics ==
=== Languages ===
Languages in Santhal Parganas division (2011)
1. Khortha (29.1%)
2. Santali (24.2%)
3. Bengali (16.1%)
4. Angika (10.4%)
5. Hindi (8.69%)
6. Urdu (5.06%)
7. Malto (2.15%)
8. Bhojpuri (1.99%)
9. Others (2.24%)

It has a population of 6,969,097. Santali, Bengali and Hindi are mostly spoken national languages, followed by regional dialect Khorta.

=== Religion ===
Religions in Santhal Parganas 2011 census
1. Hindus (68.0%)
2. Muslims (22.7%)
3. Christians (4.21%)
4. Sarna and Sari Dharam (4.84%)
5. Others (0.27%)

The majority of the population follows Hinduism. Sari Dharam is followed by the Santal tribe residents and Sarna by other tribes.
