= Kajangala =

Ancient Territory

Coordinates: 25°02′56″N 87°50′17″E

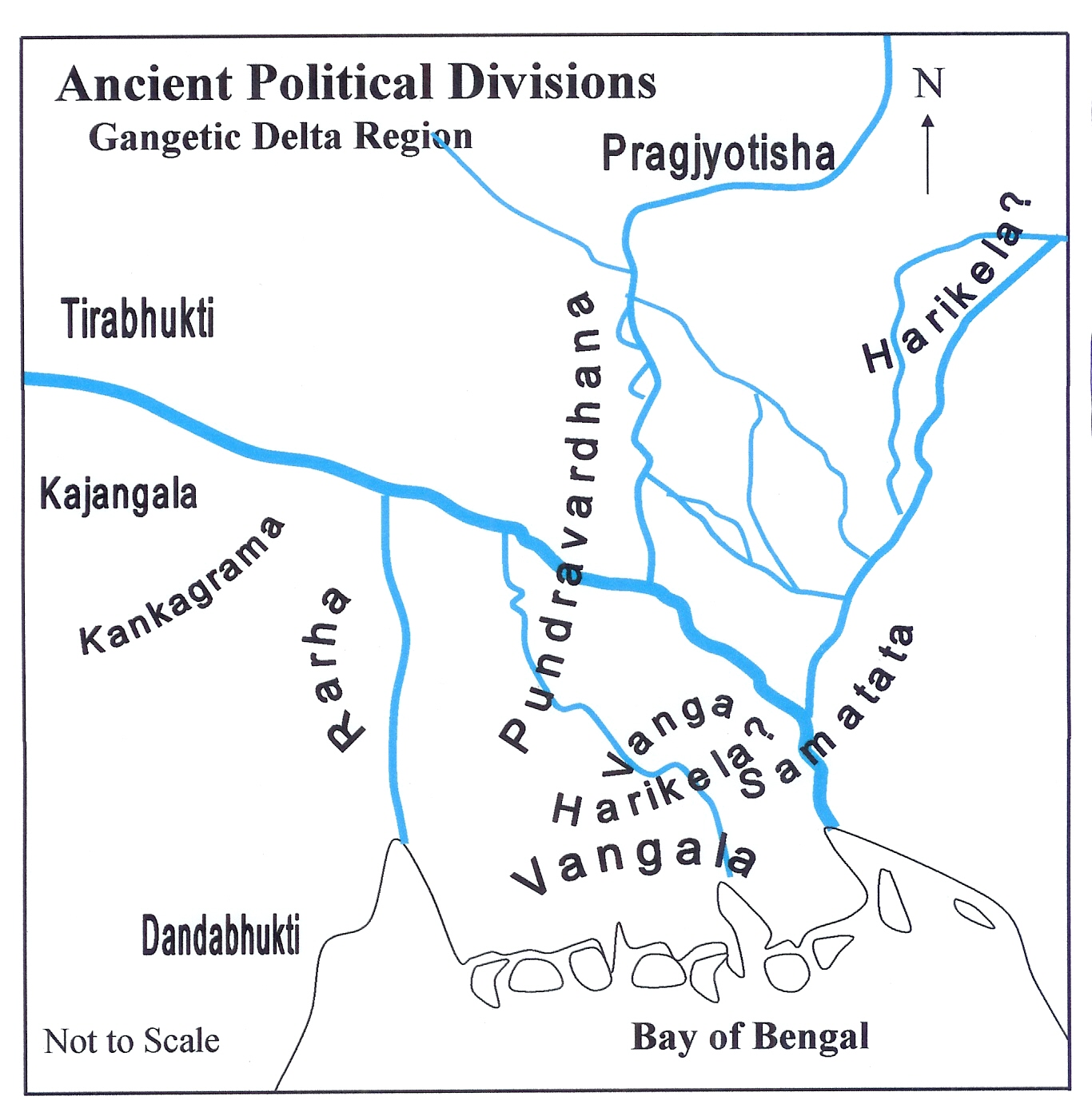

Kajangala (Bengali: কজঙ্গল), refers to a territory located near Rajmahal in ancient times, in eastern part of India.

== Extent ==
It was spread across what is now part of Birbhum district in West Bengal and Santhal Parganas in Jharkhand.

== History ==
The Pali Vinayaka-pitaka fixed the eastern limit of Aryavarta (land of the Aryans) at Kajangala.
