= Sidhu and Kanhu Murmu =

Leaders of Santhal rebellion (1855–1856)

Sido Murmu and Kanhu Murmu
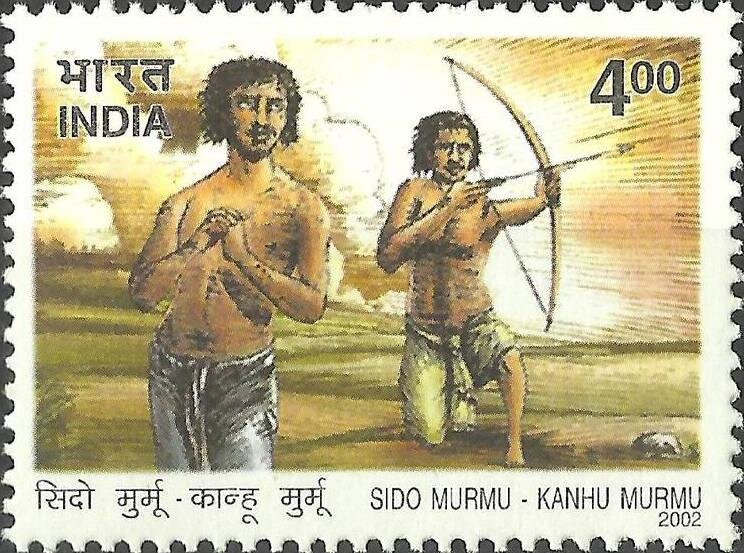
- Sido Murmu (left) and Kanhu Murmu (right)
- Born: c. 1815 (Sido), c. 1820 (Kanhu); Bhognadih, Sahebganj, (present-day Jharkhand, India)
- Died: 1856 (both); Bengal Presidency (present-day Jharkhand, India)
- Occupations: Freedom fighters; tribal leaders
- Known for: Leading the Santhal rebellion (1855–1856)
- Relatives: Chand Murmu and Bhairav Murmu (brothers)

Sido Murmu and Kanhu Murmu were Indian freedom fighters and brothers who led the Santhal Rebellion (1855–1856), an uprising that took place in present-day Jharkhand and parts of Bengal, including Purulia, Birbhum, and Bankura, in eastern India. The rebellion was aimed at resisting British colonial rule and the exploitative zamindari system.

== Rebellion ==
Santals lived in and depended on forests. In 1832, the British demarcated the Damin-i-koh region in present-day Jharkhand and invited Santhals to settle in the region. Due to promises of land and economic amenities a large numbers of Santhals came to settle from Cuttack, Dhalbhum, Manbhum, Hazaribagh, Midnapore etc. Soon, mahajans and zamindars as tax-collecting intermediaries deployed by British dominated the economy. Many Santals became victims of corrupt money lending practices. They were lent money at exorbitant rates when they never could repay then their lands were forcibly taken, they were forced into bonded labour. This sparked the Santal rebellion.

On 30 June 1855, two Santal rebel leaders, Sido Murmu and Kanhu Murmu (related as brother) along with Chand and Bairab, mobilized about 10,000 Santals and declared a rebellion against British colonists. The Santals initially gained some success but soon the British found out a new way to tackle these rebels. Instead, they forced them to come out of the forest. In a conclusive battle which followed, the British, equipped with modern firearms and war elephants, stationed themselves at the foot of the hill. When the battle began, the British officer ordered his troops to fire without loading bullets. The Santals, who did not suspect this trap set by the British war strategy, charged with full potential. This step proved to be disastrous for them. As soon as they neared the foot of the hill, the British army attacked with full power and this time they were using bullets. Although the revolution was suppressed, it marked a great change in the colonial rule and policy. The day is still celebrated among the Santal community.

== Legacy ==
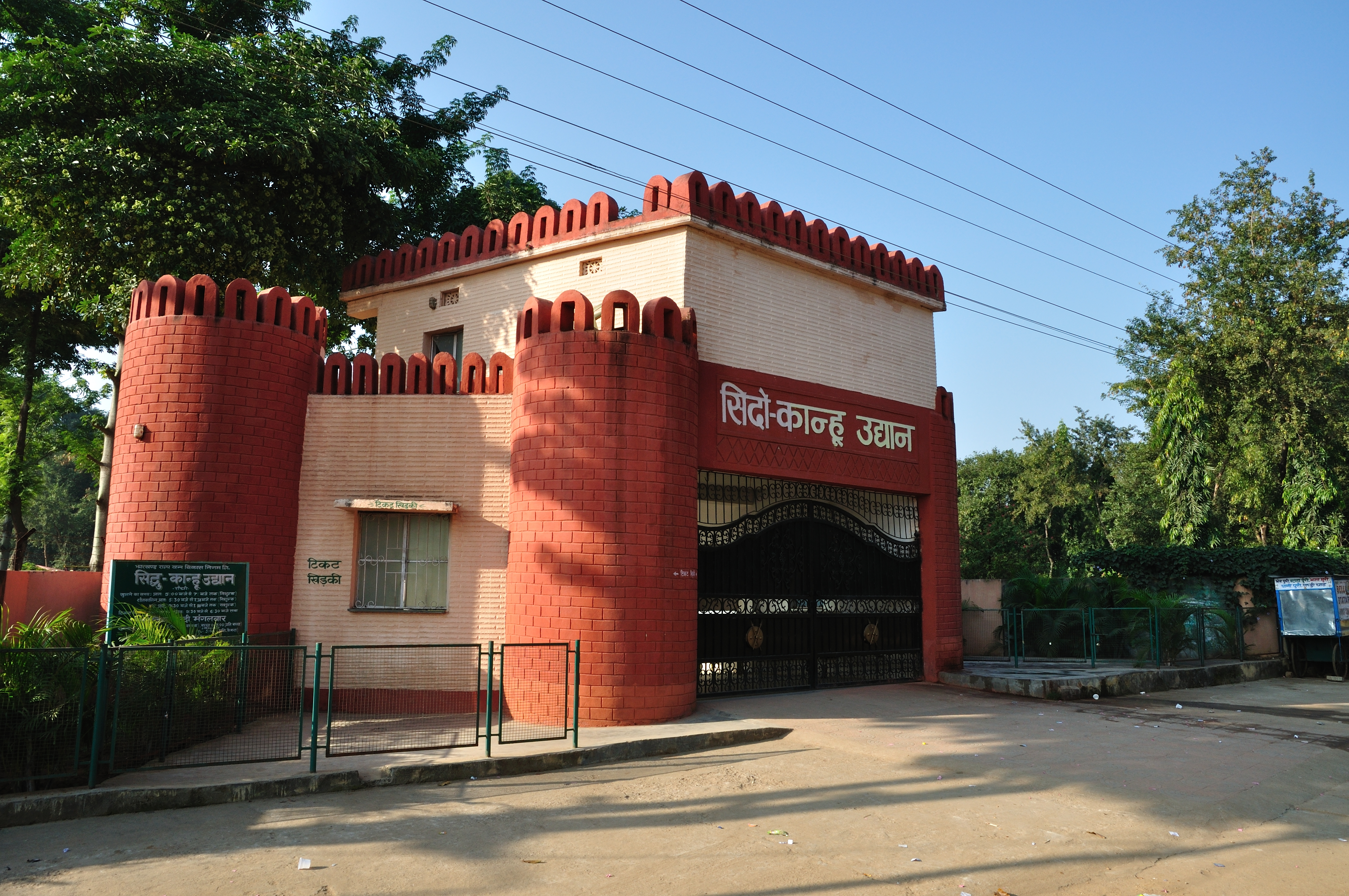
Sido Kanhu Memorial Park in Ranchi

Sido Kanhu Murmu University is named upon them. Indian post also issued a ₹ 4 stamp in 2002 honouring them. There is also a Sido Kanhu Memorial Park in Ranchi, named in their honour. The Sido-Kanho Dahar at Esplanade in Central Kolkata is named after them.

Indian Institute of Management Ranchi honored the heroes in 2024 by renaming two buildings in its central academic & administrative area as Sidhu Block & Kanhu Block. These blocks, now integral to IIM Ranchi’s landscape, embody not only architectural significance but serve as perpetual reminders of the enduring spirit of India’s freedom fighters.

== See also ==
- Santhal rebellion
- Tilka Manjhi
- Birsa Munda
