= Bhognadih =

- Village
- Location in Jharkhand, India Bhognadih (India)
- Coordinates: 24.8741319°N 87.592535°E
- Country: India
- State: Jharkhand
- District: Sahibganj
- Time zone: UTC5:30 (IST)
- PIN: 816102
- Vehicle registration: JH
- Lok Sabha constituency: Rajmahal
- Vidhan Sabha constituency: Barhait
- Website: sahibganj.nic.in

Bhognadih is a village in the Barhait CD block in the Sahibganj subdivision of the Sahibganj district of the Jharkhand State, India. Bhognadih was the main centre of the Santal rebellion.

== History ==
The Santals settled in large numbers in the region called Damin-i-koh in the late 18th century to early 19th century and they came from Odisha, Chotanagapur and West Bengal. The industrious Santals cleared the forests and brought large tracts of land under cultivation in the area between Bhagalpur and Birbhum. While the British collected the taxes, Bengali traders and money lenders poured in, other immigrants also came in. The Santhals were recklessly exploited. The Santal rebellion or Hul, as it was locally known, first raised it head in 1855 in the Damin-i-koh area, against the falsehood and negligence of the sahibs, extortion of Santals by the mahajans (money lenders), the corruption of the amla (officials) and oppression of the police. Their ire was particularly against the Bengali and other immigrants, collectively called Dikus. Over a period of time, the Dikus had acquired more and more of the land from the Santals.

The first attack of the Santals were against those who prospered at their cost. It was in the form of dacoities. The ring leaders were punished. The Santal community was exasperated and more of them poured in from other areas in their support. The leadership was provided by four brothers and two sisters – Sido, Kanhu, Chand, Bhairo, Phulo and Jhano – belonging to Bhognadih. The brothers claimed divine providence. On 30 June 1855, more than 10,000 Santals gathered at Bhognadih, proclaiming their aims. A sense of fear swept across the non-Santals, right up to Bhagalpur. A body of troops sent from Bhagalpur was defeated by the Santals and they were the masters and started ravaging the country from Colgong to Rajmahal, and as far south as Raniganj and Sainthia. With more troops having superior fire-power being rushed in, the Santals were pushed back to the forests and brutally suppressed. A large number of people along with all the leaders were killed.

Bhognadih, the village of the Santal brothers, is very sacred for the Santal community. There also is memorial for the brothers at Panchkatiya, where Sido and Kanhu were hanged till death.

Every year on the 30 June, a Shahid Mela is organised here, which has national level importance, to pay respect to the hul (rebellion) heroes.

== Hul Divas ==
To commemorate Santal Hul (rebellion), Hul Divas (Rebellion Day) is celebrated each year, specially among Santal tribes. It is now a custom that each year Chief Minister of Jharkhand state visit this place, and pay tribute to Sidho and Kanho, the eminent martyr for Santal's struggle for freedom from extortion in the British era.

== Future plan ==
The government of state is going to develop this village as historic site with modern facility.

== Geography ==
Cities, towns and locations in the Sahibganj, Godda and Pakur districts in Santhal Pargana Division
M: municipality, CT: census town, R: rural/ urban centre, H: historical/ religious/ tourist centre
Owing to space constraints in the small map, the actual locations in a larger map may vary slightly

=== Location ===
Bhognadih is located at 24.8741319°N 87.592535°E.

Bhognadih has an area of 240 hectares (590 acres).

=== Overview ===
The map shows a hilly area with the Rajmahal hills running from the bank of the Ganges in the extreme north to the south, beyond the area covered by the map into Dumka district. ‘Farakka’ is marked on the map and that is where Farakka Barrage is, just inside West Bengal. Rajmahal coalfield is shown in the map. The entire area is overwhelmingly rural with only small pockets of urbanisation.

== Demographics ==
According to the 2011 Census of India, Bhognadih had a total population of 1,662, of which 807 (49%) were males and 855 (51%) were females. Population in the age range 0–6 years was 388. The total number of literate persons in Bhognadih was 565 (44.35% of the population over 6 years).
