= Santal Parganas district =

Former district in Bihar, India

Sonthal Parganas district
- Former district of British and independent India
- 1855–1983
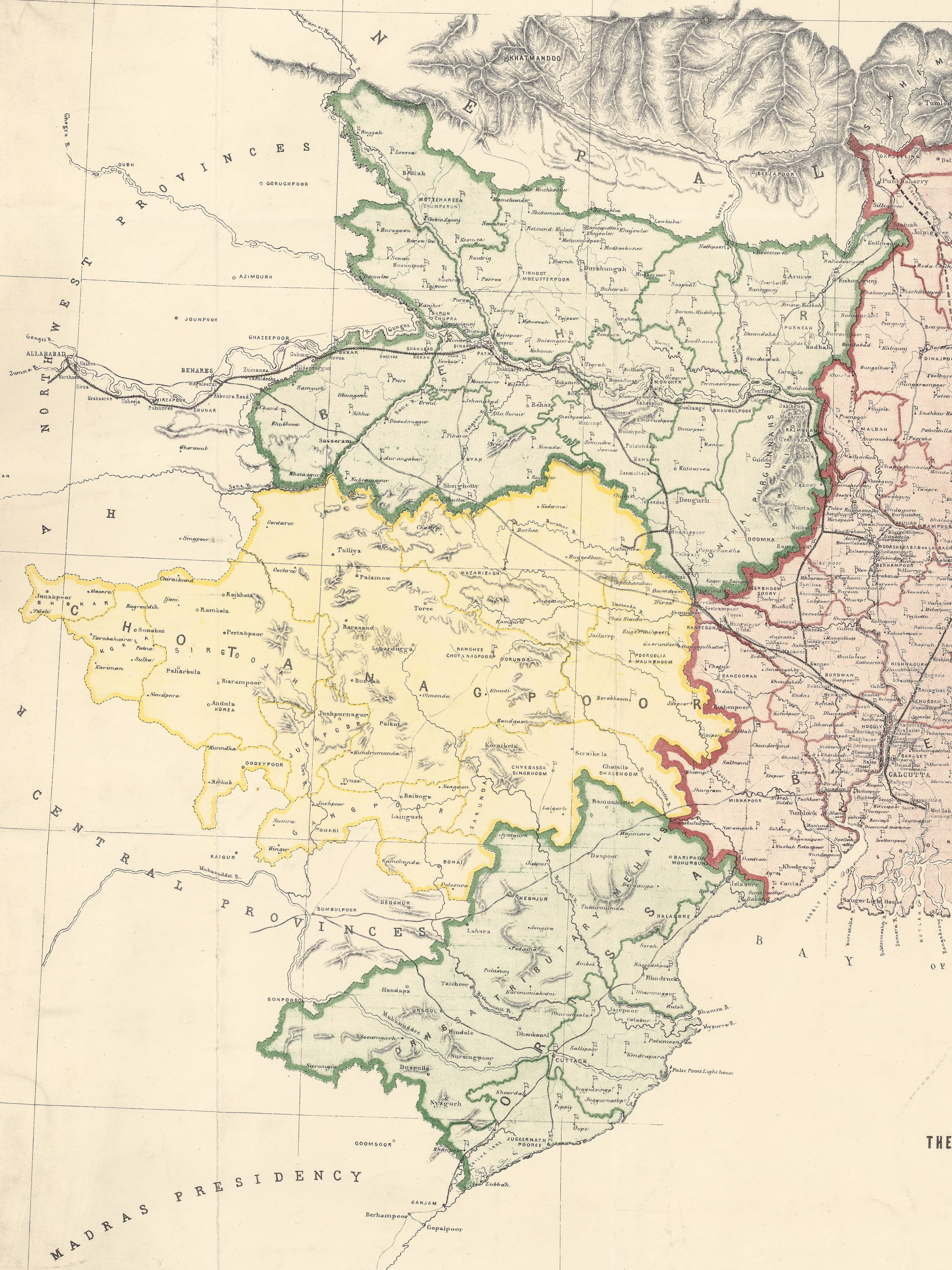
- Santal Parganas district, 1872
- Capital: Dumka
- Area
  - 1855: 14,167 km^{2} (5,470 sq mi)
  - 1872: 14,213 km^{2} (5,488 sq mi)
- Population
  - 1872: 1,259,287
  - 1901: 1,809,737
- Government
- Commissioner
  - 1855: George Yule
- History
  - Established: 1855
  - Bifurcation: 1983
Preceded by	Succeeded by
Birbhum district; Bhagalpur district	Santhal Pargana division

The Sonthal Parganas district, also known as Santal Parganas district, was created as a separate administrative division following the Santal uprising of 1855-56, which exposed the oppression faced by the Santals and prompted British reforms. The establishment of the district was formalized under the Sonthal Parganas Act, Act 37 of 1855.

== History ==
=== Background ===
The Santals originally inhabited the region from Hazaribagh to Medinipur, farming along the Subarnarekha River. Following the 1770 Bengal famine, the demand for agricultural land prompted their migration. In 1832, the British designated Damin-i-koh for settlement, initially offering it to the Paharia tribe, who refused. The Santals, migrating from Dhalbhum, Manbhum, Hazaribagh, and Midnapore, rapidly increased in population, from 3,000 in 1838 to 82,790 in 1851.

James Pontet was assigned in 1837 to manage Damin-i-koh for revenue generation, but tensions grew as the Santals resisted outsiders, including exploitative moneylenders and landlords. The construction of a railway further disrupted their livelihood. By the 1850s, resentment grew due to the oppressive revenue system and British-backed landlords.

In 1855, the Santal Rebellion erupted, with the rebels capturing Barhait and achieving an early victory at Pirpainti. British officials George Francis Brown and Major F. W. Burroughs responded by declaring martial law. Brown was later criticized for procedural errors, while Burroughs led the British forces. The British then appointed Alfred Clarke Bidwell to suppress the rebellion. Despite fierce resistance, the Santals were defeated, with thousands killed. Bidwell blamed Pontet for neglecting the settlers, and the rebellion exposed the exploitation of the Santals, leading to British reforms.

=== Established ===
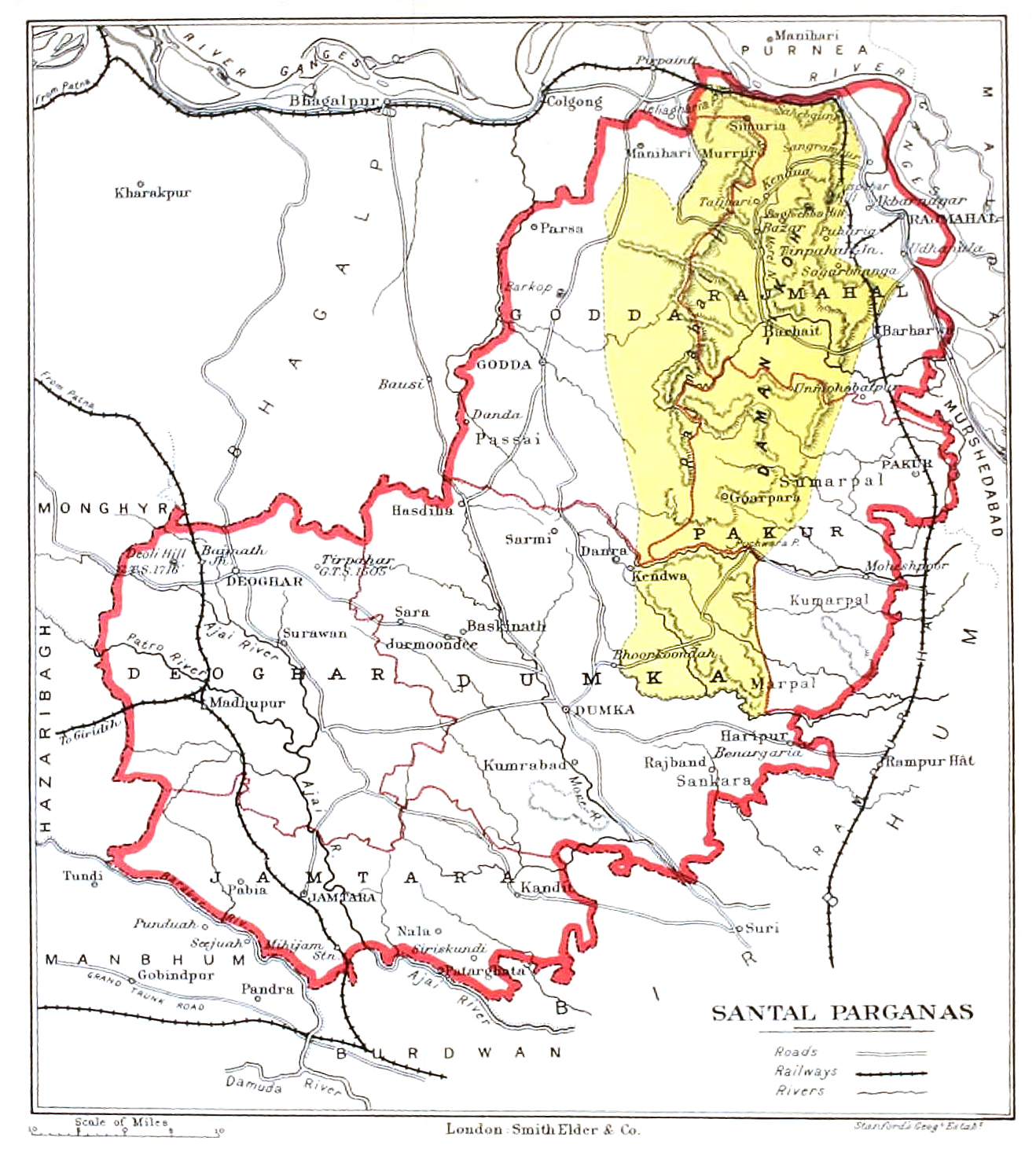
Map of Santhal Parganas district, 1901; Santhal Parganas district boundary Damin-i-koh area

The Sonthal Parganas Act, Act 37 of 1855, led to the creation of Santal Parganas as a non-regulation district under Bhagalpur’s jurisdiction. The region was administered by a Deputy Commissioner stationed in Dumka, who was assisted by other officials. This administrative structure was modeled after the South-West Frontier Agency of Chota Nagpur. Covering 5,470 square miles, it was bordered by Bhagalpur, Purnea, Malda, Murshidabad, Birbhum, Bardwan, Manbhum, Hazaribagh, and Monghyr. The district aimed to address Santal grievances while reinforcing British control.

Before the creation of Santal Parganas district, its northern half was part of Bhagalpur district, while the southern and western regions were under Birbhum district. The British referred to this region as Jungleterry (Jungle Terai) after assuming Diwani in 1765.

=== Bifurcation ===
The red-shaded area of current district map of Jharkhand, represents the former Santhal Pargana district from which other districts were carved out.

In 1983, after approximately 128 years, Santal Parganas district was reorganized into four separate districts under the Santhal Pargana division, with the subdivisions of Dumka, Deoghar, Sahibganj, and Godda officially designated as independent districts for administrative purposes. Further, in 2001, Pakur subdivision of Sahibganj district and Jamtara subdivision of Dumka district were carved out as separate districts.

== Administration ==
A separate Santal Parganas district was established in 1855, with George Yule appointed as the first administrator. Yule also held the position of Commissioner at Bhagalpur, with Ashley Eden serving as his deputy. Their administration was responsible for overseeing governance and implementing policies designed to manage the region's affairs in accordance with British colonial interests.

== Demographics ==
Historical population
Year	Pop.	±%
1872	1,882,973	—
1881	1,809,737	−3.9%
1891	1,753,775	−3.1%
1901	1,567,966	−10.6%
1911	1,259,185	−19.7%
1921	1,794,908	+42.5%
1931	2,050,258	+14.2%
1941	2,234,497	+9.0%
1951	2,322,092	+3.9%
1961	2,675,203	+15.2%
1971	3,186,908	+19.1%
1981	3,717,528	+16.6%
Notes: The actual population of the district varies slightly across different sources due to adjustments in area. Source: Census of India

=== Religion ===
Religion in Santhal Pargana district (1981)
Religion	Percent
Hinduism	78.64%
Islam	16.45%
Tribal belief	3.21%
Christianity	1.64%
Sikhism	0.02%
Jainism	0.04%
Other or not stated	0.01%

=== Language ===
Language of the district, 1981
1. Hindi (43.2%)
2. Santali (30.0%)
3. Bengali (14.6%)
4. Urdu (8.80%)
5. Malto (2.50%)
6. Other languages (0.90%)

=== Communities ===
According to the 1901 census, as the name implies, the Santhal Pargana district was overwhelmingly inhabited by Santhals, who constituted 36.6% of the total population. They were followed by Bhuiya (7.0%), Ahir and Goala (6.0%), Sheikh (4.3%), Jolha (3.5%), Malar (2.6%), Dom (2.5%), Rajput (2.4%), Teli and Kalu (2.4%), Brahmin (1.9%), Chamar and Muchi (1.9%), Kalwar and Sunri (1.8%), Musahar (1.6%), Kumhar (1.5%), Mal Paharia (1.4%), Kamar and Lohar (1.3%), Bauri (1.3%), weaving castes (i.e., Tanti) (1.2%), Chain (1.1%), Kahar and Behara (1.0%), and Hajjam and Napit (1.0%). Meanwhile, Kurmi, Dhanuk, Koiri, Halwa, Mayara, Kandu, Mahli, Dosadh, Rajwar, Hari, Mehtar, and others accounted for less than 15,000 people (i.e., 1% of the population). As of the 1981 census, Scheduled Castes and Scheduled Tribes comprised 45.19% of the district's population, with 8.39% belonging to Scheduled Castes and 36.8% to Scheduled Tribes.

== Gallery ==
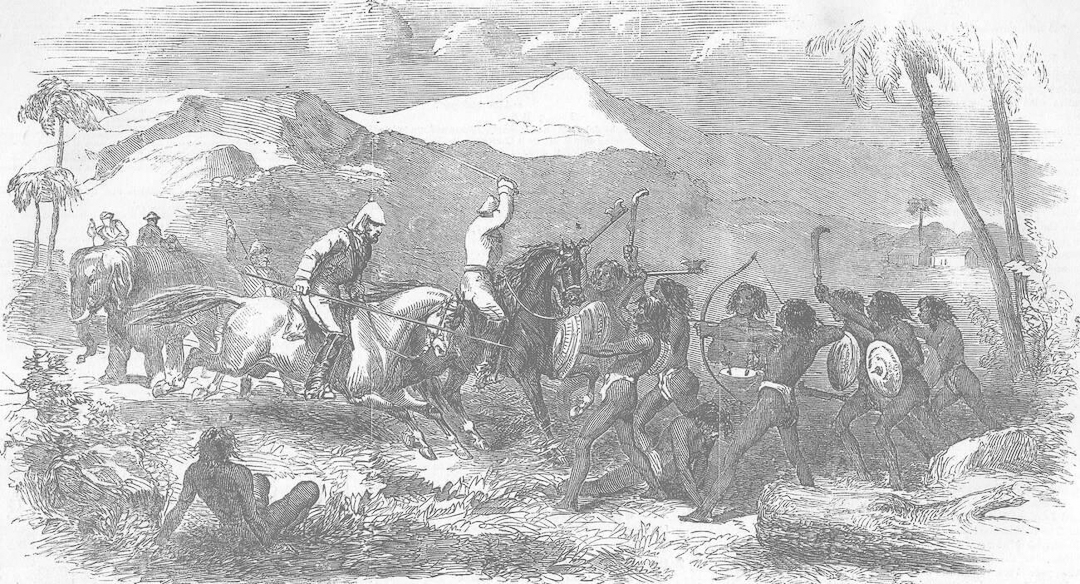
A residual skirmish between British railway engineers and Santal people

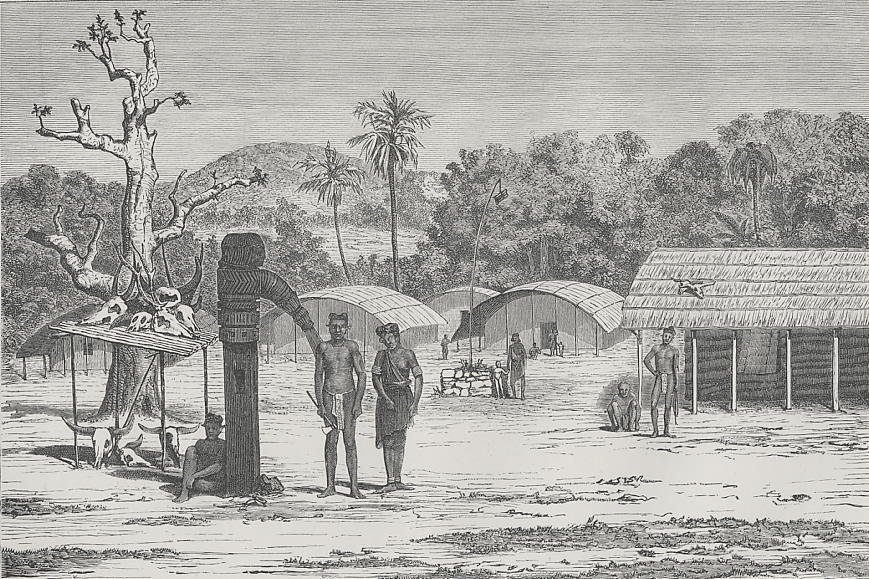
A Santhal hamlet in the Rajmahal Hills, illustrating houses, elephant deities, and sacrificial head trophies, Louis Rousselet (c. 1864 – c. 1868 observation; pub. 1875).

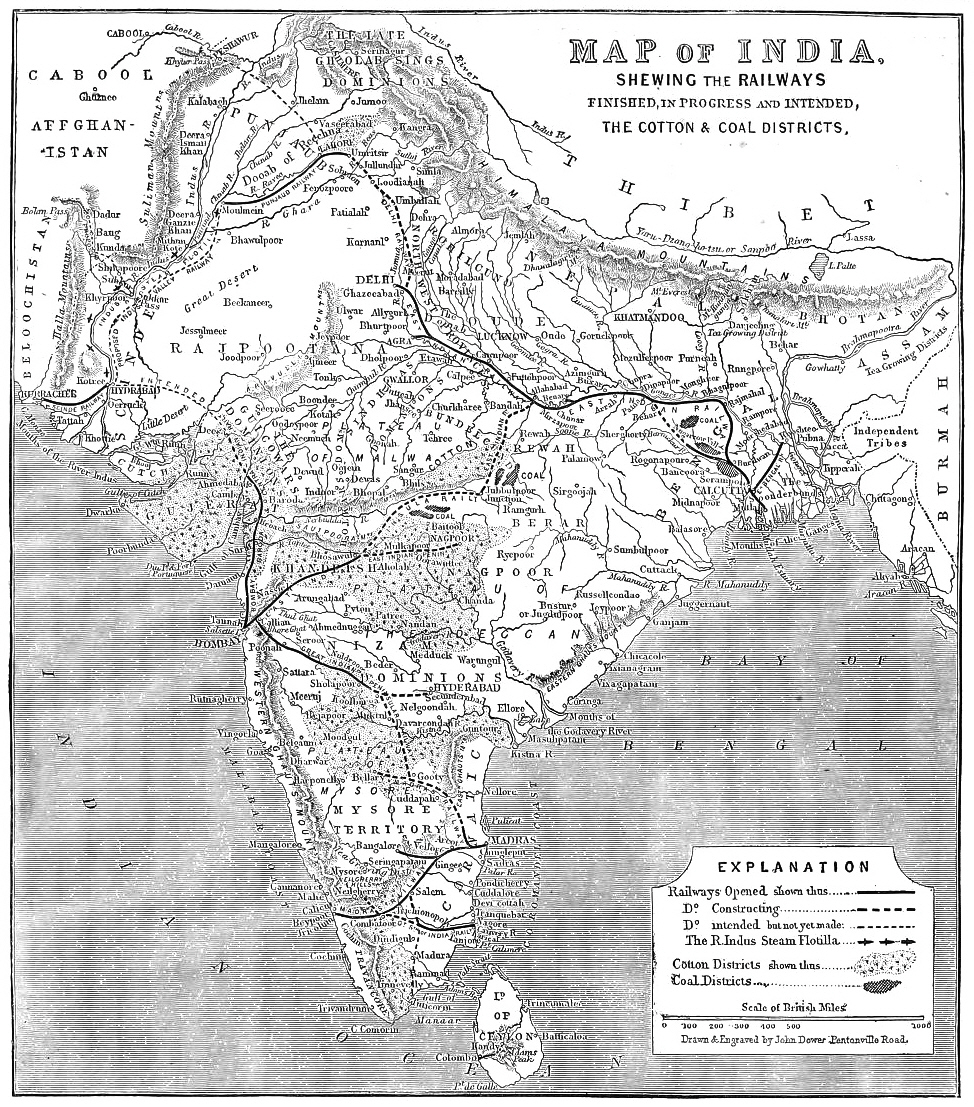
Railway passing through the Santhal Parganas, 1856.

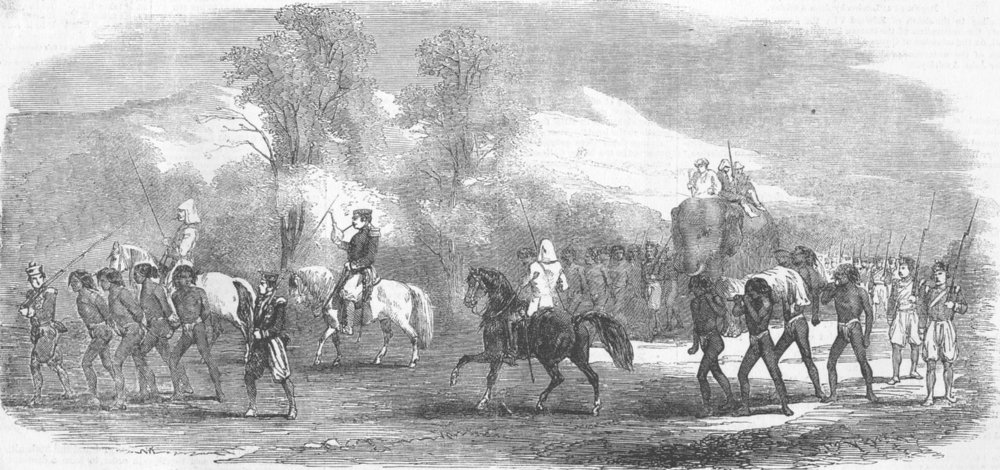
British forces escorting captured Santhals to prison.
