= Shaikhpara =

- Town
- Location in West Bengal, India Shaikhpara (India)
- Coordinates: 24.26505°N 88.551362°E
- Country: India
- State: West Bengal
- District: Murshidabad

Languages
  - Official: Bengali, English
- Time zone: UTC+5:30 (IST)
- PIN: 742308
- Lok Sabha constituency: Murshidabad
- Vidhan Sabha constituency: Raninagar
- Website: murshidabad.gov.in

Shaikhpara is a town, with a college, not identified in 2011 census as a separate place, in the Raninagar II CD block in the Domkol subdivision of Murshidabad district in the state of West Bengal, India. It is possibly part of Babaltali village in the census records. Babaltali is a big village with a population of 20,177 in 2011.

== Geography ==
Cities, towns and locations in the Lalbag and Domkal subdivisions, Murshidabad district
M: municipal town, CT: census town, R: rural/ urban centre, H: historical place
Owing to space constraints in the small map, the actual locations in a larger map may vary slightly

=== Location ===
Shaikhpara is located at 24.26505°N 88.551362°E.

=== Area overview ===
While the Lalbag subdivision is spread across both the natural physiographic regions of the district, Rarh and Bagri, the Domkal subdivision occupies the north-eastern corner of Bagri. In the map alongside, the Ganges/ Padma River flows along the northern portion. The border with Bangladesh can be seen in the north and the east. Murshidabad district shares with Bangladesh a porous international border which is notoriously crime prone (partly shown in this map). The Ganges has a tendency to change course frequently, causing severe erosion, mostly along the southern bank. The city of Murshidabad, a centre of major tourist attraction, is located in this area. In 1717, when Murshid Quli Khan became Subahdar, he made Murshidabad the capital of Subah Bangla (then Bengal, Bihar and Odisha). The entire area is overwhelmingly rural with over 90% of the population living in the rural areas.

Note: The map alongside presents some of the notable locations in the subdivisions. All places marked in the map are linked in the larger full screen map.

== Transport ==
Islampur-Shaikpara Road meets Shaikhpara Sagarpara Road at Shaikhpara.

== Education ==
- G.D.College, a self-financed general degree college, affiliated with the University of Kalyani, was established at Shaikhpara in 2007.
- Shaikhpara A.R.M. Polytechnic.
