= Narasinghapur =

Narasinghapur Narsingpur
- Village
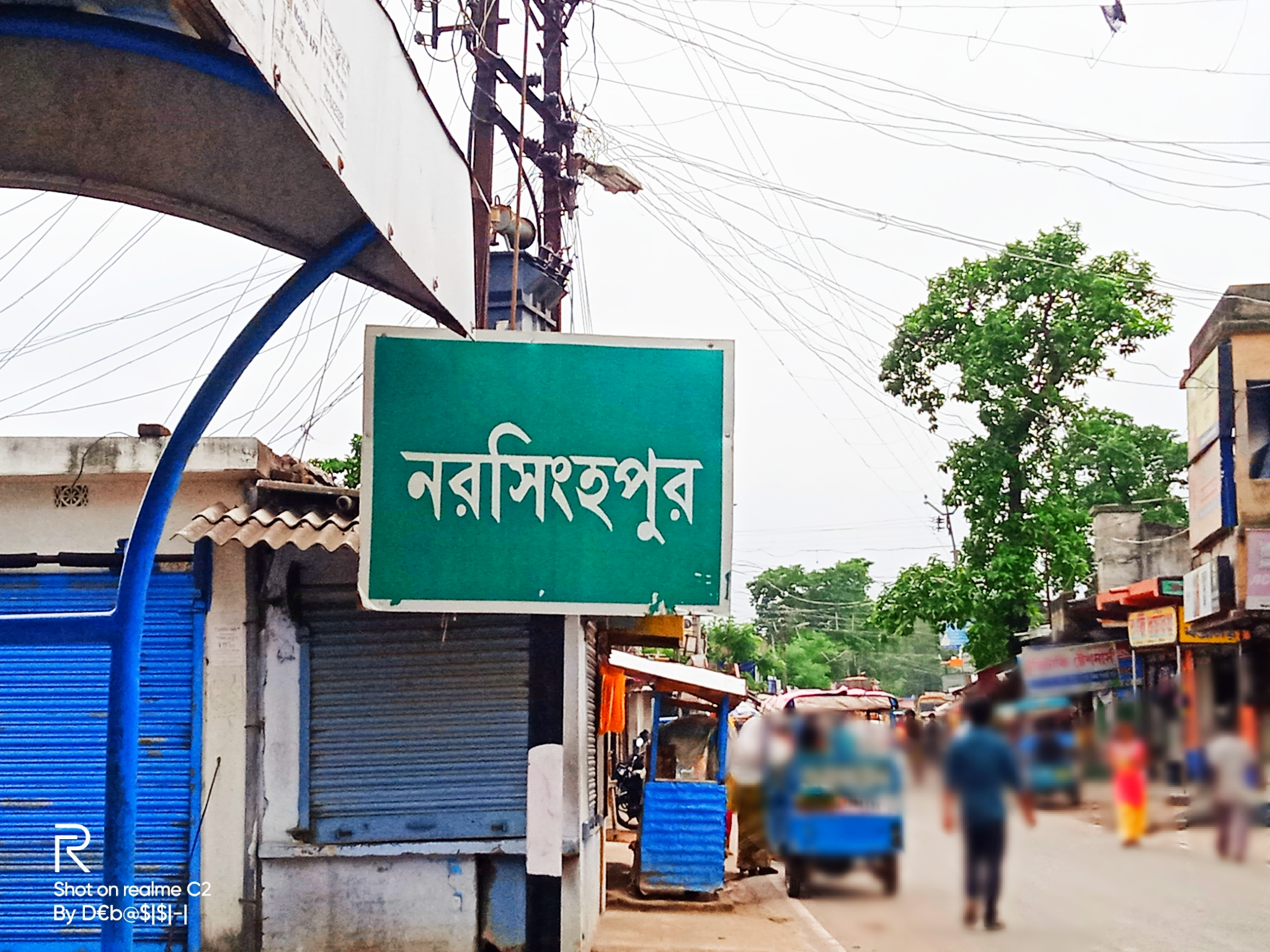
- Narasinghapur Bus Stand

- Location in West Bengal Location in India Location in Asia Location in Earth
- Coordinates: 24.2009204°N 88.6939674°E
- Country: India
- State: West Bengal
- District: Murshidabad
- Established: 1700
- Named for: Narasimha

Government
  - Type: State governments

Population
  - Total: 4,939

Languages
  - Official: Bengali, English
- Time zone: UTC+5:30 (IST)
- PIN: 742306
- Vehicle registration: WB 58
- Lok Sabha constituency: Murshidabad
- Vidhan Sabha constituency: Jalangi
- Website: Official Website

Narsinghpur or Narasinghapur is a village in CD block Jalangi in the Domkal subdivision of the Murshidabad district in the state of West Bengal, India. It was formerly under Jalangi Police Station but now it is under newly formed Sagarpara Police Station. The district headquarters is located at a distance of 65 km from Berhampore.

It has a population of around 5,000, engaged in trades, small scale industries, agricultural and .It lies at the geographic co-ordinates of latitude 24.2009204, longitude 88.6939674.

There is a many Temples and education Schools & Colleges situated near Narasinghapur. Narasinghapur is located under Jalangi police station in West Bengal. It is 2 kilometres from the Padma River.

== Location ==
Narasinghapur is located at 24.20°N 88.69°E.

== Education ==
=== Schools ===
- Narasinghapur Primary School.
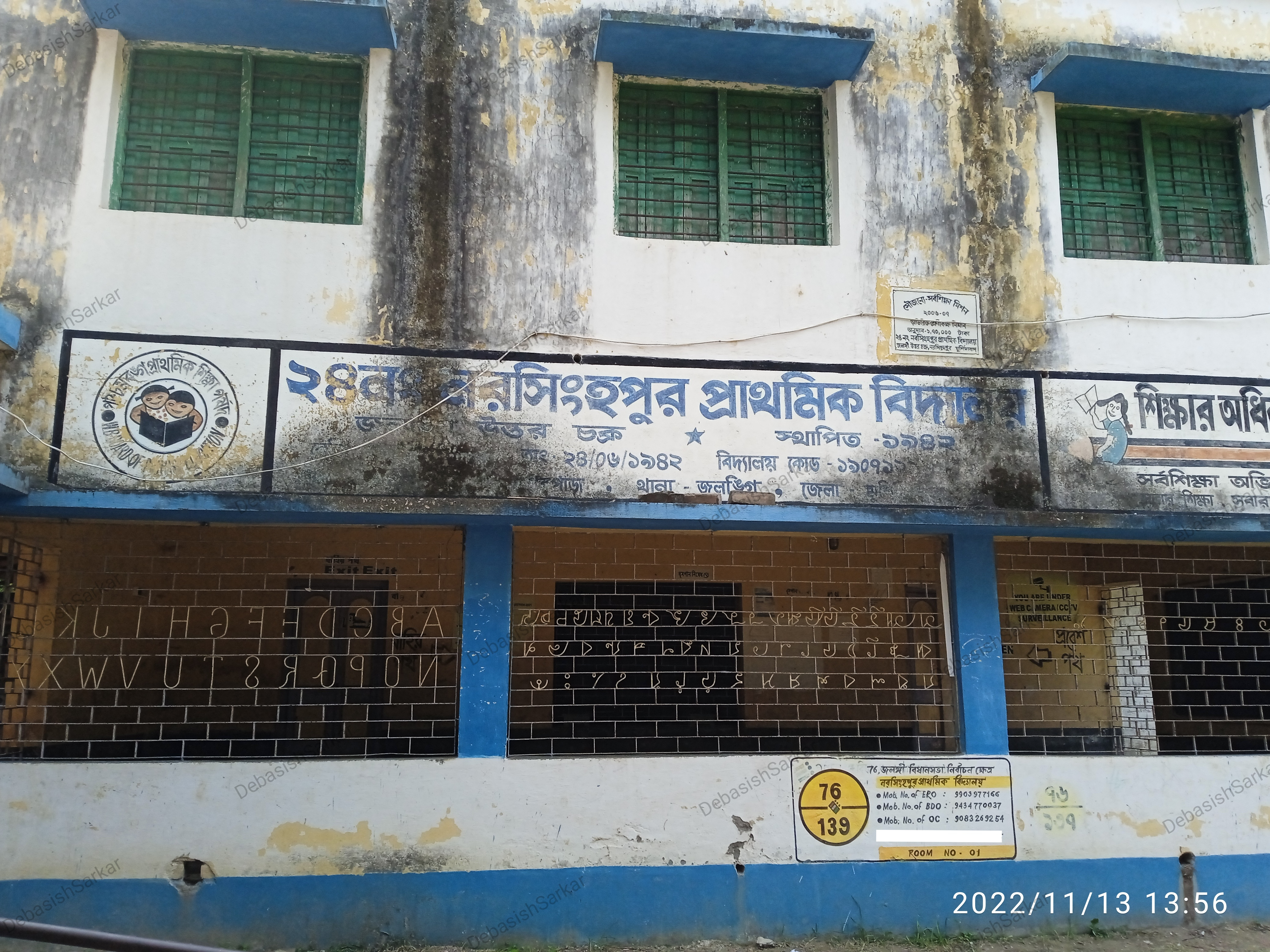
  Narasinghapur Primary School
- Bhagini Nibedita Shyamali
- Narasinghapur Haldarpara SSK

=== Colleges ===
- Narasinghapurur P.T.T.I. College.
- Nibedita Institute of Technology.
- Paradise Institute of Technology.
- Narasinghapur Primary Teacher Training College.
- Hemchandra B.Ed. & D.El.Ed.
- Discovery Institute of Polytechnic.
- Gitanjali B.Ed. College.
- Godagari P.T.T.I. College.

== Culture ==
=== Festival ===
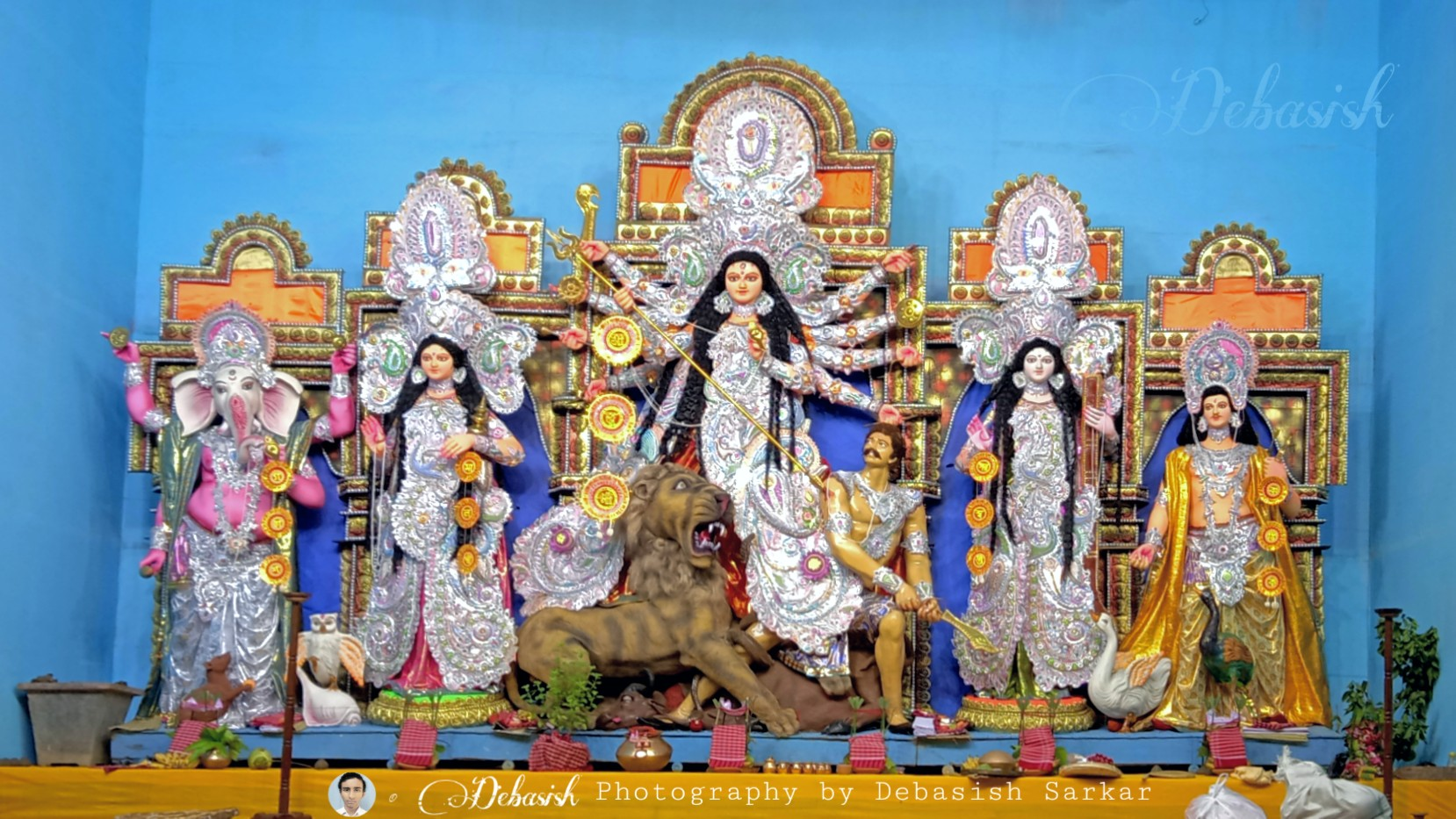
Narasinghapur Durga Puja

Namjagya, Durga Puja & Kali Puja is one of the Best festival in this area.

== Nature ==
Naturally beautiful place.
