= Jalangi (disambiguation) =

Jalangi may refer to:

- Jalangi, a village in West Bengal, India
- Jalangi (community development block), community development block in West Bengal, India
- Jalangi Mahavidyalaya, college in West Bengal, India
- Jalangi River, river in India
- Jalangi (Vidhan Sabha constituency), an assembly constituency in West Bengal, India
