= Domkal subdivision =

- Subdivision
- Interactive map of Domkal subdivision
- Coordinates: 24.12°N 88.55°E
- Country: India
- State: West Bengal
- District: Murshidabad
- Established: 14 December 1999
- Headquarters: Domkal

Area
  - Total: 837.88 km^{2} (323.51 sq mi)

Population
  - Total: 996,443
  - Density: 1,189.2/km^{2} (3,080.1/sq mi)

Languages
  - Official: Bengali, English
- Time zone: UTC+5:30 (IST)
- ISO 3166 code: IN-WB
- Vehicle registration: WB
- Website: wb.gov.in

Domkal subdivision is an administrative subdivision of Murshidabad district in the state of West Bengal, India. Domkal SDO is Subhankar Bala, IAS.

== Overview ==
The Bhagirathi River splits the Murshidabad district into two natural physiographic regions – Rarh on the west and Bagri on the east. Domkal subdivision lies in the Raninagar plain at the north-eastern corner of the Bagri region. The Raninagar plain lies between the Jalangi and Bhairab rivers. It is a low-lying area and is characterized by the nature of inundation along with many swamps. The Padma River separates Murshidabad district from Malda district and Chapai Nawabganj and Rajshahi districts of Bangladesh in the north.

== Geography ==
=== Subdivisions ===
Murshidabad district is divided into the following administrative subdivisions:

Subdivision	Headquarters	Area km^{2}	Population (2011)	Rural population % (2011)	Urban population % (2011)
Berhampore	Berhampore	1,195.57	1,725,525	80.15	19.85
Kandi	Kandi	1,200.76	1,155,645	93.21	6.79
Jangipur	Jangipur	1,097.82	1,972,308	56.43	43.57
Lalbag	Murshidabad	1019.10	1,253,886	92.36	7.64
Domkal	Domkal	837.88	996,443	97.55	2.45
Murshidabad district		5,324.00	7,103,807	80.28	19.72

Cities, towns and locations in the Lalbag and Domkal subdivisions, Murshidabad district
M: municipal town, CT: census town, R: rural/ urban centre, H: historical place
Owing to space constraints in the small map, the actual locations in a larger map may vary slightly

=== Administrative units ===
Domkal subdivision has 4 police stations, 1 municipality (Domkal), 4 community development blocks, 4 panchayat samitis, 38 gram panchayats, 240 mouzas, 203 inhabited villages and 2 census towns. The census towns are: Islampur and Harharia Chak. The subdivision has its headquarters at Domkal.

=== Police stations ===
Police stations in Domkal subdivision have the following features and jurisdiction:

Police station	Area covered km^{2}	India-Bangladesh border km	Municipal town	CD Block
Domkal	n/a	–	–	Domkal
Jalangi	n/a	n/a	–	Jalangi
Islampur	n/a	–	–	Raninagar I
Raninagar	n/a	n/a	–	Raninagar II

Murshidabad district has a 125.35 km long international border with Bangladesh of which 42.35 km is on land and the remaining is riverine.

There are reports of Bangladeshi infiltrators entering Murshidabad district. An estimate in 2000 placed the total number of illegal Bangladeshi immigrants in India at 15 million, with around 0.3 million entering every year. The thumb rule for such illegal immigrants is that for each illegal person caught four get through. While many immigrants have settled in the border areas, some have moved on, even to far way places such as Mumbai and Delhi. The border is guarded by the Border Security Force. During the UPA government, Sriprakash Jaiswal, Union Minister of State for Home Affairs, had made a statement in Parliament on 14 July 2004, that there were 12 million illegal Bangladeshi infiltrators living in India, and West Bengal topped the list with 5.7 million Bangladeshis. More recently, Kiren Rijiju, Minister of State for Home Affairs in the NDA government has put the figure at around 20 million. Critics point out that the Bengali politicians, particularly those from the ruling Trinamool Congress and the CPI (M), believe that a soft approach to the problem help them to win Muslim votes.

=== Blocks ===
Community development blocks in Domkal subdivision are:

CD Block	Headquarters	Area km^{2}	Population (2011)	SC %	ST %	Muslims %	Hindus %	Decadal Growth Rate 2001–2011%	Literacy rate %	Census Towns
Domkal	Domkal	305.19	363,976	2.61	0.33	89.69	10.16	16.78	63.90	–
Jalangi	Sahebrampur, Jalangi	210.63	252,477	12.61	1.16	73.27	26.57	17.11	67.35	–
Raninagar I	Kasbagoas	146.93	189,105	7.56	0.26	81.69	18.20	22.31	67.25	2
Raninagar II	Raninagar	175.13	190,885	11.62	0.29	80.78	19.03	22.34	63.60	–

=== Gram Panchayats ===
The subdivision contains 34 gram panchayats under 4 community development blocks 21 Ward comprising 23 mouzas under Domkal Municipality:

- Domkal CD Block – Garaimari, Sarangpur, Bhagirathpur, Garibpur, Juranpur, Dhulauri, Ghoramara, Madhurkul and Raipur.
- Raninagar–I CD Block – Herampur, Islampurchak, Paharpur, Hurshi, Lochanpur and Tenkaraipur Balumati.
- Raninagar–II CD Block – Kalinagar–I, Katlamari–II, Rajapur, Kalinagar–II, Malibari–I, Raninagar–I, Katlamari–I, Malibari–II and Raninagar–II.
- Jalangi – Choapara, Ghoshpara, Khayramari, Sahebnagar, Debipur, Jalangi, Sadikhanderah, Faridpur, Katabari and Sagarpara.

=== River bank erosion ===
As of 2013, an estimated 2.4 million people reside along the banks of the Ganges alone in Murshidabad district. The main channel of the Ganges has a bankline of 94 km along its right bank from downstream of Farakka Barrage to Jalangi. Severe erosion occurs all along this bank. The encroaching river wiped out 50 mouzas and engulfed about 10,000 hectares of fertile land. The following blocks have to face the brunt of erosion year after year: Farakka, Samserganj, Suti I, Suti II, Raghunathganj II, Lalgola, Bhagawangola I, Bhagawangola II, Raninagar I, Raninagar II and Jalangi. As per official estimate, till 1992–94 more than 10,000 hectares of chars (flood plain sediment island) have developed in main places, which have become inaccessible from the Indian side but can be reached easily from Bangladesh.

See also – River bank erosion along the Ganges in Malda and Murshidabad districts

== Economy ==
=== Infrastructure ===
All inhabited villages in Murshidabad district have power supply.

See the individual block pages for more information about the infrastructure available.

=== Agriculture ===
Murshidabad is a predominantly agricultural district. A majority of the population depends on agriculture for a living. The land is fertile. The eastern portion of the Bhagirathi, an alluvial tract, is very fertile for growing Aus paddy, jute and rabi crops. The Kalantar area in the south-eastern portion of the district, is a low-lying area with stiff dark clay and supports mainly the cultivation of Aman paddy. The west flank of the Bhagirathi is a lateritic tract intersected by numerous bils and old river beds. It supports the cultivation of Aman paddy, sugar cane and mulberry.

Given below is an overview of the agricultural production (all data in tonnes) for Domkal subdivision, other subdivisions and the Murshidabad district, with data for the year 2013–14.

CD Block/ Subdivision	Rice	Wheat	Jute	Pulses	Oil seeds	Potatoes	Sugarcane
Domkal	12,459	39,749	313,768	4,592	3,158	69,013	5,845
Jalangi	27,904	23,144	180,928	6,114	3,591	28,758	15,643
Raninagar I	24,675	26,581	119,818	2,819	13,908	4,285	3,535
Raninagar II	15,861	20,044	115,879	3,230	12,753	15,026	–
Domkal Subdivision	80,899	109,518	730,393	16,755	33,410	117,082	25,023
Barhampur subdivision	268,587	109,091	914,791	5,758	35,315	39,914	160,221
Kandi subdivision	487,207	4,157	6,186	4,818	9,355	85,886	106,646
Jangipur subdivision	207,472	45,261	207,425	9,374	12,375	38,197	52,344
Lalbag subdivision	68,034	20,304	427,450	7,809	22,592	40,997	3,295
Murshidabad district	1,112,199	288,331	2,286,245	44,514	113,047	322.076	347,529

== Education ==
Murshidabad district had a literacy rate of 66.59% (for population of 7 years and above) as per the census of India 2011. Barhampur subdivision had a literacy rate of 72.60%, Kandi subdivision 66.28%, Jangipur subdivision 60.95%, Lalbag subdivision 68.00% and Domkal subdivision 68.35%.

Given in the table below (data in numbers) is a comprehensive picture of the education scenario in Murshidabad district for the year 2013–14:

Subdivision	Primary School		Middle School		High School		Higher Secondary School		General College, Univ		Technical / Professional Instt		Non-formal Education	
Subdivision	Institution	Student	Institution	Student	Institution	Student	Institution	Student	Institution	Student	Institution	Student	Institution	Student
Barhampur	728	88,371	107	13,364	37	31,214	92	162,613	7	17,418	11	2,796	2,278	100,164
Kandi	672	66,030	105	11,248	46	32,752	61	87,482	5	7,830	3	400	1,717	74,370
Jangipur	747	144,416	72	14,159	25	30,004	76	194,025	5	15,335	5	500	2,793	160,236
Lalbag	601	72,429	74	8,997	24	22,174	66	120,454	5	13,088	7	759	2,082	93,891
Domkal	432	52,177	73	11,791	22	23,201	47	86,672	3	7,211	11	2,457	1,612	74,330
Murshidabad district	3,180	423,423	431	59,559	154	139,345	342	651,246	25	60,882	37	6,912	10,482	502,991

Note: Primary schools include junior basic schools; middle schools, high schools and higher secondary schools include madrasahs; technical schools include junior technical schools, junior government polytechnics, industrial technical institutes, industrial training centres, nursing training institutes etc.; technical and professional colleges include engineering colleges, medical colleges, para-medical institutes, management colleges, teachers training and nursing training colleges, law colleges, art colleges, music colleges etc. Special and non-formal education centres include sishu siksha kendras, madhyamik siksha kendras, centres of Rabindra mukta vidyalaya, recognised Sanskrit tols, institutions for the blind and other handicapped persons, Anganwadi centres, reformatory schools etc.

The following institutions are located in Domkal subdivision:

- Dumkal College was established in 1999 at Domkal.
- Domkal Girls' College was established in 2011 at Domkal.
- Jalangi Mahavidyalaya was established in 2010 at Jalangi.
- Murshidabad Adarsha Mahavidyalaya was established in 1981 at Islampur.
- G.D. College, a self-financed general degree college, was established at Shaikhpara in 2007.
- Shaikhpara A.R.M. Polytechnic at Shaikhpara offers diploma courses in food processing technology, computer software technology and medical lab technology.
- Murshidabad Minority BEd College at Sadikhanr Diar, affiliated to the University of Kalyani, offers a course in BEd

== Healthcare ==
The table below (all data in numbers) presents an overview of the medical facilities available and patients treated in the hospitals, health centres and sub-centres in 2014 in Murshidabad district.

Subdivision	Health & Family Welfare Deptt, WB				Other State Govt Deptts	Local bodies	Central Govt Deptts / PSUs	NGO / Private Nursing Homes	Total	Total Number of Beds	Total Number of Doctors*	Indoor Patients	Outdoor Patients
Subdivision	Hospitals	Rural Hospitals	Block Primary Health Centres	Primary Health Centres	Other State Govt Deptts	Local bodies	Central Govt Deptts / PSUs	NGO / Private Nursing Homes	Total	Total Number of Beds	Total Number of Doctors*	Indoor Patients	Outdoor Patients
Barhampur	2	2	4	15	3	–	–	45	71	1,645	282	149,393	2,094,027
Kandi	1	2	3	17	1	-	-	6	30	567	68	85,624	1,005,056
Jangipur	1	1	6	15	-	-	2	12	37	590	62	141,427	1,043,548
Lalbag	1	2	3	14	-	1	1	23	45	483	65	105,562	1,154,275
Domkal	1	2	2	9	-	-	-	19	33	252	44	45,110	802,309
Murshidabad district	6	9	18	70	4	1	3	105	216	2,537	521	527,116	6,099,215

.* Excluding nursing homes

Medical facilities in Domkal subdivision are as follows:
Hospitals: (Name, location, beds)
Domkal Subdivisional Hospital, Domkal, 68 beds

Rural Hospitals : (Name, block, location, beds)
Sadikhan's Dear Rural Hospital, Jalangi CD Block, Sadikhan's Dear, 30 beds
Islampur Rural Hospital, Raninagar I CD Block, Islampur, 30 beds
Raninagar (Godhanpara) Rural Hospital, Raninagar II CD Block, Raninagar, 15 beds

Block Primary Health Centres: (Name, block, location, beds)
Bhagirathpur BPHC, Domkal CD Block, Bhagirathpur, 10 beds

Primary Health Centres: (CD Block-wise)(CD Block, PHC location, beds)
Domkal CD Block: Garaimari (4), Jitpur (10)
Jalangi CD Block: Faridpur (4), Sagarpara (10)
Raninagar I CD Block: Hurshi, Maricha (6), Herampur (10)
Raninagar II CD Block: Bilpocha Kobra, Nabipur (6), Katlamari (10)

== Electoral constituencies ==
Lok Sabha (parliamentary) and Vidhan Sabha (state assembly) constituencies in Domkal subdivision were as follows:

Lok Sabha constituency	Reservation	Vidhan Sabha constituency	Reservation	CD Block and/or Gram panchayats and/or municipal areas
Murshidabad	None	Raninagar	None	Raninagar I CD Block, Kalinagar I, Kalinagar II, Malibari I, Malibari II and Raninagar I GPs of Raninagar II CD Block and Dhulauri GP of Domkal CD Block
		Domkal	None	Ajimganjgola, Bhagirathpur, Domkal, Garaimari, Garibpur, Ghoramara, Jitpur, Juginda, Juranpur, Madhurkul, Raipur and Sarangpur GPs of Domkal CD Block
		Jalangi	None	Jalangi CD Block, and Katlamari I, Katlamari II, Rajapur and Raninagar II GPs of Raninagar II CD Block
		Bhagabangola in Lalbag subdivision	None	Bhagawangola II community development block and Bhagawangola, Habaspur, Hanumantanagar, Kuthirampur, Mahammadpur, Mahisasthali and Sundarpur gram panchayats of Bhagawangola I CD Block
		Murshidabad in Lalbag subdivision	None	Murshidabad municipality, Jiaganj Azimganj municipality and Murshidabad-Jiaganj CD Block
		Hariharpara in Barhampur subdivision	None	Hariharpara CD Block and Chhaighari and Madanpur GPs of Berhampore CD Block
		One assembly segment in Tehatta subdivision of Nadia district		
