= Ramnagar Kachari Para =

Coordinates: 24.25°N 88.53°E

Ramnagar Kachari Para is a village in Murshidabad district in the Indian state of West Bengal.

== Village details ==
As of 27 September 2014

Address	Details
Village Name	Ramnagar Kachhari Para
Post Office	Ramnagar Doem Kanun
Block	Raninagar II
Police Station	Raninagar
District	Murshidabad
State	West Bengal
Country	India

== History ==
This village was established in 1916. The name came from Kacchari people who inhabited the area around the village.

== Transport ==
The village is served by several roads including a road to Raninagar and the Indian border.
