= Firoza Begam =

Indian politician

Firoza Begam (born 1969) is an Indian politician from West Bengal. She is a former two time member of the West Bengal Legislative Assembly from Raninagar Assembly constituency in Murshidabad district. She won seat in 2011 and 2016 West Bengal Legislative Assembly election representing the Indian National Congress.

== Early life and education ==
Begam is from Raninagar, Murshidabad district, West Bengal. She married Mohammed Aminul Islam. She completed her MA at University of North Bengal in 1992. She served as a headmistress of Pulinda Girls High School and her husband is also a headmaster of Nazirpur Esserpara High School.

== Career ==
Begam won from Raninagar Assembly constituency representing the Indian National Congress in the 2011 West Bengal Legislative Assembly election. She polled votes and defeated her nearest rival, Maksuda Begum of the All India Forward Bloc, by a margin of 1,089 votes. She retained the seat for the Indian National Congress winning the 2016 West Bengal Legislative Assembly election defeating Humayun Kabir of All India Trinamool Congress by a margin of 48,382 votes. She lost the next election to Abdul Soumik Hossain of the All India Trinamool Congress by a margin of 79,702 votes in the 2021 West Bengal Legislative Assembly election.
