= Jalangi (community development block) =

- Community development block
- Interactive map of Jalangi
- Coordinates: 24.13°N 88.71°E
- Country: India
- State: West Bengal
- District: Murshidabad

Government
  - Type: Federal democracy

Area
  - Total: 210 km^{2} (81 sq mi)

Population (2011)
  - Total: 252,477
  - Density: 1,200/km^{2} (3,100/sq mi)

Languages
  - Official: Bengali, English

Literacy
  - Literacy (2011): 58.73%
- Time zone: UTC+5:30 (IST)
- PIN: 742305 (Jalangi)
- Telephone/STD code: 03481
- ISO 3166 code: IN-WB
- Lok Sabha constituency: Mushidabad
- Vidhan Sabha constituency: Jalangi
- Website: Official Website

Jalangi is a community development block that forms an administrative division in the Domkol subdivision of Murshidabad district in the Indian state of West Bengal.

== Geography ==
Jalangi is located at 24°08′N 88°43′E

Jalangi CD block lies in the Raninagar plain at the north-eastern corner of the Bagri region in Murshidabad district. The Bhagirathi River splits the district into two natural physiographic regions – Rarh on the west and Bagri on the east. The Padma River separates Murshidabad district from Malda district and Chapai Nawabganj and Rajshahi districts of Bangladesh in the north. The Raninagar plain lies between the Jalangi and Bhairab rivers. It is a low-lying area and is characterized by the nature of inundation along with many swamps

Jalangi CD block is bounded by Charghat and Bagha upazilas in Rajshahi District of Bangladesh, across the Padma, and Daulatpur Upazila in Kushtia District of Bangladesh, in the north and in the east, Karimpur I CD block, in Nadia district, in the south and Raninagar I, Raninagar II and Domkal CD blocks in the west.

Murshidabad district has a 125.35 km long international border with Bangladesh of which 42.35 km is on land and the remaining is riverine. There are 9 blocks – Samserganj, Suti I, Suti II, Raghunathganj II, Lalgola, Bhagawangola I, Bhagawangola II, Raninagar II and Jalangi - along the Bangladesh-India border.

The Bagri or the eastern part of the district is a low lying alluvial plain with the shape of an isosceles triangle. The Ganges/Padma and the Bhagirathi form the two equal sides; the Jalangi forms the entire base; other offshoots of the Ganges meander within the area. It is liable to be flooded by the Bhagirathi and other rivers. The main rivers of this region are Bhairab, Jalangi, Chhoto Bhairab, Sialmari and Gobra Nala. All these rivers are distributaries of the main branch of the Ganges. The rivers are in their decaying stages.

A major problem is river bank erosion. As of 2013, an estimated 2.4 million people reside along the banks of the Ganges alone in Murshidabad district. Between 1931 and 1977, 26,769 hectares have been eroded and many villages have been fully submerged. 1980-1990 was a decade of erosion for this district and during the decade Giria, Sekhalipur, Khejustala, Mithipur, Fajilpur, Rajapur, Akheriganj, Parashpur villages were badly affected. Many families living along the Ganges continue to be affected. As for example, during the year 2006–07, 1,354 families are shifted as a result of river bank erosion and consequent flooding in Jalangi block and 3 mouzas were fully washed away.

See also - River bank erosion along the Ganges in Malda and Murshidabad districts

Jalangi CD block has an area of 210.63 km^{2}. It has 1 panchayat samity, 10 gram panchayats, 171 gram sansads (village councils), 53 mouzas and 39 inhabited villages. Jalangi police station serves this block. Headquarters of this CD block is at Sahebrampur, Jalangi.

Gram panchayats of Jalangi block/ panchayat samiti are: Choapara, Debipur, Faridpur, Ghoshpara, Jalangi, Katabari, Khairamari, Sadikhan's Dearh, Sagarpara and Sahebnaga.

== Demographics ==
=== Population ===
According to the 2011 Census of India, Jalangi CD block had a total population of 252,477, all of which were rural. There were 129,430 (51%) males and 123,047 (49%) females. The population in the age range 0–6 years numbered 32,313. Scheduled Castes numbered 31,831 (12.61%) and Scheduled Tribes numbered 2,918 (1.16%).

As per 2001 census, Jalangi block has a total population of 215,538, out of which 111,267 were males and 104,271 were females. Jalangi block registered a population growth of 24.55 per cent during the 1991-2001 decade. Decadal growth for the district was 23.70 per cent. Decadal growth in West Bengal was 17.84 per cent.

Decadal Population Growth Rate (%)

- Jalangi CD block
- Murshidabad district
- West Bengal

The decadal growth of population in Jalangi CD block in 2001-2011 was 17.11%.

The decadal growth rate of population in Murshidabad district was as follows: 33.5% in 1951–61, 28.6% in 1961–71, 25.5% in 1971–81, 28.2% in 1981–91, 23.8% in 1991-2001 and 21.1% in 2001–11. The decadal growth rate for West Bengal in 2001-11 was 13.93%.

The decadal growth rate of population in neighbouring Rajshahi District, across the Ganges, in Bangladesh, was 13.48% for the decade 2001–2011, down from 21.19% in the decade 1991–2001. The decadal growth rate of population in neighbouring Kushtia District in Bangladesh was 11.88% for the decade 2001–2011, down from 15.85% in the decade 1991-2001 and 21.52% in the decade 1981–1991.

There are reports of Bangladeshi infiltrators entering Murshidabad district.

=== Villages ===
Large villages in Jalangi CD block were (2011 population in brackets): Khayramari (18,943), Debipur (17,877), Natial (10,719), Dhanirampur (6,851), Kazipara (10,522), Sahebnagar (4,376), Sagarpara (27,385), Godagari (6,061), Ghanashyam Chak (6,814), Narasinghapur (4,939), Bara Bil Raghunathpur (11,314), Joykrishnapur (13,122), Muradpur Jalangi (10,890), Paschim Sahebrampur (25,005), Sadikhanr Diar (4,531), Bilaspur Nachharerpara (6,112), Faridpur (20,041) and Tikar Bariakalkihara (7,433).

=== Literacy ===
As per the 2011 census, the total number of literate persons in Jalangi CD block was 148,291 (67.35% of the population over 6 years) out of which males numbered 78,389 (69.36% of the male population over 6 years) and females numbered 69,902 (65.24% of the female population over 6 years). The gender disparity (the difference between female and male literacy rates) was 4.12%.

See also – List of West Bengal districts ranked by literacy rate

Literacy in CD blocks of
Murshidabad district
Jangipur subdivision
Farakka – 59.75%
Samserganj – 54.98%
Suti I – 58.40%
Suti II – 55.23%
Raghunathganj I – 64.49%
Raghunathganj II – 61.17%
Sagardighi – 65.27%
Lalbag subdivision
Murshidabad-Jiaganj – 69.14%
Bhagawangola I - 57.22%
Bhagawangola II – 53.48%
Lalgola– 64.32%
Nabagram – 70.83%
Sadar subdivision
Berhampore – 73.51%
Beldanga I – 70.06%
Beldanga II – 67.86%
Hariharpara – 69.20%
Naoda – 66.09%
Kandi subdivision
Kandi – 65.13%
Khargram – 63.56%
Burwan – 68.96%
Bharatpur I – 62.93%
Bharatpur II – 66.07%
Domkol subdivision
Domkal – 55.89%
Raninagar I – 57.81%
Raninagar II – 54.81%
Jalangi – 58.73%
Source: 2011 Census: CD Block Wise
Primary Census Abstract Data

=== Language and religion ===
Religion in Jalangi CD block (2011)
Islam	73.27%
Hinduism	26.57%
Other or not stated	0.16%

In the 2011 census, in Jalangi CD block, Muslims numbered 184,980 and formed 73.27% of the population, Hindus numbered 67,089 and formed 26.57% of the population. Others numbered 408 and formed 0.16% of the population. In Jalangi CD block while the proportion of Muslims increased from 68.15% in 1991 to 70.94% in 2001, the proportion of Hindus declined from 31.84% in 1991 to 28.90% in 2001.

Murshidabad district had 4,707,573 Muslims who formed 66.27% of the population, 2,359,061 Hindus who formed 33.21% of the population, and 37, 173 persons belonging to other religions who formed 0.52% of the population, in the 2011 census. While the proportion of Muslim population in the district increased from 61.40% in 1991 to 63.67% in 2001, the proportion of Hindu population declined from 38.39% in 1991 to 35.92% in 2001.

Murshidabad was the only Muslim majority district in West Bengal at the time of partition of India in 1947. The proportion of Muslims in the population of Murshidabad district in 1951 was 55.24%. The Radcliffe Line had placed Muslim majority Murshidabad in India and the Hindu majority Khulna in Pakistan, in order to maintain the integrity of the Ganges river system In India.

Bengali is the predominant language, spoken by 99.76% of the population.

== Rural poverty ==
As per the Human Development Report 2004 for West Bengal, the rural poverty ratio in Murshidabad district was 46.12%. Purulia, Bankura and Birbhum districts had higher rural poverty ratios. These estimates were based on Central Sample data of NSS 55th round 1999–2000.

== Economy ==
=== Livelihood ===
In Jalangi CD block in 2011, amongst the class of total workers, cultivators numbered 18,826 and formed 21.89%, agricultural labourers numbered 42,431 and formed 49.33%, household industry workers numbered 4,553 and formed 5.29% and other workers numbered 20,207 and formed 23.49%.

=== Infrastructure ===
There are 39 inhabited villages in Jalangi CD block. 100% villages have power supply and 37 villages (34.97%) had drinking water supply. 14 villages (35.90%) have post offices. 39 villages (100%) have telephones (including landlines, public call offices and mobile phones). 14 villages (35.90%) have a pucca approach road and 23 villages (58.97%) have transport communication (includes bus service, rail facility and navigable waterways). 4 villages (10.26%) have agricultural credit societies and 9 villages (23.08%) have banks.

=== Agriculture ===
Persons engaged in agriculture
in Jalangi CD block
1. Bargadars (5.99%)
2. Patta holders (15.6%)
3. Small farmers (4.55%)
4. Marginal farmers (18.9%)
5. Agricultural labourers (55.0%)

From 1977 onwards major land reforms took place in West Bengal. Land in excess of land ceiling was acquired and distributed amongst the peasants. Following land reforms land ownership pattern has undergone transformation. In 2013–14, persons engaged in agriculture in Jalangi CD block could be classified as follows: bargadars 4,621 (5.99%), patta (document) holders 12,030 (15.59%), small farmers (possessing land between 1 and 2 hectares) 3,508 (4.55%), marginal farmers (possessing land up to 1 hectare) 14,558 (18.87%) and agricultural labourers 42,431 (55.00%).

Jalangi CD block had 103 fertiliser depots, 3 seed stores and 44 fair price shops in 2013–14.

In 2013–14, Jalangi CD block produced 11,750 tonnes of Aman paddy, the main winter crop from 3,954 hectares, 14,219 tonnes of Boro paddy (spring crop) from 3,569 hectares, 1,935 toones of Aus paddy (summer crop) from 667 hectares, 23,144 tonnes of wheat from 7,834 hectares, 535 tonnes of maize from 207 hectares, 180,928 tonnes of jute from 12,308 hectares, 28,758 tonnes of potatoes from 1,246 hectares and 15,743 tonnes of sugar cane from 59 hectares. It also produced pulses and oilseeds.

In 2013–14, the total area irrigated in Jalangi CD block was 13,364 hectares, out of which 136 hectares were irrigated with river lift irrigation, 628 hectares by deep tube well and 12,600 hectares by other means.

=== Silk and handicrafts ===
Murshidabad is famous for its silk industry since the Middle Ages. There are three distinct categories in this industry, namely (i) Mulberry cultivation and silkworm rearing (ii) Peeling of raw silk (iii) Weaving of silk fabrics.

Ivory carving is an important cottage industry from the era of the Nawabs. The main areas where this industry has flourished are Khagra and Jiaganj. 99% of ivory craft production is exported. In more recent years sandalwood etching has become more popular than ivory carving. Bell metal and Brass utensils are manufactured in large quantities at Khagra, Berhampore, Kandi and Jangipur. Beedi making has flourished in the Jangipur subdivision.

=== Banking ===
In 2013–14, Jalangi CD block had offices of 7 commercial banks and 3 gramin banks.

=== Backward Regions Grant Fund ===
Murshidabad district is listed as a backward region and receives financial support from the Backward Regions Grant Fund. The fund, created by the Government of India, is designed to redress regional imbalances in development. As of 2012, 272 districts across the country were listed under this scheme. The list includes 11 districts of West Bengal.

== Transport ==
Jalangi CD block has 2 ferry services and 7 originating/ terminating bus routes. The nearest railway station is 53 km from the CD block headquarters.

State Highway 11, running from Mahammad Bazar (in Birbhum district) to Ranaghat (in Nadia district) passes through this CD block.

Jalangi is well connected with district sadar town Baharampur, Murshidabad and Kolkata via Krishnanagar. Frequent bus services are there.

== Education ==
In 2013–14, Jalangi CD block had 113 primary schools with 12,913 students, 25 middle schools with 4,733 students, 4 high schools with 4,790 students and 13 higher secondary schools with 22,169 students. Jalangi CD block had 1 general college with 1,236 students, four technical/ professional institutions with 379 students and 421 institutions for special and non-formal education with 22,168 students.

Jalangi Mahavidyalaya was established in 2010 at Jalangi. Subjects taught in the college are: Bengali, English, Hindi, history, physics and zoology.

Murshidabad Minority B Ed College at Sadikhanr Diar, affiliated to the University of Kalyani, offers a course in B Ed.

In Jalangi CD Block, amongst the 39 inhabited villages, 2 villages do not have a school, 28 villages have more than 1 primary school, 23 villages have at least 1 primary and 1 middle school and 15 villages had at least 1 middle and 1 secondary school.

== Healthcare ==
In 2014, Jalangi CD block had 1 block primary health centre and 2 primary health centres with total 44 beds and 3 doctors (excluding private bodies). It had 33 family welfare subcentres. 8,243 patients were treated indoor and 91,862 patients were treated outdoor in the hospitals, health centres and subcentres of the CD block.

Jalangi CD block has Sadikhanr Diara Rural Hospital at Sadikhanr Diar (with 30 beds), Faridpur Primary Health Centre (with 4 beds) and Sagarpara PHC (with 10 beds).

Jalangi CD block is one of the areas of Murshidabad district where ground water is affected by a high level of arsenic contamination. The WHO guideline for arsenic in drinking water is 10 mg/ litre, and the Indian Standard value is 50 mg/ litre. All but one of the 26 blocks of Murshidabad district have arsenic contamination above the WHO level, all but two of the blocks have arsenic concentration above the Indian Standard value and 17 blocks have arsenic concentration above 300 mg/litre. The maximum concentration in Jalangi CD block is 2,040 mg/litre.
