= Sadikhanr Diar =

Sadikhan's dearh Sadikhan’s Dearh
- Village
- Location in Jalangi, Murshidabad, West Bengal, India Sadikhan's dearh (India)
- Coordinates: 24.1328°N 88.6507°E
- Country: India
- State: West Bengal
- District: Murshidabad
- Founder: Dr. Shishir Kumar Mukherjee

Population (2011)
  - Total: 4,531

Languages
  - Official: Bengali, English
- Time zone: UTC+5:30 (IST)
- PIN: 742303
- Lok Sabha constituency: Murshidabad
- Vidhan Sabha constituency: Jalangi
- Website: murshidabad.gov.in

Sadikhan's dearh is a village in the Jalangi CD block in the Domkal subdivision of Murshidabad district in the state of West Bengal, India.

== Geography ==
Cities, towns and locations in the Lalbag and Domkal subdivisions, Murshidabad district
M: municipal town, CT: census town, R: rural/ urban centre, H: historical place
Owing to space constraints in the small map, the actual locations in a larger map may vary slightly

=== Location ===
Sadikhan's dearh is located at 24.1328°N 88.6507°E.

Villages at Sadikhan's Dearh gram panchayat are: Arazi Sadipur, Bara Bil Raghunathpur, Bilaspur Nachharerpara, Damas Bil, Harishankarpur, Paranpur, Paschim, Mehedipara, Sahebrampur, Raghunathpur, Sadikhar Diar and Sadipur.

=== Area overview ===
While the Lalbag subdivision is spread across both the natural physiographic regions of the district, Rarh and Bagri, the Domkal subdivision occupies the north-eastern corner of Bagri. In the map alongside, the Ganges/ Padma River flows along the northern portion. The border with Bangladesh can be seen in the north and the east. Murshidabad district shares with Bangladesh a porous international border which is notoriously crime prone (partly shown in this map).The Ganges has a tendency to change course frequently, causing severe erosion, mostly along the southern bank. The city of Murshidabad, a centre of major tourist attraction, is located in this area. In 1717, when Murshid Quli Khan became Subahdar, he made Murshidabad the capital of Subah Bangla (then Bengal, Bihar and Odisha). The entire area is overwhelmingly rural with over 90% of the population living in the rural areas.

Note: The map alongside presents some of the notable locations in the subdivisions. All places marked in the map are linked in the larger full screen map.

== Demographics ==
According to the 2011 Census of India, Sadikhan's Dearh had a total population of 4,531, of which 2,284 (50%) were males and 2,247 (50%) were females. Population in the age range 0–6 years was 521. The total number of literate persons in Sadikhan's Dearh was 2,922 (72.87% of the population over 6 years).

== Transport ==
State Highway 11, running from Mahammad Bazar (in Birbhum district) to Ranaghat (in Nadia district) passes through Sadikhan's Dearh. This section is locally popular as Berhampore-Jalangi Road.

== Education ==
Murshidabad Minority B.Ed College situated at Sadikhan's Dearh. It is affiliated to the University of Kalyani, offers a course in B Ed.

Sadikhan’s Dearh has both school-level and higher education institutions. Sadikhan’s Dearh Vidyaniketan is a secondary-level school that provides education to local students and plays an important role in the academic development of the area.

== Healthcare ==
Sadikhan's dearh Rural Hospital at Sadikhan's Dearh functions with 30 beds.
