= Abdul Soumik Hossain =

Indian politician

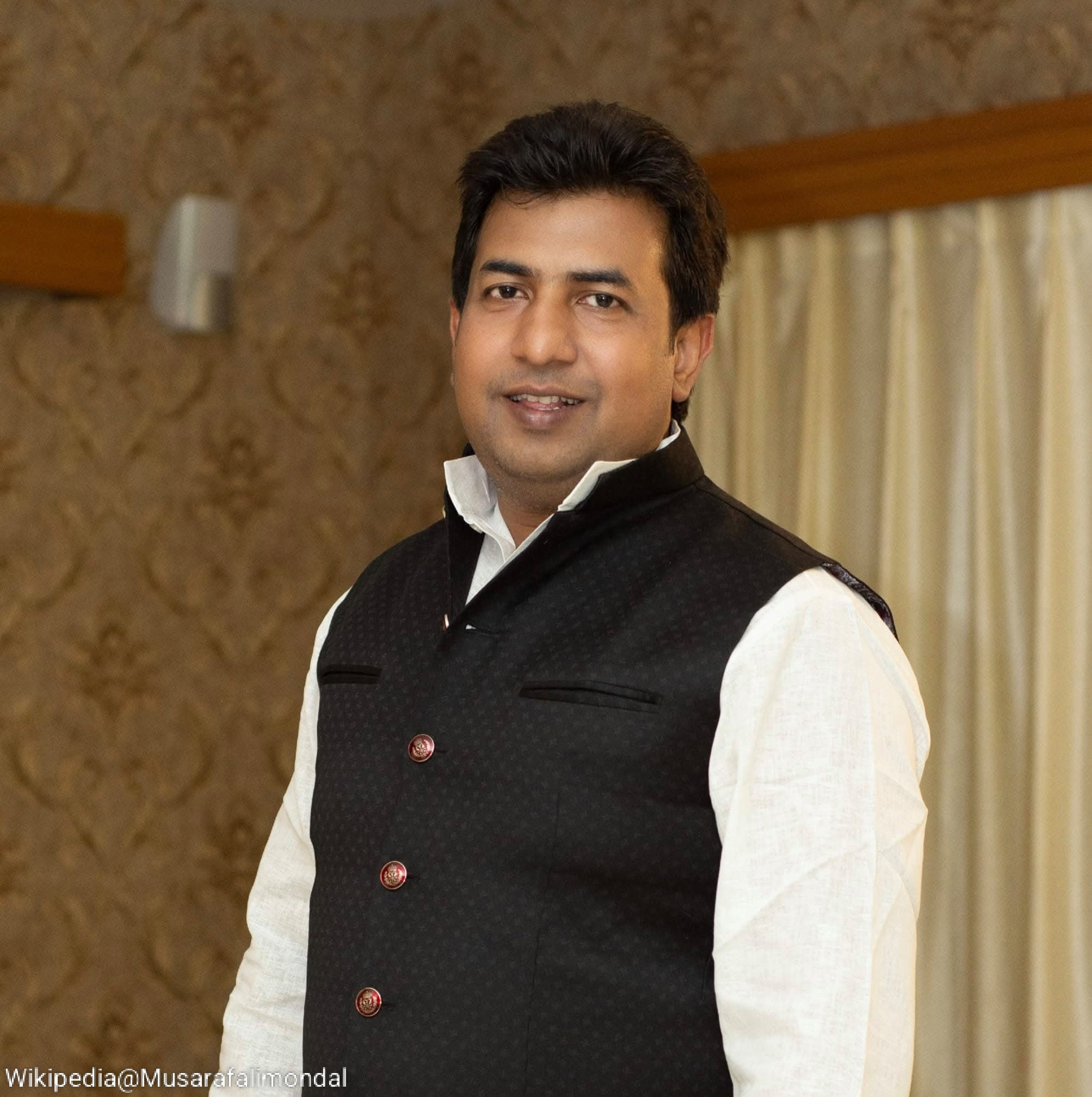

Member of the West Bengal Legislative Assembly
- In office 2 May 2021 – 2026
- Preceded by: Firoza Begam
- Succeeded by: Julfikar Ali
- Constituency: Raninagar

Personal details
- Party: AITC
- Profession: Politician

Abdul Soumik Hossain (born 2 February 1983) is an Indian politician. He is a member of the All India Trinamool Congress and he served as a Member of the West Bengal Legislative Assembly from 2021 to 2026, 63 Raninagar, Murshidabad, West Bengal since 2021. He is one of the most prominent faces of Trinamool Congress who is doing outreach program Murshidabad. Soumik has also been the Working President of Murshidabad District All India Trinamool Congress from 2017 to 2020.

Soumik Hossain has served as the State President of the Indian Youth Congress, West Bengal from 2013-2014. He was appointed the State General Secretary of the All India Trinamool Youth Congress in 2014.

He currently serves as a District Co-ordinator of All India Trinamool Congress since July 2020.

In the 2026 West Bengal Legislative Assembly election, he contested from the Raninagar Assembly constituency as an All India Trinamool Congress candidate but lost to Indian National Congress candidate Julfikar Ali.
