= Harharia Chak =

- Census Town
- Location in West Bengal, India Harharia Chak (India)
- Coordinates: 24.15363°N 88.47631°E
- Country: India
- State: West Bengal
- District: Murshidabad

Area
  - Total: 1.99 km^{2} (0.77 sq mi)

Population (2011)
  - Total: 8,435
  - Density: 4,240/km^{2} (11,000/sq mi)

Languages
  - Official: Bengali, English
- Time zone: UTC+5:30 (IST)
- Vehicle registration: WB
- Lok Sabha constituency: Murshidabad
- Vidhan Sabha constituency: Raninagar
- Website: murshidabad.nic.in

Harharia Chak is a census town in the Raninagar I CD block of the Domkal subdivision in the Murshidabad district in the Indian state of West Bengal.

== Geography ==
Cities, towns and locations in the Lalbag and Domkal subdivisions, Murshidabad district
M: municipal town, CT: census town, R: rural/ urban centre, H: historical place
Owing to space constraints in the small map, the actual locations in a larger map may vary slightly

=== Location ===
Haraharia Chak is located at 24.15363°N 88.47631°E.

=== Area overview ===
While the Lalbag subdivision is spread across both the natural physiographic regions of the district, Rarh and Bagri, the Domkal subdivision occupies the north-eastern corner of Bagri. In the map alongside, the Ganges/ Padma River flows along the northern portion. The border with Bangladesh can be seen in the north and the east. Murshidabad district shares with Bangladesh a porous international border which is notoriously crime prone (partly shown in this map). The Ganges has a tendency to change course frequently, causing severe erosion, mostly along the southern bank. The historic city of Murshidabad, a centre of major tourist attraction, is located in this area. In 1717, when Murshid Quli Khan became Subahdar, he made Murshidabad the capital of Subah Bangla (then Bengal, Bihar and Odisha). The entire area is overwhelmingly rural with over 90% of the population living in the rural areas.

Note: The map alongside presents some of the notable locations in the subdivisions. All places marked in the map are linked in the larger full screen map.

== Demographics ==
According to the 2011 Census of India, Harharia Chak had a total population of 9,411, of which 4,747 (50%) were males and 4,664 (40%) were females. Population in the age range 0–6 years was 911. The total number of literate persons in Harharia Chak was 7,206 (84.78% of the population over 6 years).

As per 2001 Census of India, Harharia Chak had a population of 8435. Males constitute 51% of the population and females 49%. Harharia Chak has an average literacy rate of 67%, higher than the national average of 59.5%: male literacy is 72%, and female literacy is 63%. In Harharia Chak, 13% of the population is under 6 years of age.

== Infrastructure ==
According to the District Census Handbook, Murshidabad, 2011, Harharia Chak covered an area of 1.99 km^{2}. The protected water-supply involved overhead tank, tap water from treated source. It had 935 domestic electric connections. Among the medical facilities it had 2 hospitals, 1 maternity & child welfare centre, 1 TB hospital/ clinic, 12 nursing homes, 1 veterinary hospital. Among the educational facilities, it had 4 primary schools, 1 middle school, 2 secondary schools. It had 1 recognised shorthand, typewriting & vocational training institute. Among the social, recreational & cultural facilities it had 1 cinema theatre, 1 auditorium/ community hall, 1 public library, 1 reading room. It had branch office of 1 nationalised bank.
