= Raninagar II =

- Community development block
- Interactive map of Raninagar II
- Coordinates: 24.2390500°N 88.5083620°E
- Country: India
- State: West Bengal
- District: Murshidabad

Government
  - Type: Federal democracy

Area
  - Total: 195.56 km^{2} (75.51 sq mi)
- Elevation: 22 m (72 ft)

Population (2011)
  - Total: 190,885
  - Density: 976.09/km^{2} (2,528.1/sq mi)

Languages
  - Official: Bengali, English

Literacy
  - Literacy (2011): 54.81%
- Time zone: UTC+5:30 (IST)
- PIN: 742308 (Raninagar)
- Telephone/STD code: 03481
- ISO 3166 code: IN-WB
- Vehicle registration: WB-57, WB-58
- Lok Sabha constituency: Mushidabad
- Vidhan Sabha constituency: Raninagar, Jalangi
- Website: murshidabad.gov.in

Raninagar II is a community development block that forms an administrative division in the Domkol subdivision of Murshidabad district in the Indian state of West Bengal.

== Geography ==
Malibari, a constituent panchayat in Raninagar II block, is located at 24°14′21″N 88°30′30″E

Raninagar II CD block lies in the Raninagar plain at the north-eastern corner of the Bagri region in Murshidabad district. The Bhagirathi River splits the district into two natural physiographic regions – Rarh on the west and Bagri on the east. The Padma River separates Murshidabad district from Malda district and Chapai Nawabganj and Rajshahi districts of Bangladesh in the north. The Raninagar plain lies between the Jalangi and Bhairab rivers. It is a low-lying area and is characterized by the nature of inundation along with many swamps

Raninagar II CD block is bounded by Rajshahi city, Paba Upazila, Motihar Thana and Charghat Upazila in Rajshahi District of Bangladesh, across the Padma, in the north, Jalangi CD block in the east, Raninagar I and Domkal CD blocks in the south and Bhagawangola II CD block in the west.

Murshidabad district has a 125.35 km long international border with Bangladesh of which 42.35 km is on land and the remaining is riverine. There are 9 blocks – Samserganj, Suti I, Suti II, Raghunathganj II, Lalgola, Bhagawangola I, Bhagawangola II, Raninagar II and Jalangi - along the Bangladesh-India border.

The Bagri or the eastern part of the district is a low lying alluvial plain with the shape of an isosceles triangle. The Ganges/Padma and the Bhagirathi form the two equal sides; the Jalangi forms the entire base; other offshoots of the Ganges meander within the area. It is vulnerable to flooding by the Bhagirathi and other rivers. The main rivers of this region are Bhairab, Jalangi, Chhoto Bhairab, Sialmari and Gobra Nala. All these rivers are distributaries of the main branch of the Ganges. The rivers are in their decaying stages.

A major problem is river bank erosion. As of 2013, an estimated 2.4 million people reside along the banks of the Ganges alone in Murshidabad district. Between 1931 and 1977, 26,769 hectares have been eroded and many villages have been fully submerged. 1980-1990 was a decade of erosion for this district and during the decade Giria, Sekhalipur, Khejustala, Mithipur, Fajilpur, Rajapur, Akheriganj, Parashpur villages were badly affected. Many families living along the Ganges continue to be affected. As for example, in 2007 severe erosion occurred in Lalgola, Bhagawangola II, Farakka, Raninagar II blocks. During 2008 Bamnabad of Raninagar II block was affected by erosion and 168 families were shifted.

See also - River bank erosion along the Ganges in Malda and Murshidabad districts

Raninagar II CD block has an area of 175.13 km^{2}. It has 1 panchayat samity, 9 gram panchayats, 127 gram sansads (village councils), 36 mouzas and 30 inhabited villages. Raninagar police station serves this block. Headquarters of this CD block is at Raninagar.

Gram panchayats of Raninagar II block/ panchayat samiti are: Kalinagar I, Kalinagar II, Katlamari I, Katlamari II, Malibari I, Malibari II, Rajapur, Raninagar I and Raninagar II.

Raninagar-I Gram Panchayat is situated at Raninagar Bazar, There are 17 nos. of sansad in the G.P. area. There are three moujas 83-Babaltali, 82-Deputipara, 81-Godhanpara. Ilsemari, Godhanpara, Panipia, Deputipara, Raninagar Purba, Raninagar Paschim, Raninagar Madhya, Babaltali Sarkarpara, Babaltali Mondalpara, Najarana, Lalchandabad are the villages of the G.P. The name of the prodhan of Raninagar-I G.P. Champa Khatun Bibi.

== Demographics ==
=== Population ===
According to the 2011 Census of India, Raninagar II CD block had a total population of 190,885, all of which were rural. There were 97,359 (51%) males and 93,526 (49%) females. Population below 6 years numbered 26,382. Scheduled Castes numbered 22,189 (11.62%) and Scheduled Tribes numbered 550 (0.29%).

As per 2001 census, Raninagar II block has a total population of 155,612, out of which 80,635 were males and 74,977 were females. Raninagar II block registered a population growth of 17.29 per cent during the 1991-2001 decade. Decadal growth for the district was 23.70 per cent. Decadal growth in West Bengal was 17.84 per cent.

Decadal Population Growth Rate (%)

- Raninagar II CD block
- Murshidabad district
- West Bengal

The decadal growth of population in Raninagar II CD block in 2001-2011 was 22.34%.

The decadal growth rate of population in Murshidabad district was as follows: 33.5% in 1951–61, 28.6% in 1961–71, 25.5% in 1971–81, 28.2% in 1981-91, 23.8% in 1991-2001 and 21.1% in 2001-11. The decadal growth rate for West Bengal in 2001-11 was 13.93%.

The decadal growth rate of population in neighbouring Rajshahi District, across the Ganges, in Bangladesh, was 13.48% for the decade 2001–2011, down from 21.19% in the decade 1991-2001.

There are reports of Bangladeshi infiltrators entering Murshidabad district.

=== Villages ===
Large villages in Raninagar II CD block were (2011 population figures in brackets): Brindabanpur (4,815), Malibari (11,586), Mridadpur (4,850), Tejsinghpur (7,702), Ramnagar Doemkanun (11,781), Godhanpara (14,173), Babaltali (20,177), Jhaubaria (5,752), Majhardiar (6,176), Katlamari (33,290), Nabipur (9,092), Rajanagar (17,194) and Char Bansgora (6,585).

=== Literacy ===
As per the 2011 census, the total number of literate persons in Raninagar II CD block was 104,623 (63.60% of the population over 6 years) out of which males numbered 54,404 (64.78% of the male population over 6 years) and females numbered 50,219 (62.36% of the female population over 6 years). The gender disparity (the difference between female and male literacy rates) was 2.42%.

See also – List of West Bengal districts ranked by literacy rate

Literacy in CD blocks of
Murshidabad district
Jangipur subdivision
Farakka – 59.75%
Samserganj – 54.98%
Suti I – 58.40%
Suti II – 55.23%
Raghunathganj I – 64.49%
Raghunathganj II – 61.17%
Sagardighi – 65.27%
Lalbag subdivision
Murshidabad-Jiaganj – 69.14%
Bhagawangola I - 57.22%
Bhagawangola II – 53.48%
Lalgola– 64.32%
Nabagram – 70.83%
Sadar subdivision
Berhampore – 73.51%
Beldanga I – 70.06%
Beldanga II – 67.86%
Hariharpara – 69.20%
Naoda – 66.09%
Kandi subdivision
Kandi – 65.13%
Khargram – 63.56%
Burwan – 68.96%
Bharatpur I – 62.93%
Bharatpur II – 66.07%
Domkol subdivision
Domkal – 55.89%
Raninagar I – 57.81%
Raninagar II – 54.81%
Jalangi – 58.73%
Source: 2011 Census: CD Block Wise
Primary Census Abstract Data

=== Language and religion ===
Religion in Raninagar II CD block (2011)
Islam	80.78%
Hinduism	19.03%
Other or not stated	0.19%

In the 2011 census, Muslims numbered 154,188 and formed 80.78% of the population in Raninagar II CD block. Hindus numbered 36,311 and formed 19.03% of the population. Others numbered 366 and formed 0.19% of the population. In Raninagar I and Raninagar II CD blocks taken together, while the proportion of Muslims increased from 78.77% in 1991 to 80.03% in 2001, the proportion of Hindus declined from 21.22% in 1991 to 19.78% in 2001.

Murshidabad district had 4,707,573 Muslims who formed 66.27% of the population, 2,359,061 Hindus who formed 33.21% of the population, and 37, 173 persons belonging to other religions who formed 0.52% of the population, in the 2011 census. While the proportion of Muslim population in the district increased from 61.40% in 1991 to 63.67% in 2001, the proportion of Hindu population declined from 38.39% in 1991 to 35.92% in 2001.

Bengali is the predominant language, spoken by 99.91% of the population.

== Rural poverty ==
As per the Human Development Report 2004 for West Bengal, the rural poverty ratio in Murshidabad district was 46.12%. Purulia, Bankura and Birbhum districts had higher rural poverty ratios. These estimates were based on Central Sample data of NSS 55th round 1999-2000.

== Economy ==
=== Livelihood ===
In Raninagar II CD block in 2011, amongst the class of total workers, cultivators numbered 17,312 and formed 26.92%, agricultural labourers numbered 32,584 and formed 50.66%, household industry workers numbered 4,453 and formed 6.94% and other workers numbered 9,957 and formed 15.48%.

=== Infrastructure ===
There are 30 inhabited villages in Raninagar II CD block. 100% villages have power supply and drinking water supply. 15 villages (50.00%) have post offices. 27 villages (90.00%) have telephones (including landlines, public call offices and mobile phones). 17 villages (56.67%) have a pucca approach road and 19 villages (63.33%) have transport communication (includes bus service, rail facility and navigable waterways). 10 villages (33.33%) have agricultural credit societies and 7 villages (23.33%) have banks.

=== Agriculture ===
Persons engaged in agriculture
in Raninagar II CD block
1. Bargadars (5.01%)
2. Patta holders (9.14%)
3. Small farmers (5.38%)
4. Marginal farmers (29.4%)
5. Agricultural labourers (51.1%)

From 1977 onwards major land reforms took place in West Bengal. Land in excess of land ceiling was acquired and distributed amongst the peasants. Following land reforms land ownership pattern has undergone transformation. In 2013–14, persons engaged in agriculture in Raninagar II CD block could be classified as follows: bargadars 3,196 (5.01%), patta (document) holders 5,834 (9.14%), small farmers (possessing land between 1 and 2 hectares) 3,434 (5.38%), marginal farmers (possessing land up to 1 hectare) 18,753 (39.39%) and agricultural labourers 32,584 (51.07%).

Raninagar II CD block had 100 fertiliser depots, 1 seed store and 39 fair price shops in 2013-14.

In 2013–14, Raninagar II CD block produced 4,088 tonnes of Aman paddy, the main winter crop from 1,367 hectares, 8,546 tonnes of Boro paddy (spring crop) from 2,263 hectares, 3,227 tonnes of Aus paddy (summer crop) from 1,044 hectares, 20,044 tonnes of wheat from 8,706 hectares, 16 tonnes of maize from 6 hectares, 115,879 tonnes of jute from 9,315 hectares and 15,026 tonnes of potatoes from 656 hectares. It also produced pulses and oilseeds.

In 2013–14, the total area irrigated in Raninagar II CD block was 11,899 hectares, out of which 399 hectares were irrigated by deep tube well and 11,500 hectares by other means.

=== Silk and handicrafts ===
Murshidabad is famous for its silk industry since the Middle Ages. There are three distinct categories in this industry, namely (i) Mulberry cultivation and silkworm rearing (ii) Peeling of raw silk (iii) Weaving of silk fabrics.

Ivory carving is an important cottage industry from the era of the Nawabs. The main areas where this industry has flourished are Khagra and Jiaganj. 99% of ivory craft production is exported. In more recent years sandalwood etching has become more popular than ivory carving. Bell metal and Brass utensils are manufactured in large quantities at Khagra, Berhampore, Kandi and Jangipur. Beedi making has flourished in the Jangipur subdivision.

=== Banking ===
In 2013–14, Raninagar II CD block had offices of 5 commercial banks and 4 gramin banks.

=== Backward Regions Grant Fund ===
Murshidabad district is listed as a backward region and receives financial support from the Backward Regions Grant Fund. The fund, created by the Government of India, is designed to redress regional imbalances in development. As of 2012, 272 districts across the country were listed under this scheme. The list includes 11 districts of West Bengal.

== Transport ==
Raninagar I CD block has 2 ferry services and 3 originating/ terminating bus routes. The nearest railway station is 40 km from the CD block headquarters.

== Education ==
In 2013–14, Raninagar II CD block had 96 primary schools with 10,866 students, 20 middle schools with 2,113 students, 4 high schools with 5,136 students and 8 higher secondary schools with 17,460 students. Raninagar II CD block had 1 technical/ professional institution with 149 students and 359 institutions for special and non-formal education with 16,029 students.

G.D.College, a self-financed general degree Minority status college, was established at Shaikhpara in 2007. Affiliated with the University of Kalyani it offers honours courses in Bengali, English, Sanskrit, Arabic, history, Islamic history, philosophy, political science, physics, chemistry, geography, economics, mathematics and environmental science.

Shaikhpara A.R.M. Polytechnic at Shaikhpara offers diploma courses in food processing technology, computer software technology and medical lab technology.

In Raninagar II CD block, amongst the 30 inhabited villages, all villages have a school, 21 villages have more than 1 primary school, 24 villages have at least 1 primary and 1 middle school and 11 villages had at least 1 middle and 1 secondary school.

== Healthcare ==
In 2014, Raninagar II CD block had 1 block primary health centre, 2 primary health centres and 1 private nursing home with total 46 beds and 8 doctors (excluding private bodies). It had 25 family welfare subcentres. 5,880 patients were treated indoor and 143,296 patients were treated outdoor in the hospitals, health centres and subcentres of the CD Block.

Raninagar II CD block has Raninagar (Godhanpara) Rural Hospital at Raninagar (with 15 beds), Bilpocha Kobra Primary Health Centre at Nabipur (with 6 beds) and Katlamari PHC (with 10 beds).

Raninagar II CD block is one of the areas of Murshidabad district where ground water is affected by a high level of arsenic contamination. The WHO guideline for arsenic in drinking water is 10 mg/ litre, and the Indian Standard value is 50 mg/ litre. All but one of the 26 blocks of Murshidabad district have arsenic contamination above the WHO level, all but two of the blocks have arsenic concentration above the Indian Standard value and 17 blocks have arsenic concentration above 300 mg/litre. The maximum concentration in Raninagar II CD Block is 1,652 mg/litre.
