= Julfikar Ali =

Indian politician in West Bengal

- জুলফিকার আলি

Leader of Congress Legislative Party, West Bengal
- Incumbent
- Assumed office 20 June 2026
- Deputy: Motab Shaikh
- Preceded by: Abdul Mannan(2021)

Member of the West Bengal Legislative Assembly
- Incumbent
- Assumed office 9 May 2026
- Preceded by: Abdul Soumik Hossain
- Constituency: Raninagar

Personal details
- Party: Indian National Congress
- Spouse: Rubina Yasmin
- Parent: Habibur Rahaman
- Profession: Politician, Businessman

Julfikar Ali (Bengali: জুলফিকার আলী) is a politician from West Bengal. He is a member of West Bengal Legislative Assembly, from Raninagar Assembly constituency. He is a member of Indian National Congress.

== Early life and education ==
Ali is from Murshidabad district of West Bengal. His educational qualification is Madhyamik Pariksha from West Bengal Board of Madrasah Education in the year 2000.

== Political career ==
He is a member of West Bengal Legislative Assembly, from Raninagar Assembly constituency.

== Electoral performance ==
West Bengal Legislative Assembly
| Year | Constituency | Party | Votes | % | Opponent | Party | Votes | % | Margin | Result |
|---|---|---|---|---|---|---|---|---|---|---|
| 2026 | Raninagar | INC | 79,423 | 33.48 | Abdul Soumik Hossain | AITC | 76,722 | 32.34 | 2,701 | Won |

== See also ==
- 2026 West Bengal Legislative Assembly election
- List of chief ministers of West Bengal
- West Bengal Legislative Assembly
