= Sagarpara =

- census town ( more than 10000 population )
- Location in West Bengal, India Sagarpara (India)
- Coordinates: 24.23°N 88.69°E
- Country: India
- State: West Bengal
- District: Murshidabad
- Elevation: 15 m (49 ft)

Population (2011)
  - Total: 27,385

Languages
  - Official: Bengali, English
- Time zone: UTC+5:30 (IST)
- PIN: 742306
- Lok Sabha constituency: Murshidabad
- Vidhan Sabha constituency: Jalangi
- Website: murshidabad.nic.in

Sagarpara is a village and gram panchayat in the Jalangi CD block in the Domkol subdivision of Murshidabad district in West Bengal, India. It is 2.5 kilometres from the Padma River.

== History ==
Like many other small villages in Ganges Delta, Ramakantapur, Sagarpara was a small river port during the time of Mughal. Until the year of Indian independence in 1947, it was just a small village backed by a port to ferry jute through Jalangi River, a tributary of Padma River. The partition of India saw Sagarpara grow due to an influx of settlers from East Bengal. The Bangladesh Liberation War in 1971 saw another surge of refugees in this Village located only 2.5 kilometres from the Bangladesh-India border.

Population and commerce in Sagarpara was growing fast after 1971 due to new settlers who preferred to build a house in this Village due to its high land surrounded by small rivers. The village does not get flooded because it is located on the high natural barrage side of the river. It survived like a water-locked island during devastating floods of 1978 and 1997, which forced its neighboring population to migrate into the village.

== Geography ==
Cities, towns and locations in the Lalbag and Domkal subdivisions, Murshidabad district
M: municipal town, CT: census town, R: rural/ urban centre, H: historical place
Owing to space constraints in the small map, the actual locations in a larger map may vary slightly

=== Location ===
Sagarpara is located at 24.23°N 88.69°E.

=== Area overview ===
While the Lalbag subdivision is spread across both the natural physiographic regions of the district, Rarh and Bagri, the Domkal subdivision occupies the north-eastern corner of Bagri. In the map alongside, the Ganges/ Padma River flows along the northern portion. The border with Bangladesh can be seen in the north and the east. Murshidabad district shares with Bangladesh a porous international border which is notoriously crime prone (partly shown in this map). The Ganges has a tendency to change course frequently, causing severe erosion, mostly along the southern bank. The historic city of Murshidabad, a centre of major tourist attraction, is located in this area. In 1717, when Murshid Quli Khan became Subahdar, he made Murshidabad the capital of Subah Bangla (then Bengal, Bihar and Odisha). The entire area is overwhelmingly rural with over 90% of the population living in the rural areas.

Note: The map alongside presents some of the notable locations in the subdivisions. All places marked in the map are linked in the larger full screen map.

== Culture ==
There is a masjid situated near Sagarpara Bazaar, opposite Sagarpara High School.

== Demographics ==
According to the 2011 Census of India, Sagarpara had a total population of 27,385, of which 14,096 (51%) were males and 13,289 (49%) were females. Population in the age range 0–6 years was 3,375. The total number of literate persons in Sagarpara was 1,7046 (71.00% of the population over 6 years).

== Economy ==
The local commerce is based on export of jute, banana, cucumber, brinjal, onion, other vegetables, grain and betel leaves. The village has nearly 500 shops and 30 small industrial units (SIU).

The population is engaged in trades, small scale industries, agricultural and construction workers and supports both Hindu and Muslim communities.

== Education ==
=== B.ed colleges ===
- Sagarpara Teachers Training Institute
- Antony B.ed College

=== Schools ===
Sagarpara has four schools:

- Ananda Marga Primary School
- Sagarpara Primary School
- Sagarpara High School (Vocational)
- Sagarpara High School

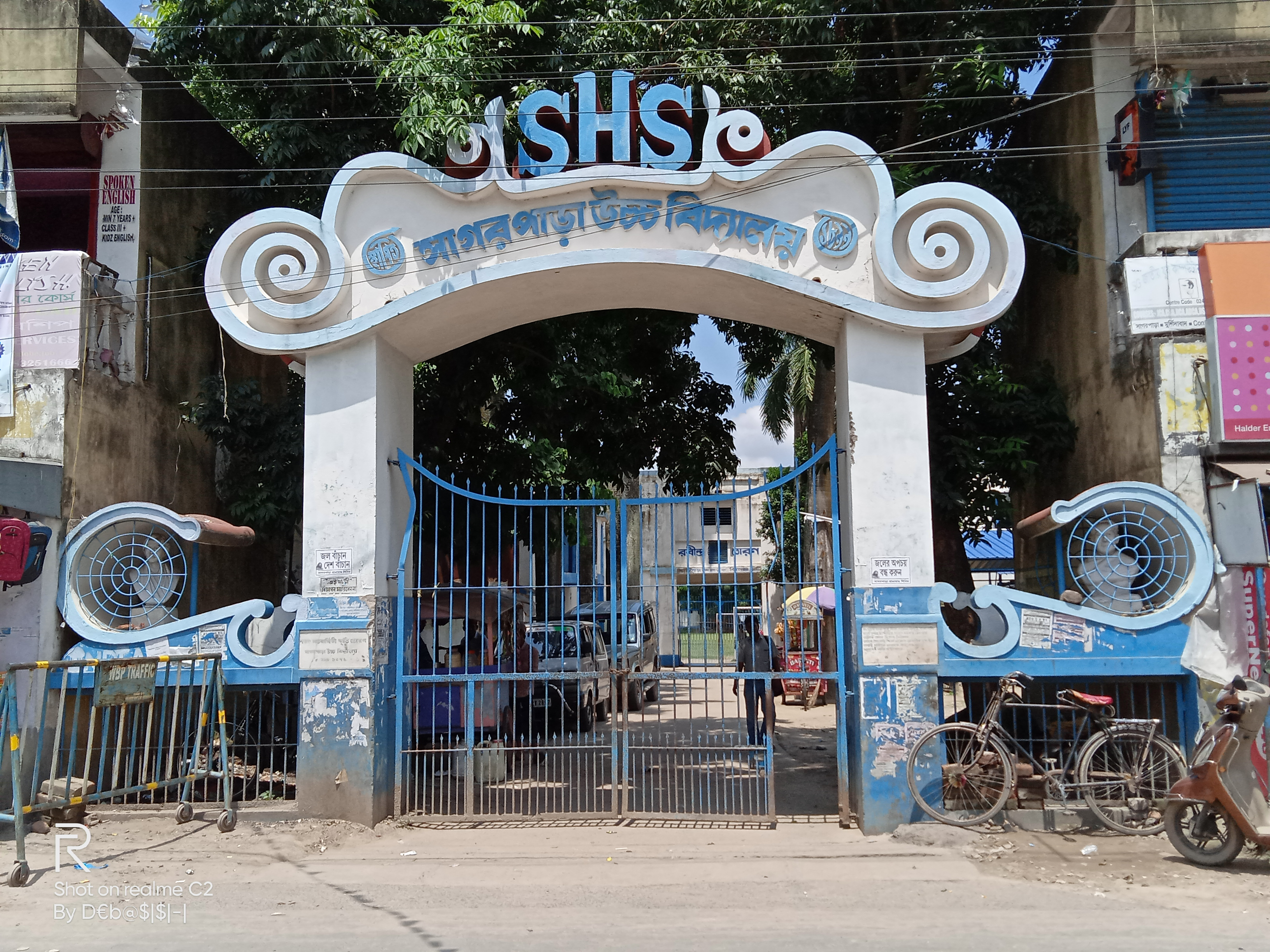
Sagarpara High School

- Sagarpara Girls High School

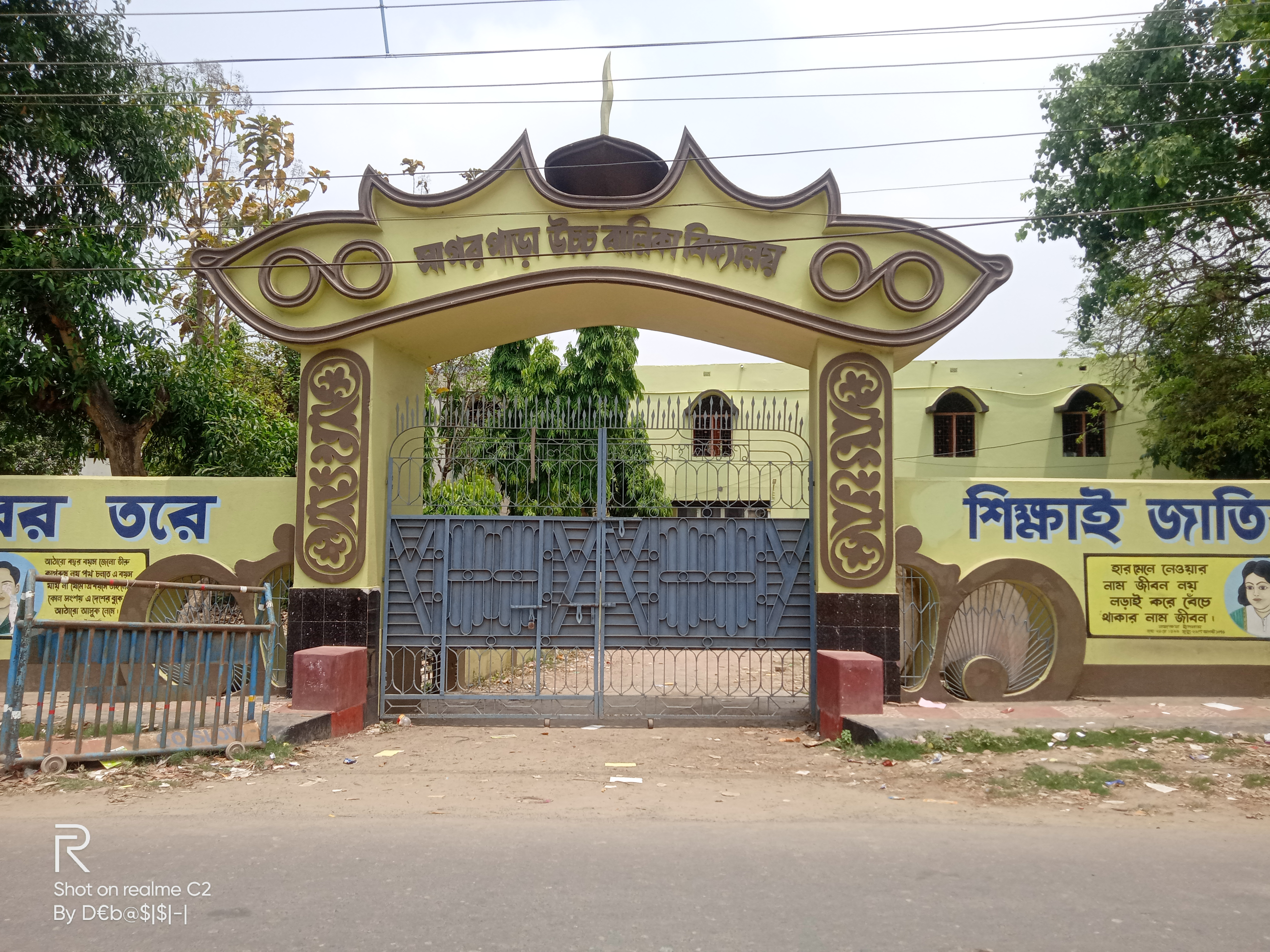
Sagarpara Girls High School

== Transport ==
The village is situated about 2.5 kilometres from the international border between India and Bangladesh, and is crossed by West Bengal State Highway 11. Mainly, communication depends on bus route from Krishnanagar, Nadia to Sagarpara (via Karimpur). From the other end, Sagarpara ( সাগরপাড়া ) is connected with Baharampur, District headquarters.
