= Jalangi =

- Village
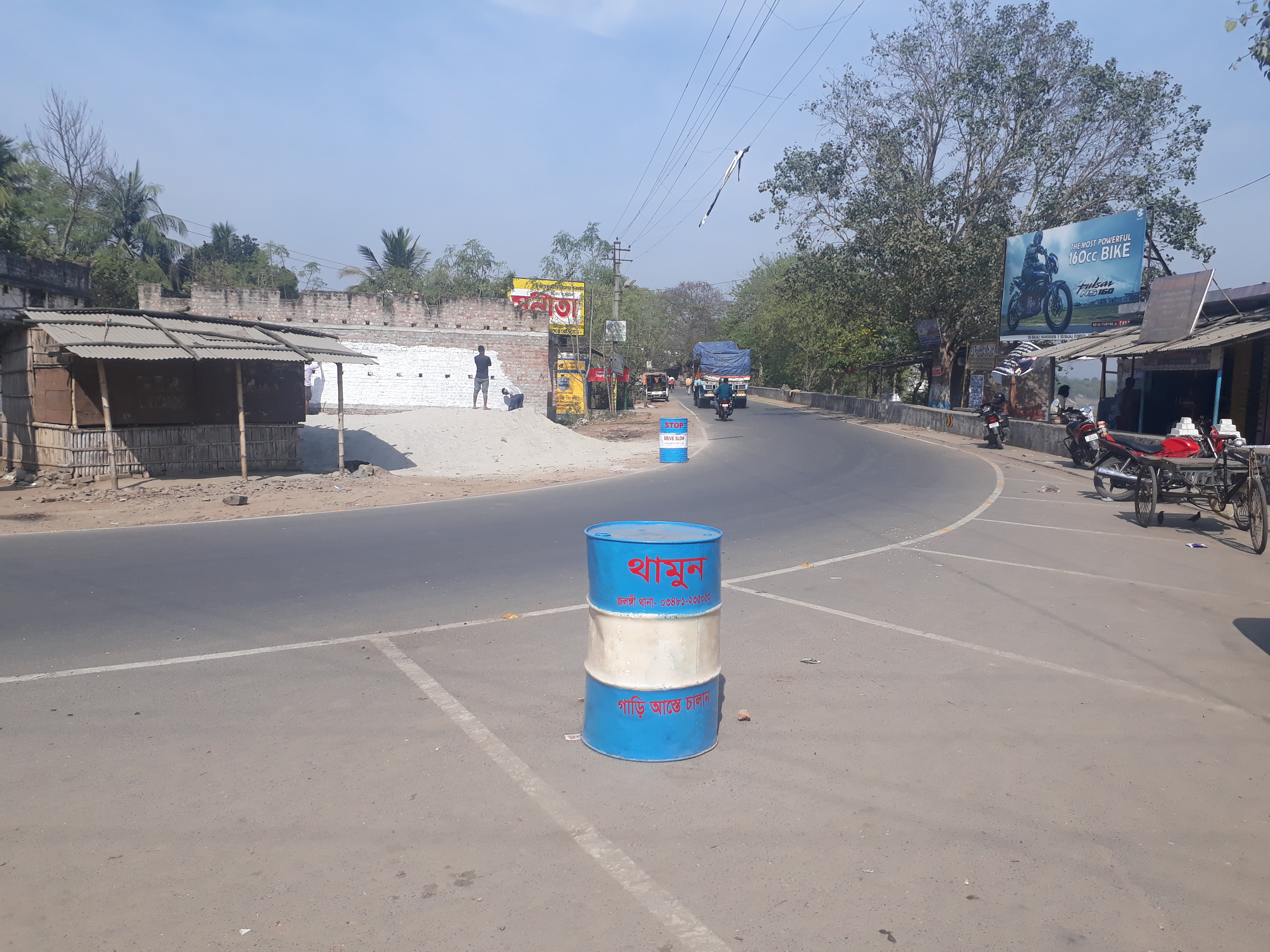
- State Highway 11 in Jalangi village

- Location in West Bengal, India Jalangi (India)
- Coordinates: 24.1311°N 88.6894°E
- Country: India
- State: West Bengal
- District: Murshidabad

Languages
  - Official: Bengali, English
- Time zone: UTC+5:30 (IST)
- PIN: 742305
- Telephone/STD code: 03481
- Lok Sabha constituency: Murshidabad
- Vidhan Sabha constituency: Jalangi
- Website: murshidabad.gov.in

Jalangi is a village, with a police station, identified in 2011 census, in Jalangi CD Block in Domkol subdivision of Murshidabad district in the state of West Bengal, India. The village is situated along the bank of the Padma River.

== Geography ==
Cities, towns and locations in the Lalbag and Domkal subdivisions, Murshidabad district
M: municipal town, CT: census town, R: rural/ urban centre, H: historical place
Owing to space constraints in the small map, the actual locations in a larger map may vary slightly

=== Location ===
Jalangi is located at 24.1311°N 88.6894°E.

=== Area overview ===
While the Lalbag subdivision is spread across both the natural physiographic regions of the district, Rarh and Bagri, the Domkal subdivision occupies the north-eastern corner of Bagri. In the map alongside, the Ganges/ Padma River flows along the northern portion. The border with Bangladesh can be seen in the north and the east. Murshidabad district shares with Bangladesh a porous and notoriously crime-prone international border (partly shown in this map). The Ganges has a tendency to change course frequently, causing severe erosion, mostly along the southern bank. The historic city of Murshidabad, a centre of major tourist attraction, is located in this area. In 1717, when Murshid Quli Khan became Subahdar, he made Murshidabad the capital of Subah Bangla (then Bengal, Bihar and Odisha). The entire area is overwhelmingly rural, with over 90% of the population living in the rural areas.

Note: The map alongside presents some of the notable locations in the subdivisions. All places marked in the map are linked in the larger full-screen map.

== Civic administration ==
=== Police station ===
Jalangi police station has jurisdiction over the Jalangi CD block.

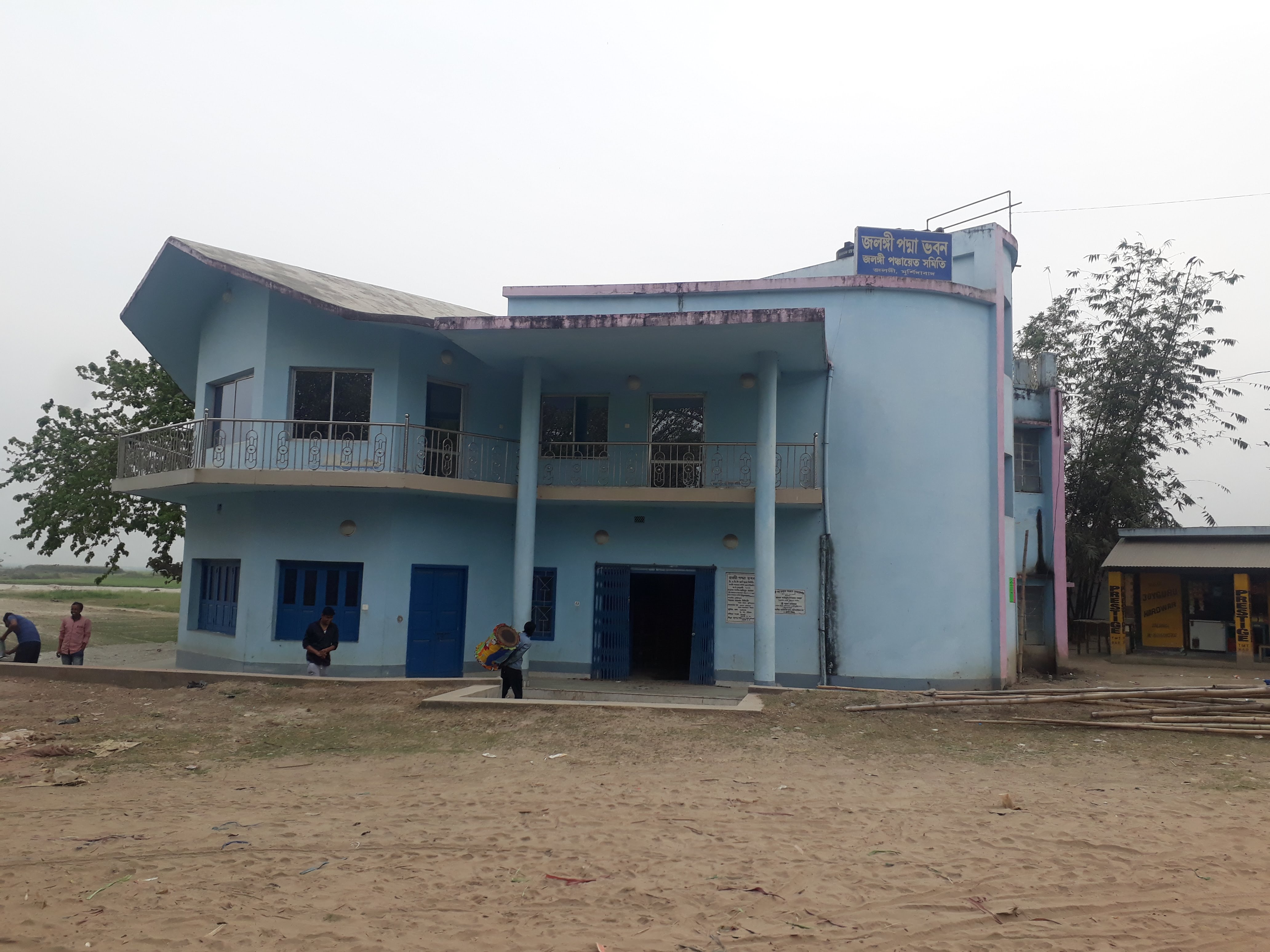
Padma Bhavan, the Government building at Jalangi

=== CD block HQ ===
The headquarters of the Jalangi CD block are located at Jortala, Jalangi.

== Transport ==
State Highway 11 running from Mohammad Bazar (in Birbhum district) to Ranaghat (in Nadia district) passes through Jalangi. Buses are available to the district headquarters Baharampur.

== Education ==
Jalangi Mahavidyalaya was established in 2010 at Jalangi. Subjects taught in the college are: Bengali, English, history, geography, and education. It also refers M.A. Distance

== See also ==
- River bank erosion along the Ganges in Malda and Murshidabad districts
