= Raninagar Assembly constituency =

Raninagar
- Constituency No. 63 for the West Bengal Legislative Assembly
- Interactive Map Outlining Raninagar Assembly Constituency

Constituency details
- Country: India
- Region: East India
- State: West Bengal
- District: Murshidabad
- Lok Sabha constituency: Murshidabad
- Established: 1957
- Total electors: 256,101
- Reservation: None

Member of Legislative Assembly
- 18th West Bengal Legislative Assembly
- Incumbent Julfikar Ali
- Party: INC
- Elected year: 2026

Raninagar Assembly constituency is an assembly constituency in Murshidabad district in the Indian state of West Bengal.

== Overview ==
As per orders of the Delimitation Commission, No. 63 Raninagar Assembly constituency covers Raninagar I community development block, Kalinagar I, Kalinagar II, Malibari I, Malibari II and Raninagar I gram panchayats of Raninagar II community development block and Dhulauri gram panchayat of Domkal community development block.

Raninagar Assembly constituency is part of No. 11 Murshidabad (Lok Sabha constituency).

== Members of the Legislative Assembly ==
Year	Name	Party
1957	Syed Badruddin	Independent politician
1962	Syed Badruddin	Independent politician
2011	Firoza Begam	Indian National Congress
2016	Firoza Begam	Indian National Congress
2021	Abdul Soumik Hossain	Trinamool Congress
2026	Julfikar Ali	Indian National Congress

== Election Results ==
=== 2026 ===
Mla julfikar Alihttps://www.indiatoday.in/elections/story/raninagar-assembly-election-results-2026-live-updates-west-bengal-vote-counting-seat-constituency-candidates-leading-trailing-wbaelb-2905670-2026-05-04

2026 West Bengal Legislative Assembly election: Raninagar
Party	Candidate	Votes	%	±%
INC	Julfikar Ali	79,423	33.48	▲8.59
AITC	Abdul Soumik Hossain	76,722	32.34	▼28.45
CPI(M)	Jamal Hossain	48,587	20.48	
BJP	Rana Pratap Singha Roy	22,728	9.58	▲0.06
AJUP	Yasser Haider	2,566	1.08	
NOTA	None of the above	2,240	0.94	▼0.31
Majority		2,701	1.14	▼34.76
Turnout		237,202	97.0	▲10.31
INC gain from AITC		Swing		

=== 2021 ===
In the 2021 election, Abdul Soumik Hossain of Trinamool Congress defeated his nearest rival, Firoza Begam of Congress.

2021 West Bengal Legislative Assembly election: Raninagar
Party	Candidate	Votes	%	±%
AITC	Abdul Soumik Hossain	134,957	60.79	
INC	Firoza Begam	55,255	24.89	−33.58
BJP	Mst. Masuara Khatun	21,138	9.52	+4.42
ISF	Golam Masum Reja	2,754	1.24	
NOTA	None of the above	2,774	1.25	
Majority		79,702	35.9	
Turnout		222,016	86.69	
AITC gain from INC		Swing		

=== 2016 ===
In the 2016 election, Firoza Begam of Congress defeated her nearest rival, Dr. Humayun Kabir of Trinamool Congress.

West Bengal assembly elections, 2016: Raninagar constituency
Party	Candidate	Votes	%	±%
INC	Firoza Begam	111,132	58.47	+12.02
AITC	Dr. Humayun Kabir	62,750	33.01	
BJP	Basu Basak	9,693	5.10	+3.18
WPOI	Golam Mostafa Mondal	2,441	1.28	
NOTA	None of the above	1,715	0.90	
SUCI(C)	Manirul Islam	1,405	0.74	
Independent	Md. Yearul Islam	946	0.50	
Turnout		190,082	84.86	−2.98
INC hold		Swing		

=== 2011 ===
In the 2011 election, Firoza Begum of Congress defeated her nearest rival Maksuda Begum of Forward Bloc.

West Bengal assembly elections, 2011: Raninagar constituency
Party	Candidate	Votes	%	±%
INC	Firoza Begam	76,092	46.45	
AIFB	Maksuda Begum	75,003	45.79	
BJP	Dinesh Mondal	3,151	1.92	
IPFB	Tapan Kumar Hore	2,946		
SUCI(C)	Abdul Aktar Sarkar	2,262		
MLKSC	Md. Rejaul Haque	1,693		
Independent	Nur Mohammed	1,495		
Independent	Jalauddin Mondal	1,169		
Turnout		163,811	87.84	
INC win (new seat)				

=== 1962 ===
The Raninagar assembly seat existed for a short period in 1957 and 1962. Syed Badruddin, Independent, won in both the years.
