= Padma River =

Major river in Bangladesh

Coordinates: 23°16′N 90°36′E

Padma
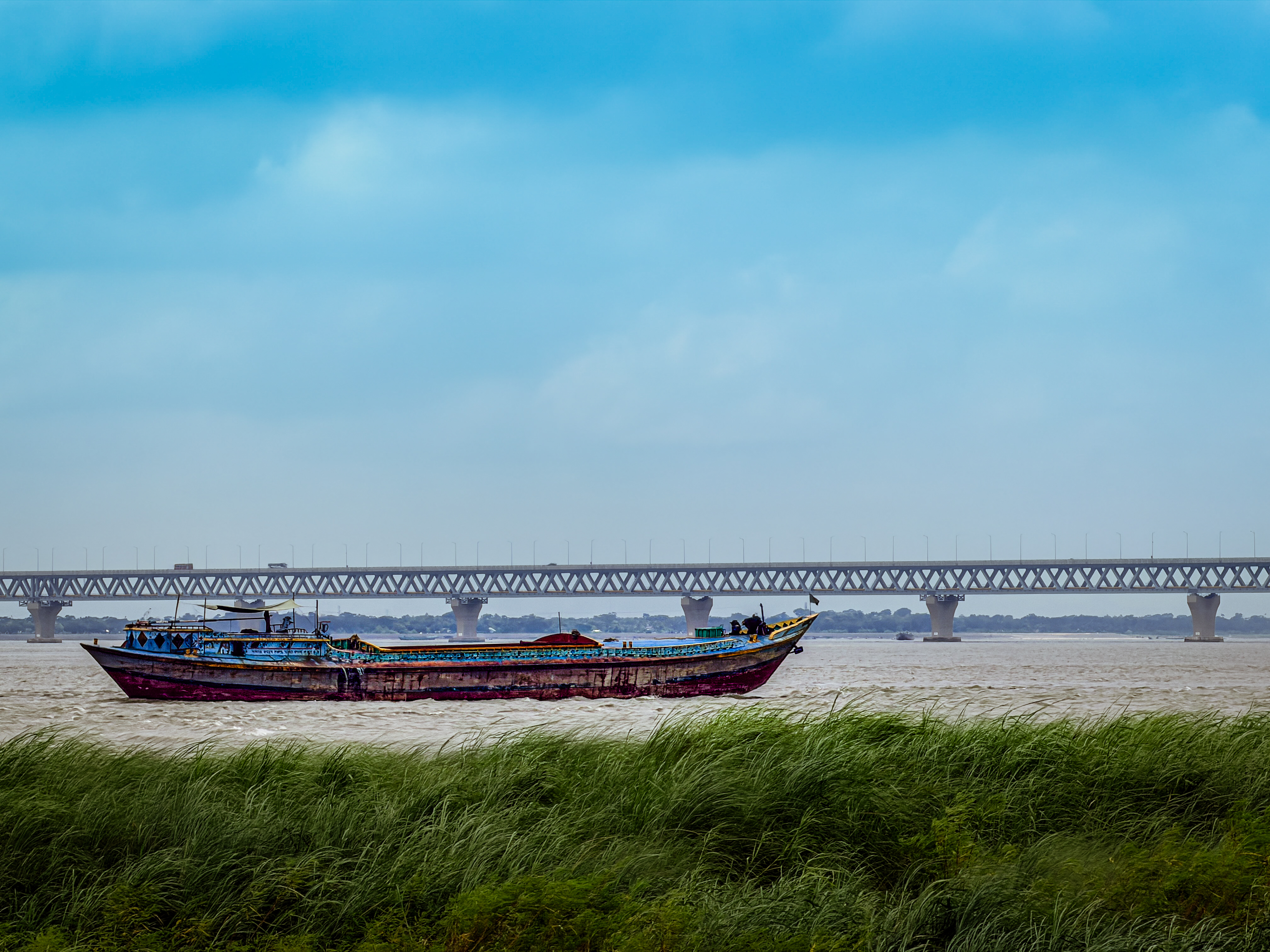
- Padma River in Bangladesh

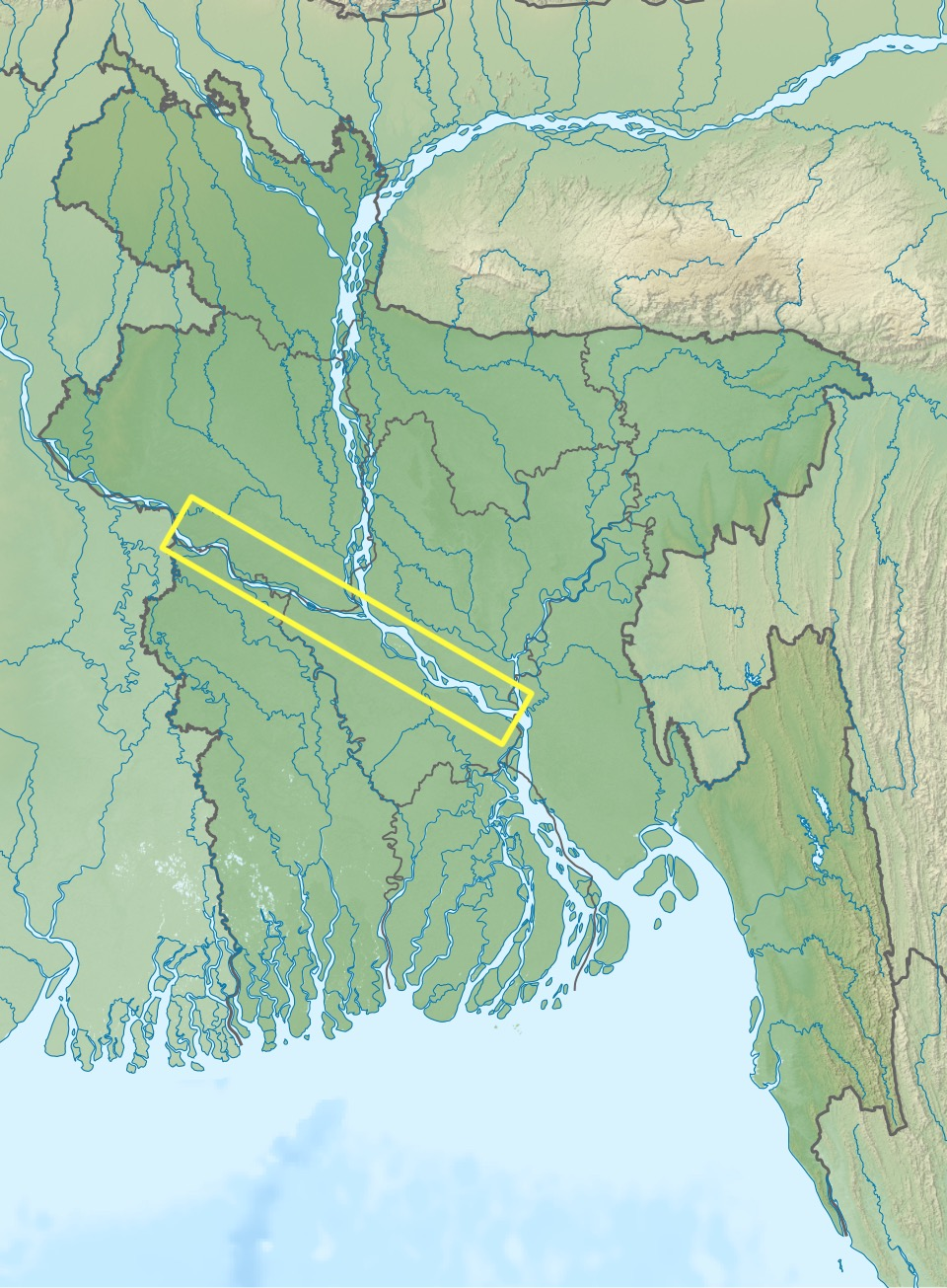
- Location in Bangladesh
- Native name: পদ্মা (Bengali)

Location
- Countries: Bangladesh, India
- Districts: India: Murshidabad Bangladesh: Munshiganj; Pabna; Manikganj; Rajshahi; Kushtia; Nawabganj; Faridpur; Madaripur; Rajbari; Shariatpur; Chandpur

Physical characteristics
- Source
  - location: Bifurcation of the Ganges at Giria, India, and The Gangotri Glacier in the middle of Himalayans
- Mouth
  - location: Lower Meghna
- Length: 356 km (221 mi)
- Basin size: 1,487,657.3 km^{2} (574,387.7 mi^{2})
- Discharge
  - average: (Period: 1971–2000)34,938.1 m^{3}/s (1,233,830 cu ft/s)
  - minimum: During dry season 15,000 m^{3}/s (530,000 cu ft/s)
  - maximum: During monsoon season 750,000 m^{3}/s (26,000,000 cu ft/s)

Basin features
- River system: Ganges River
- Bridges: Padma Bridge; Lalon Shah Bridge; Hardinge Bridge

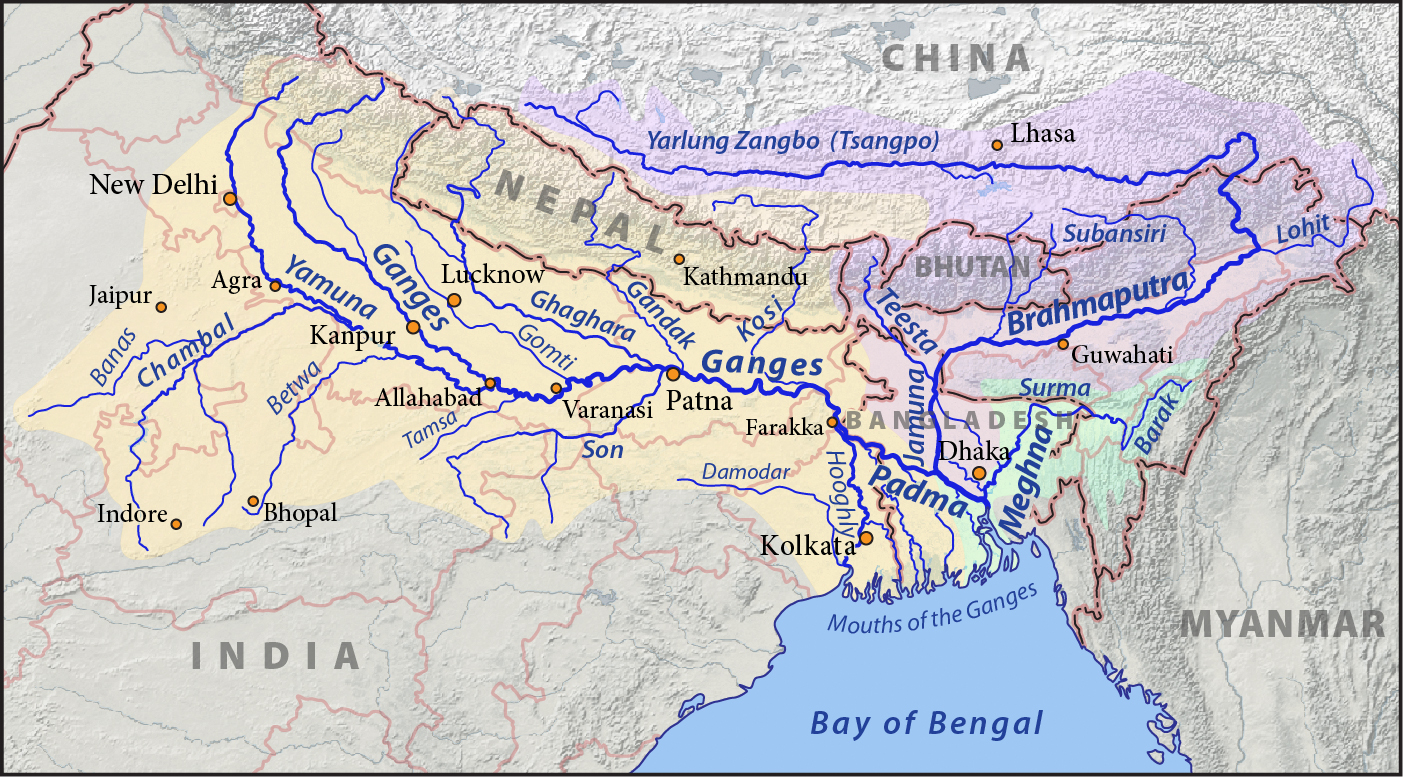
A map showing the major rivers that flow into the Bay of Bengal, including Padma.

The Padma (Bengali: পদ্মা, romanized: Pôdmā) is a major river in Bangladesh. It is the eastern and main distributary of the Ganges, flowing generally southeast for 356 kilometres (221 mi) to its confluence with the Meghna River, near the Bay of Bengal. The city of Rajshahi is located on the banks of the river. Since 1966, over 66,000 hectares of land have been lost to erosion of the Padma. The Padma River is also an important source of fisheries and supports livelihoods for communities living along its banks.

== History ==
=== Etymology ===
The Padma, Sanskrit for lotus flower, is mentioned in ancient Hindu scripts as a byname for the Goddess Lakshmi. There is also a narration of Lakshmi’s connection to this river told in the Tripura Rahasya.

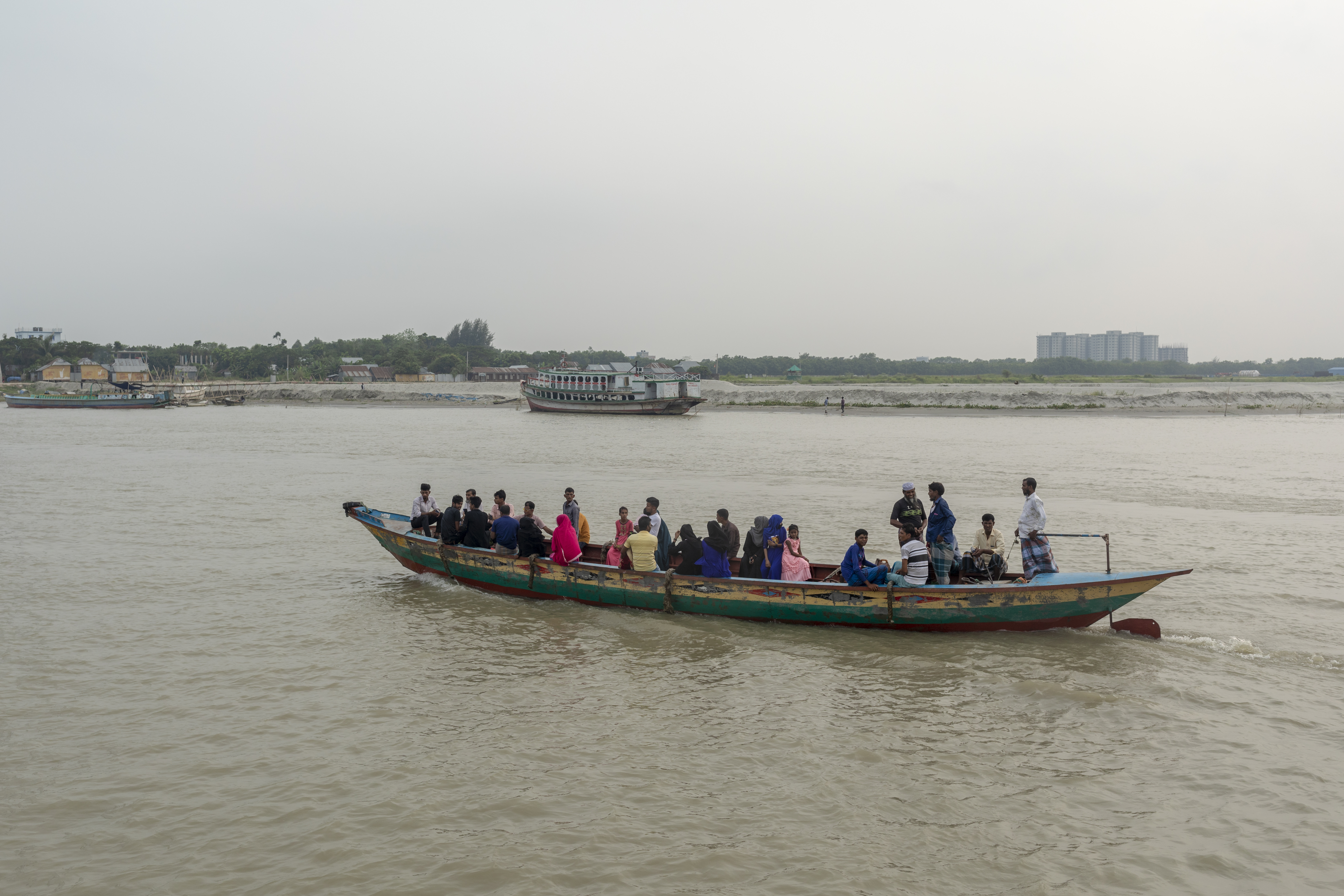
Engine Boat at Padma river

=== Geographic effects ===
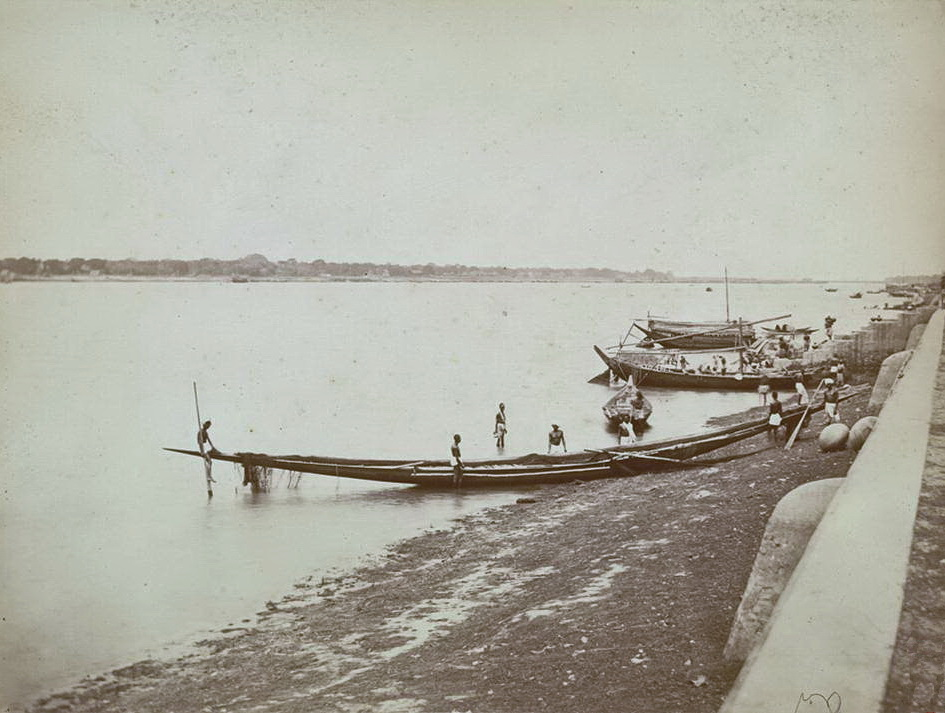
Padma River and boats (1860)

Eighteenth-century geographer James Rennell referred to a former course of the Ganges north of its present channel, as follows:

Appearances favour very strongly the opinion, that the Ganges had its former bed in the tract now occupied by the lakes and morasses between Nattore and Jaffiergunge, striking out of the present course at Bauleah ... to a junction with the Burrampooter or Megna near Fringybazar; where the accumulation of two such mighty streams probably scooped out the present amazing bed of the Megna.

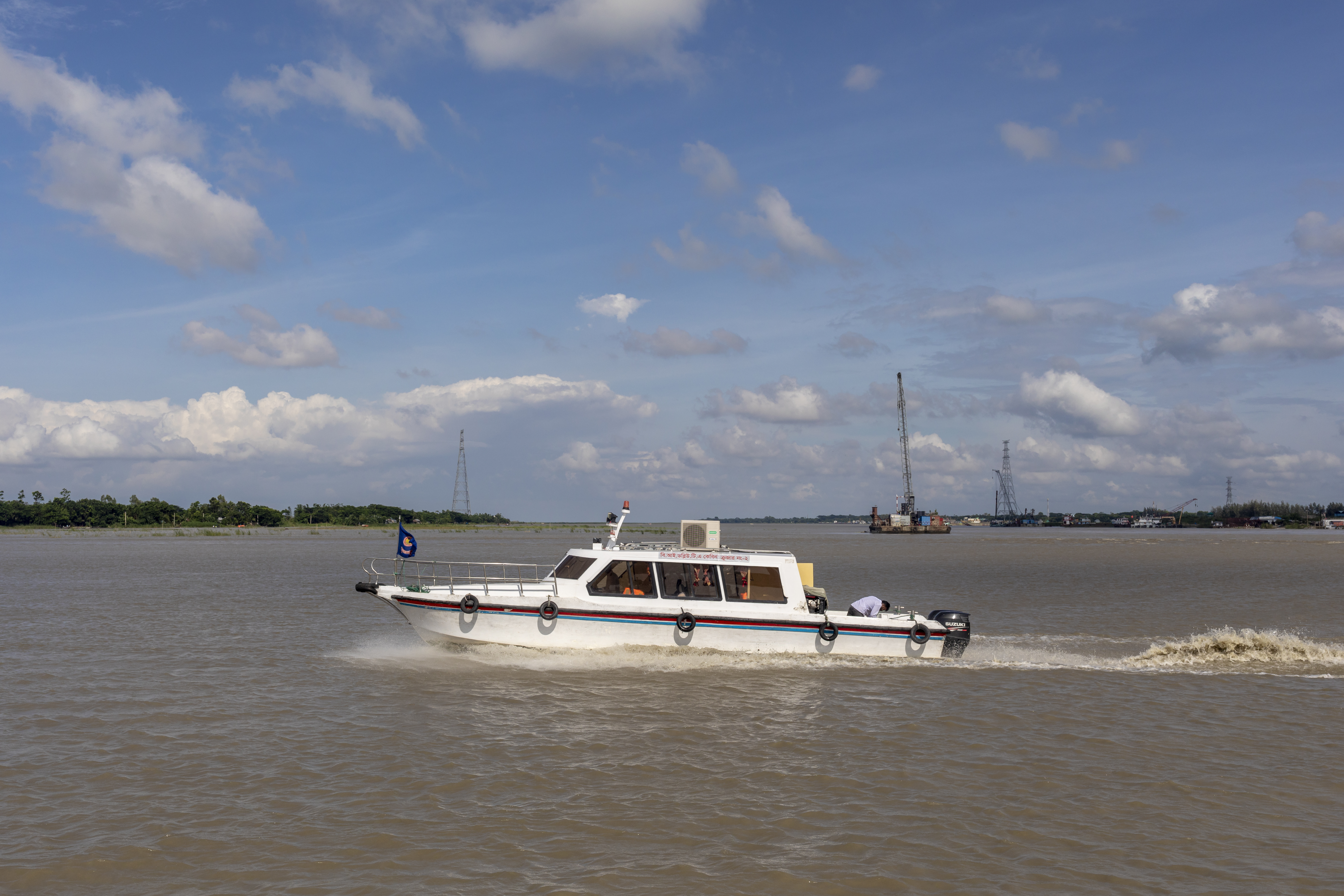
Speedboat at Padma River

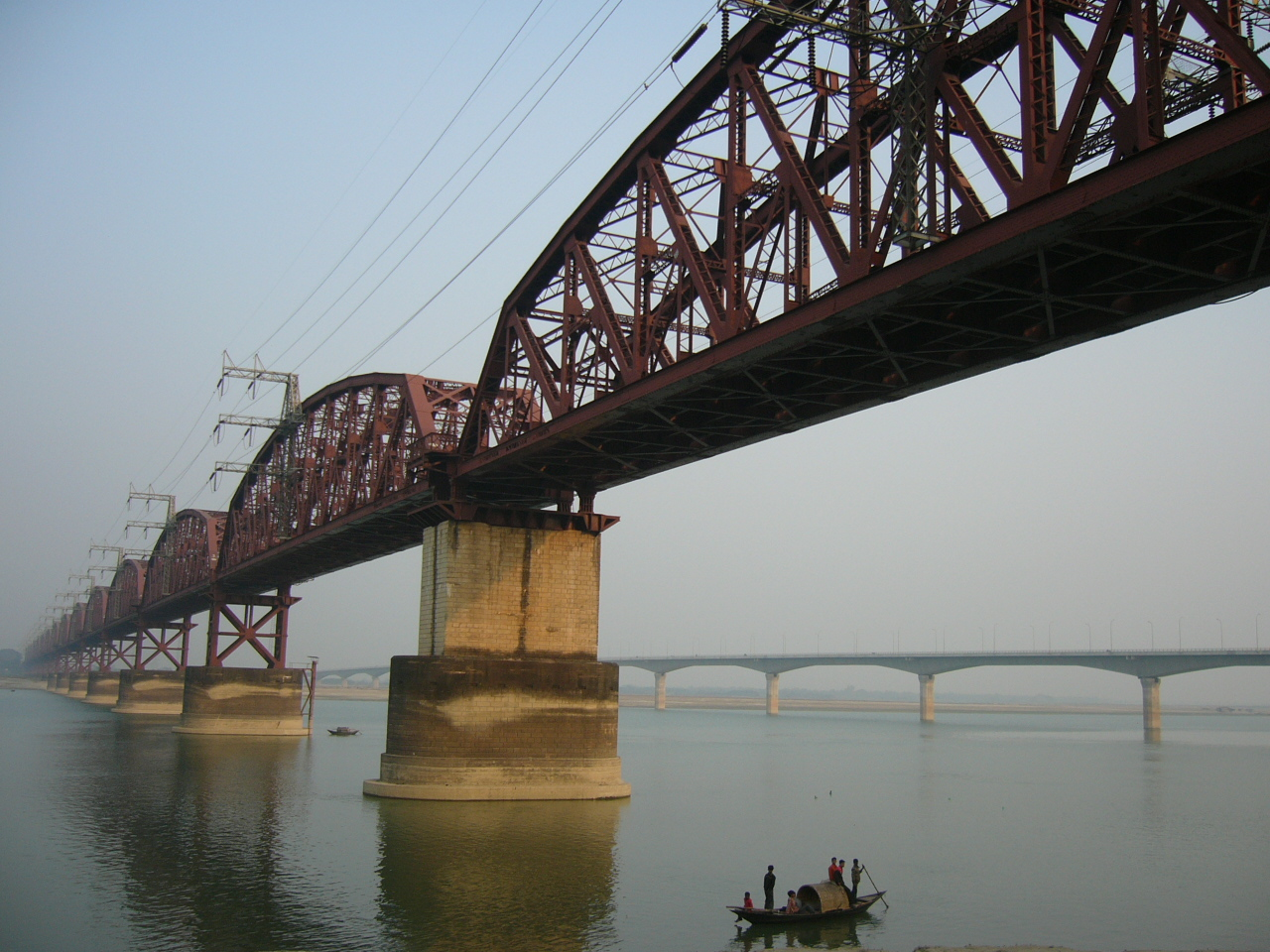
Hardinge Bridge in Bangladesh

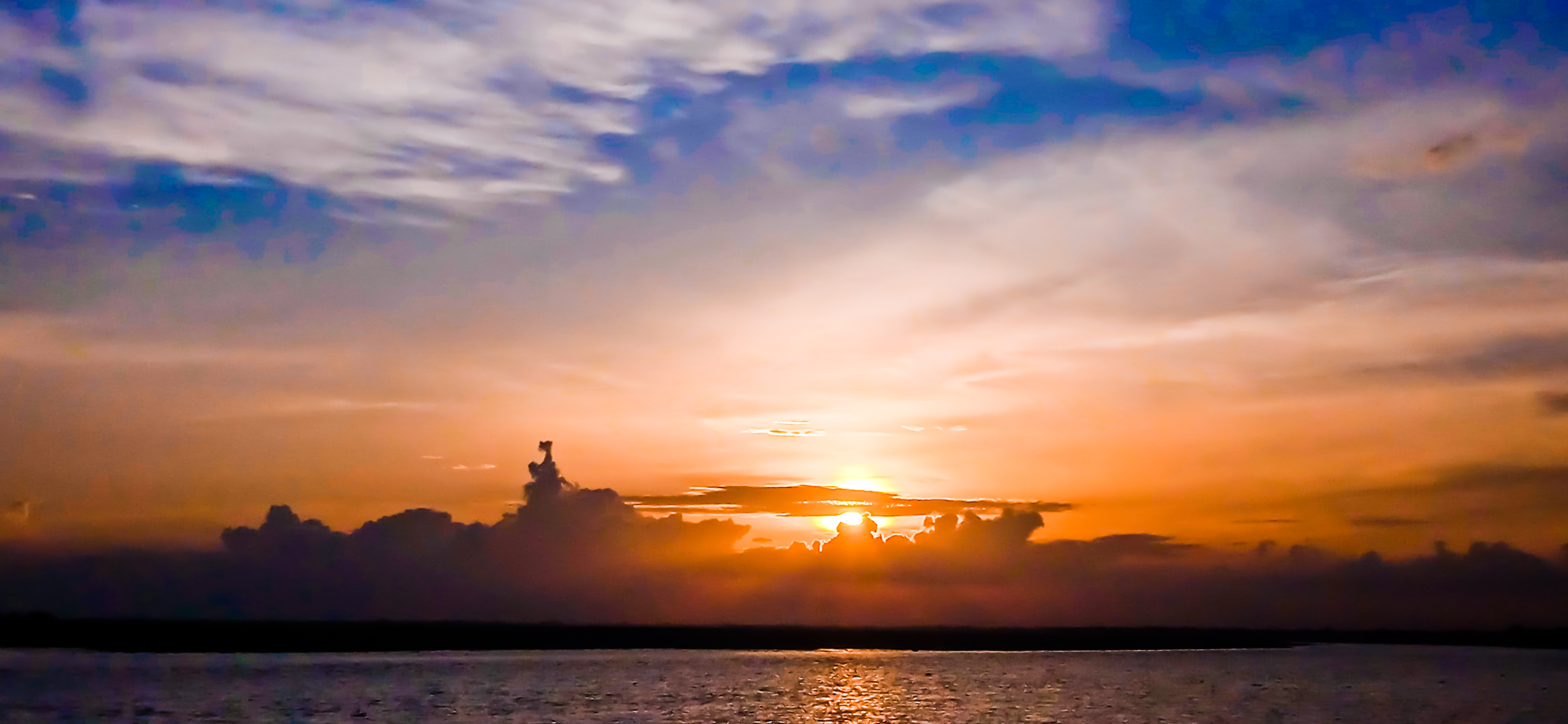
Sunset from Padma River

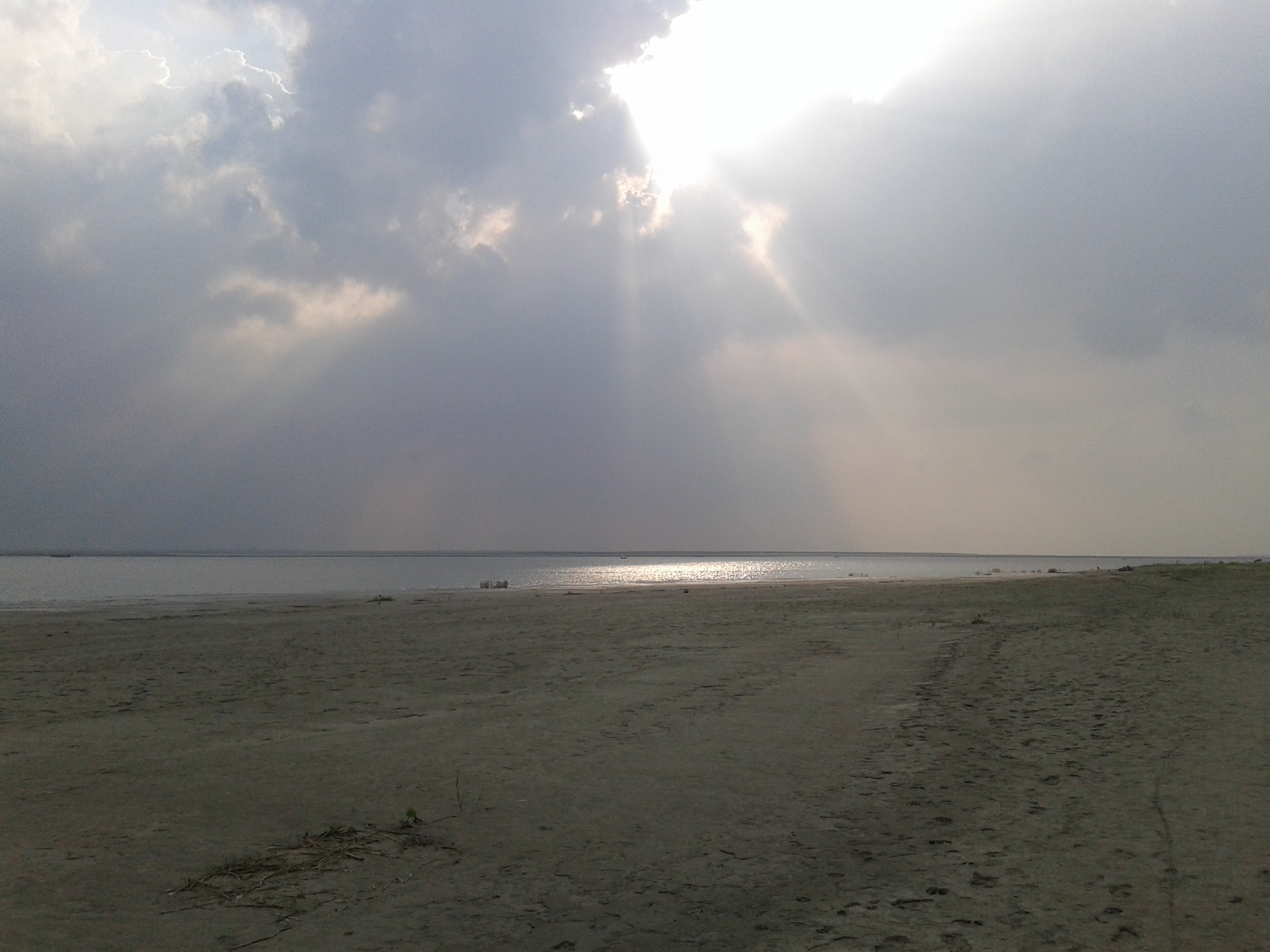
A view of Padma river in summer near Rajshahi

=== Murshidabad District ===
Murshidabad District is situated on the western bank of the Padma. It flows dividing the Rajshahi and Murshidabad District of West Bengal and created a natural river border between India and Bangladesh. The Jalangi area of the district was seriously affected by river bank erosion of the Padma.

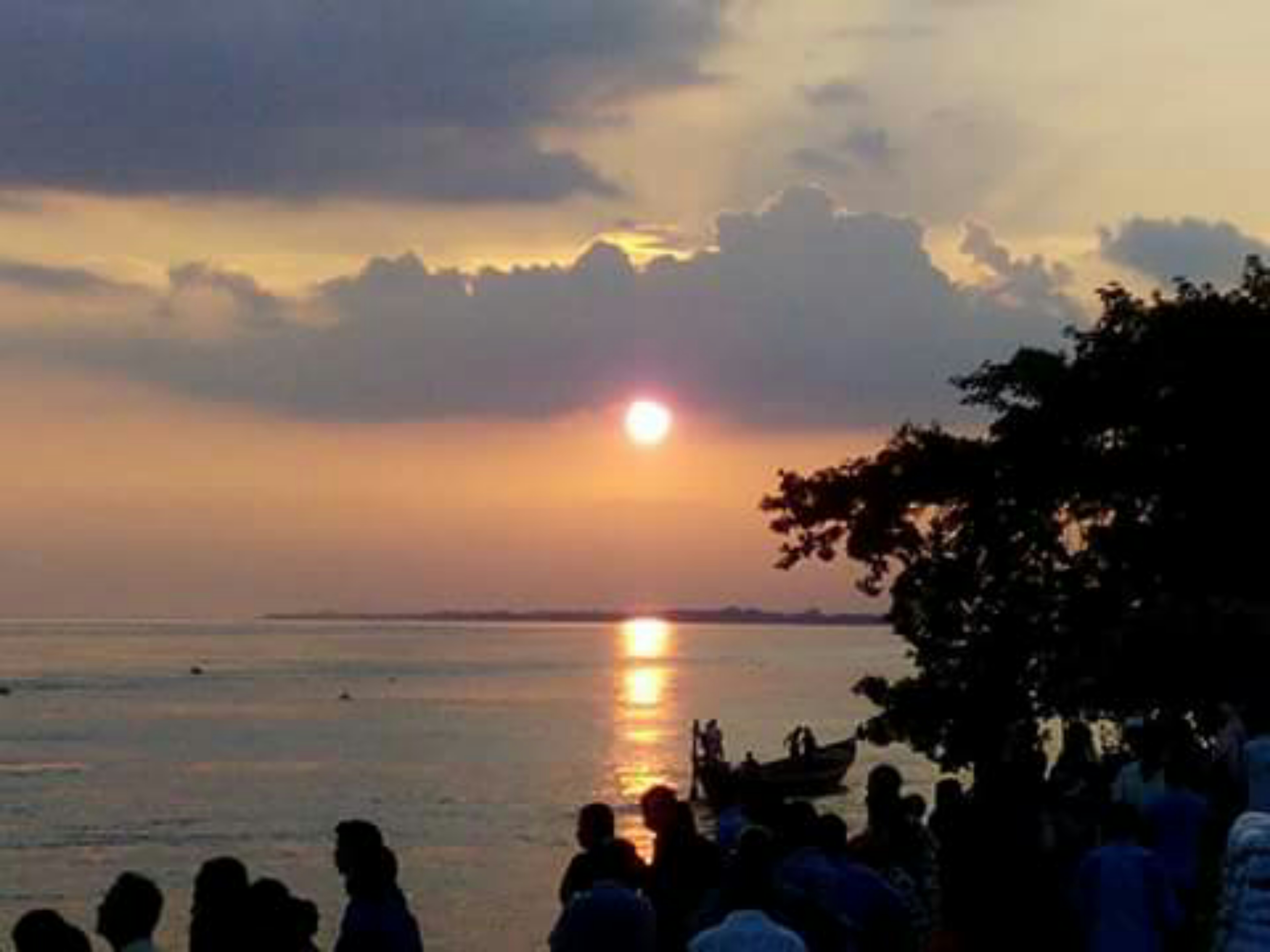
Sunset from the river Padma during monsoon, Rajpara, Rajshahi

== Infrastructure ==
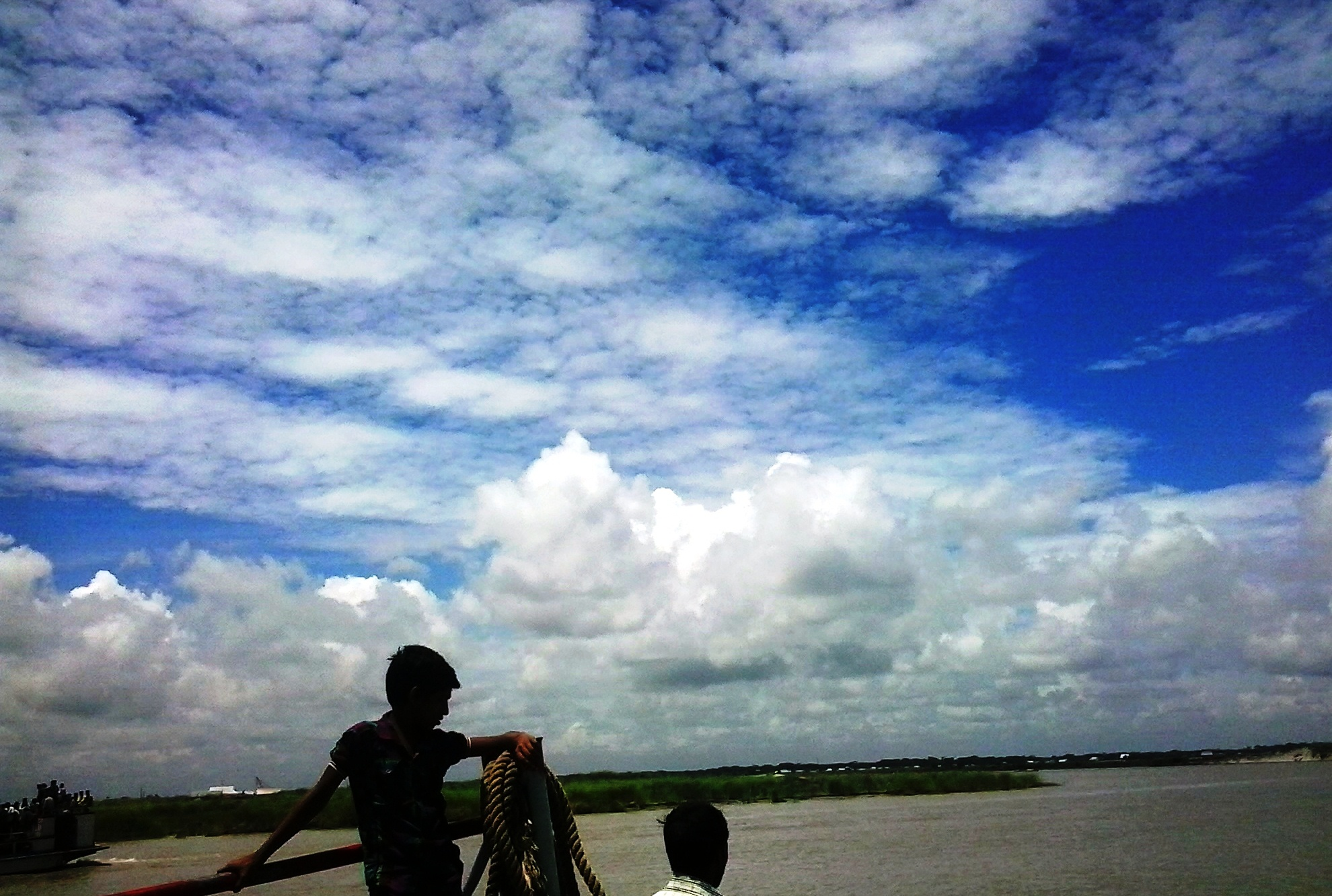
Sky over river padma

=== Damming ===
After the construction of the Farakka Barrage on the Ganges River in West Bengal, the maximum flows in the Padma River were reduced significantly. The flow reduction caused many problems in Bangladesh, including the loss of fish species, the drying of the Padma's distributaries, increased Saltwater intrusion from the Bay of Bengal, and damage to the mangrove forests of the Sundarbans.

=== Padma Bridge ===
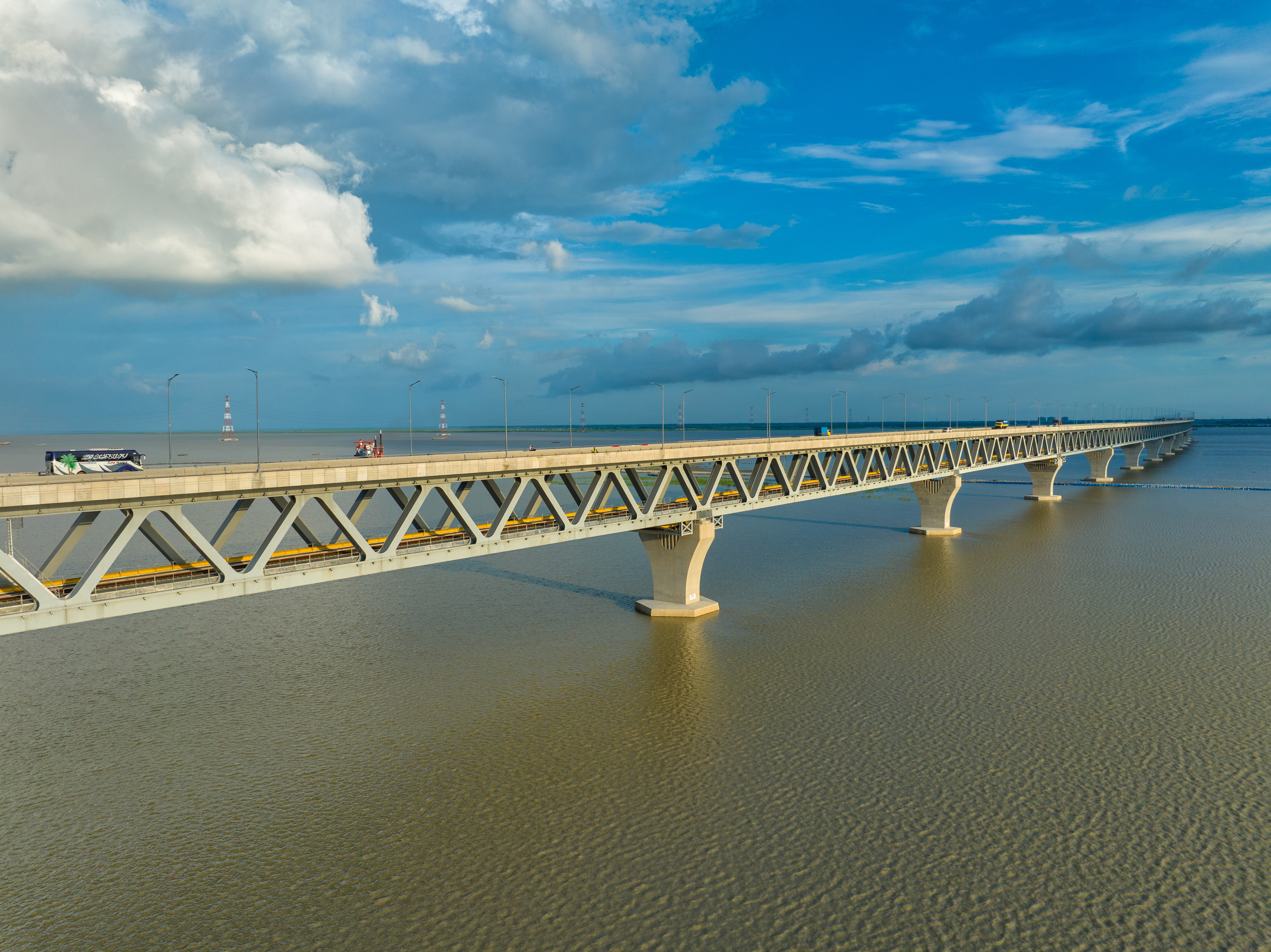

The Padma Bridge is Bangladesh's largest bridge and cost an estimated US$3 billion to complete. It was inaugurated on 25 June 2022. It was supposed to be open to the public in 2013, but the project's future became uncertain when, in June 2012, the World Bank cancelled its $1.2 billion loan over allegations of corruption. In June 2014, the Government of Bangladesh, proceeded without the loan and hired a Chinese firm to construct the 6.15-kilometre (3.82 mi) main part of the bridge. In October 2014, it hired a South Korean firm to supervise construction, with the aim of finishing the project by 2018. The final (41st) span of the bridge was installed on 10 December 2020. The last road slab was installed on the span that linked pillars 12 and 13 of the Padma bridge on 24 August 2021.

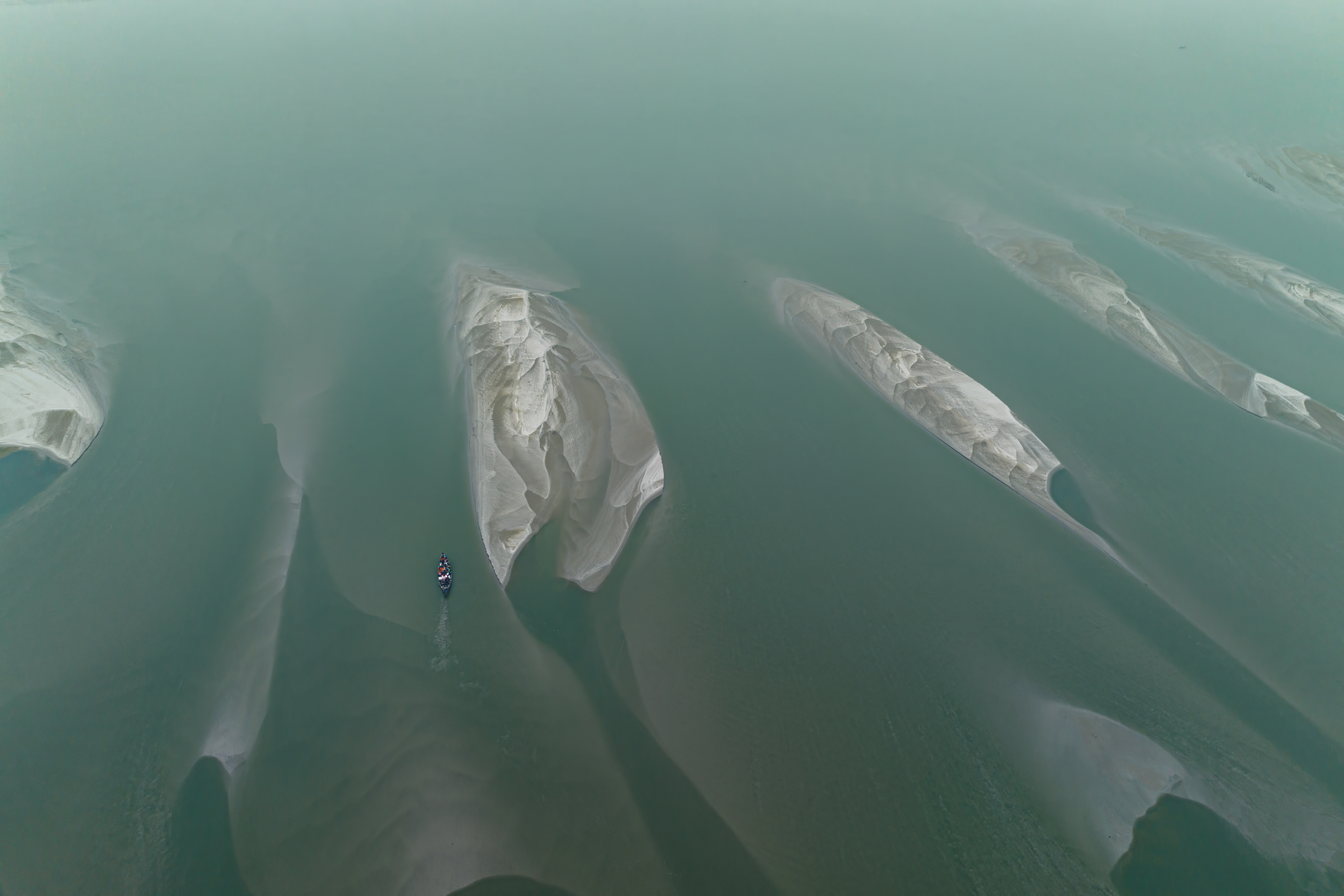
Effect of climate change of Padma river in 2024

In 2009, government plans also included rail lines on both sides of the Padma with a connection via the new bridge.

The Lalon Shah Bridge and Hardinge Bridge also crosses the Padma further upstream.

== See also ==
- Ganges Barrage Project
- Railway stations in Bangladesh
