= Kankuria =

Kankuria Kankuria more
- Census Town
- Location in West Bengal, India Kankuria (India)
- Coordinates: 24.65232°N 87.96043°E
- Country: India
- State: West Bengal
- District: Murshidabad
- Established: 15 August 1947

Government
  - Type: Rural area
  - Body: Gram Panchayat

Area
  - Total: 3.46 km^{2} (1.34 sq mi)

Population (2011)
  - Total: 36,925
  - Density: 10,700/km^{2} (27,600/sq mi)

Languages
  - Official: Bengali, English
- Time zone: UTC+5:30 (IST)
- PIN: 742202
- Vehicle registration: WB58, WB94
- Lok Sabha constituency: Maldaha Dakshin
- Vidhan Sabha constituency: Samserganj
- Website: murshidabad.nic.in

Kankuria is a census town in the Samserganj CD block, under the Dhulian Circle Area in the Jangipur subdivision of the Murshidabad district in the Indian state of West Bengal.

== Geography ==
Cities, towns and locations in the northern portion of Jangipur subdivision, Murshidabad district (including Farakka, Samserganj, Suti II CD blocks)
M: municipal town, CT: census town, R: rural/ urban centre, F: Facility
Abbreviation- TPS: Thermal Power Station
Owing to space constraints in the small map, the actual locations in a larger map may vary slightly

=== Location ===
Kankuria is located at 24.65232°N 87.96043°E.

According to the map of Samserganj CD block in the District Census Handbook, Murshidabad, Anup Nagar, Jafrabad, Kankuria, Kohetpur, Jaykrishnapur, Uttar Mahammadpur, Chachanda, Basudebpur and Dhusaripara form a series of census towns from Dhuliyan, a municipal town.

=== Area overview ===
Jangipur subdivision is crowded with 52 census towns and as such it had to be presented in two location maps. One of the maps can be seen alongside. The subdivision is located in the Rarh region that is spread over from adjoining Santhal Pargana division of Jharkhand. The land is slightly higher in altitude than the surrounding plains and is gently undulating. The river Ganges, along with its distributaries, is prominent in both the maps. At the head of the subdivision is the 2,245 m long Farakka Barrage, one of the largest projects of its kind in the country. Murshidabad district shares with Bangladesh a porous international border which is notoriously crime prone (partly shown in this map). The subdivision has two large power plants - the 2,100 MW Farakka Super Thermal Power Station and the 1,600 MW Sagardighi Thermal Power Station. According to a 2016 report, there are around 1,000,000 (1 million/ ten lakh) workers engaged in the beedi industry in Jangipur subdivision. 90% are home-based and 70% of the home-based workers are women. As of 2013, an estimated 2.4 million people reside along the banks of the Ganges alone in Murshidabad district. Severe erosion occurs along the banks.

Note: The two maps present some of the notable locations in the subdivision. All places marked in the maps are linked in the larger full screen maps.

== Demographics ==
According to the 2011 Census of India, Kankuria had a population of 36,925, of which 18,157 (49%) were males and 18,768 (51%) were females. Population in the age range 0–6 years was 7,430. The total number of literate persons in Kankuria was 15,640 (53.03% of the population over 6 years) that is lower than the state average of 76.26%. Male literacy is around 58.21% while female literacy rate is 48.03%.

As of 2001 India census, Kankuria had a population of 27,372. Males were 50% of the population and females 50%. The average literacy rate was 31%, lower than the national average of 59.5%; male literacy was 39%, and female literacy was 23%, and 23% of the population was under 6 years of age.

== Infrastructure ==
According to the District Census Handbook, Murshidabad, 2011, Kankuria covered an area of 3.46 km^{2}. It had 8 km roads. The protected water-supply involved service reservoir, hand pump. It had 600 domestic electric connections. Among the medical facilities it had 3 dispensaries/ health centres, 4 family welfare centres, 4 maternity & child welfare centre, 3 medicine shops. Among the educational facilities, it had 22 primary schools, 1 middle school, 1 secondary school, 1 senior secondary school, general degree college at Dak Bungalow 5 km away. It had 1 non-formal education centre (Sarva Shiksha Abhiyan). Among the social, cultural & recreational facilities it had 1 auditorium/ community hall, 1 public library. It produced beedi. It had the branch offices of 1 nationalised bank, 1 agricultural credit society.

== Education ==
College : Nur Mohammad Smriti Mohavidyalaya, affiliated to Kalyani University and located beside NH34 highway.

School: Saheb Nagar High School affiliated to West Bengal board of secondary education. Saheb Nagar High School (H.S).

== Economy ==
Biri industry (nicotine industry): Most of people involved in nicotine industry, especially women.

== Healthcare ==
Hospitals: Tarapur Hospital (government), Anup Nagar Hospital (government), DDH Hospital (private). These hospitals are in Dhulian.

Samserganj CD block is one of the areas of Murshidabad district where ground water is affected by a high level of arsenic contamination. The WHO guideline for arsenic in drinking water is 10 mg/ litre, and the Indian Standard value is 50 mg/ litre. The maximum concentration in Samserganj CD block is 287 mg/litre.
