= Chachanda =

- Census Town
- Location in West Bengal, India Chachanda (India)
- Coordinates: 24.6381°N 87.9814°E
- Country: India
- State: West Bengal
- District: Murshidabad

Area
  - Total: 1.15 km^{2} (0.44 sq mi)

Population (2011)
  - Total: 14,244
  - Density: 12,400/km^{2} (32,100/sq mi)

Languages
  - Official: Bengali, English
- Time zone: UTC+5:30 (IST)
- PIN: 742224
- Vehicle registration: WB
- Lok Sabha constituency: Maldaha Dakshin
- Vidhan Sabha constituency: Samserganj
- Website: murshidabad.nic.in

Chachanda is a census town in the Samserganj CD block in the Jangipur subdivision of the Murshidabad district in the state of West Bengal, India.

== Geography ==
Cities, towns and locations in the northern portion of Jangipur subdivision, Murshidabad district (including Farakka, Samserganj, Suti II CD blocks)
M: municipal town, CT: census town, R: rural/ urban centre, F: Facility
Abbreviation- TPS: Thermal Power Station
Owing to space constraints in the small map, the actual locations in a larger map may vary slightly

=== Location ===
Chachanda is located at 24.6381°N 87.9814°E.

According to the map of Samserganj CD block in the District Census Handbook, Murshidabad, Anup Nagar, Jafrabad, Kankuria, Kohetpur, Jaykrishnapur, Uttar Mahammadpur, Chachanda, Basudebpur and Dhusaripara form a series of census towns from Dhuliyan, a municipal town.

=== Area overview ===
Jangipur subdivision is crowded with 52 census towns and as such it had to be presented in two location maps. One of the maps can be seen alongside. The subdivision is located in the Rarh region that is spread over from adjoining Santhal Pargana division of Jharkhand. The land is slightly higher in altitude than the surrounding plains and is gently undulating. The river Ganges, along with its distributaries, is prominent in both the maps. At the head of the subdivision is the 2,245 m long Farakka Barrage, one of the largest projects of its kind in the country. Murshidabad district shares with Bangladesh a porous international border which is notoriously crime prone (partly shown in this map). The subdivision has two large power plants - the 2,100 MW Farakka Super Thermal Power Station and the 1,600 MW Sagardighi Thermal Power Station. According to a 2016 report, there are around 1,000,000 (1 million/ ten lakh) workers engaged in the beedi industry in Jangipur subdivision. 90% are home-based and 70% of the home-based workers are women. As of 2013, an estimated 2.4 million people reside along the banks of the Ganges alone in Murshidabad district. Severe erosion occurs along the banks.

Note: The two maps present some of the notable locations in the subdivision. All places marked in the maps are linked in the larger full screen maps.

== Demographics ==
According to the 2011 Census of India, Chachanda had a total population of 14,244, of which 7,194 (51%) were males and 7.050 (49%) were females. Population in the age range 0–6 years was 2,897. The total number of literate persons in Chachanda was 6,556 (57.78% of the population over 6 years).

As of 2001 India census, Chachanda had a population of 10,300. Males constitute 51% of the population and females 49%. Chachanda has an average literacy rate of 35%, lower than the national average of 59.5%; with male literacy of 44% and female literacy of 26%. 23% of the population is under 6 years of age.

== Infrastructure ==
According to the District Census Handbook, Murshidabad, 2011, Chachanda covered an area of 1.15 km^{2}. It had 2 km roads. The protected water-supply involved service reservoir, hand pump. It had 898 domestic electric connections. Among the educational facilities, it had 1 primary school, 1 senior secondary school in town, general degree college at Dak Bungalow 10 km away. It produced beedi, handloom products, molasses. It had the branch office of 1 agricultural credit society.

== Transport ==
Chachanda is well connected by road and rail. National Highway 12 34 and Azimganj-Barharwa railway line pass by Chachanda. It is 75 km away from district town Berhampore and 275 km from Kolkata. Nearest market is Basudevpur. Basudevpur is a best market in this division for vegetables and fruit. Nearest Railway station is Basudevpur Halt.

== Education ==
There are three educational institutions in Chachanda, one High School (C.B.J.High School), one Primary School and one Primary Madrasa. The high school was initially for classes V to X, but now it's been upgraded to class XII (Arts & Science). It not only serves the educational need of Chachanda but many other adjoining areas also.

== Healthcare ==
Samserganj CD block is one of the areas of Murshidabad district where ground water is affected by a high level of arsenic contamination. The WHO guideline for arsenic in drinking water is 10 mg/ litre, and the Indian Standard value is 50 mg/ litre. The maximum concentration in Samserganj CD block is 287 mg/litre.
