= Samserganj (community development block) =

- Community development block
- Interactive map of Samserganj
- Coordinates: 24.6505°N 87.9701°E
- Country: India
- State: West Bengal
- District: Murshidabad

Government
  - Type: Federal democracy

Area
  - Total: 92.69 km^{2} (35.79 sq mi)
- Elevation: 26 m (85 ft)

Population (2011)
  - Total: 284,072
  - Density: 3,065/km^{2} (7,938/sq mi)

Languages
  - Official: Bengali, English

Literacy
  - Literacy(2011): 54.98%
- Time zone: UTC+5:30 (IST)
- PIN: 742224 (Nimtita); 742202 (Dhuliyan)
- Telephone/STD code: 03485
- ISO 3166 code: IN-WB
- Vehicle registration: WB-57, WB-58
- Lok Sabha constituency: Maldaha Dakshin
- Vidhan Sabha constituency: Samserganj, Farakka
- Website: murshidbad.nic.in

Samserganj is a community development block that forms an administrative division in the Jangipur subdivision of Murshidabad district in the Indian state of West Bengal.

== Geography ==
Nimtita, a constituent panchayat of Samserganj block, is located at 24°39′02″N 87°58′12″E

Samserganj CD block is bounded by Farakka CD block in the north, Kaliachak III CD block, across the Ganges in Malda district, and Chapai Nawabganj Sadar Upazila in Chapai Nawabganj District of Bangladesh, across the Ganges, in the east, Suti II CD block in the south and Pakur and Maheshpur CD blocks, in Pakur district of Jharkhand, in the west.

Murshidabad district has a 125.35 km long international border with Bangladesh of which 42.35 km is on land and the remaining is riverine. There are 9 blocks – Samserganj, Suti I, Suti II, Raghunathganj II, Lalgola, Bhagawangola I, Bhagawangola II, Raninagar II and Jalangi - along the Bangladesh-India border.

Samserganj CD block lies in the Rarh region in Murshidabad district. The Bhagirathi River splits the district into two natural physiographic regions – Rarh on the west and Bagri on the east. The Padma River separates Murshidabad district from Malda district and Chapai Nawabganj and Rajshahi districts of Bangladesh in the north. The Rarh region is undulating and contains mostly clay and lateritic clay based soil. As the Rajmahal hills slopes gently down from adjoining Jharkhand it forms the Nabagram plain at the lowest edge of its elevation in this region. The eastern slope of the region is characterised by the existence of numerous cliffs and bluffs.

The Rarh region or the western part of the district is drained by the right bank tributaries of the Bhagirathi, flowing down from the hilly / plateau region of Santhal Pargana division in neighbouring Jharkhand. The Farakka Barrage regulates the flow of water into the Bhagirathi through the feeder canal. Thereafter, it is fed with the discharge from the Mayurakshi system. About 1,800 km^{2} of area in the neighbourhood of Kandi town is flooded by the combined discharge of the Mayurakshi, Dwarka, Brahmani, Gambhira, Kopai and Bakreshwar – the main contributor being the Mayurakshi. Certain other areas in the western sector also get flooded.

The 38.38 km long feeder canal takes off upstream of the Farakka Barrage and links with the Bhagirathi River. The feeder canal was constructed across the flow of the small flashy rivers such as Gumani, Trimohini and Kanloi. The discharges of the Trimohini and Kanloi were designed to flow into the feeder canal, and whenever the discharges of these rivers exceed the design capacity, they cause problems. The discharge of the Bagmari was designed to flow into the Ganga along its course through a siphone across the feeder canal. With the choking of the outlet to the Ganges, the flood discharge spills over to the basins of the Pagla and the Bansloi and floods around 100 km^{2}

A major problem in Murshidabad district is river bank erosion. As of 2013, an estimated 2.4 million people reside along the banks of the Ganges alone in Murshidabad district. Between 1931 and 1977, 26,769 hectares have been eroded and many villages have been fully submerged. 1980-1990 was a decade of erosion for this district and during the decade Giria, Sekhalipur, Khejustala, Mithipur, Fajilpur, Rajapur, Akheriganj, Parashpur villages were badly affected.

See also - River bank erosion along the Ganges in Malda and Murshidabad districts

Samserganj CD block has an area of 84.21 km^{2}. It has 1 panchayat samity, 9 gram panchayats, 154 gram sansads (village councils), 38 mouzas and 24 inhabited villages. Samserganj police station serves this block. Headquarters of this CD block is at Dhulian.

Gram panchayats in Samserganj block/ panchayat samiti are: Bhasaipaiker, Bogdadnagar, Chachanda, Dogachhinapara, Gazinagar Malancha, Kanchantala, Nimtita, Pratapganj and Tinpakuria.

== Demographics ==
=== Population ===
According to the 2011 Census of India Samserganj CD block had a total population of 284,072, of which 108,718 were rural and 175,354 were urban. There were 142,034 (50%) males and 142,038 (50%) females. Population in the age range 0-6 years was 58,190. Scheduled Castes numbered 18,399 (6.48%) and Scheduled Tribes numbered 164 (0.06%).

Ratanpur, the block headquarters had a population of 1,482 in 2011.

As per 2001 census, Samserganj block has a total population of 211,561, out of which 106,427 were males and 105,134 were females. Samserganj block registered a population growth of 17.33 per cent during the 1991-2001 decade. Decadal growth for the district was 23.70 per cent. Decadal growth in West Bengal was 17.84 per cent.

Decadal Population Growth Rate (%)

- Samserganj CD block
- Murshidabad district
- West Bengal

The decadal growth of population in Samserganj CD block in 2001-2011 was 34.09%.

The decadal growth rate of population in Murshidabad district was as follows: 33.5% in 1951–61, 28.6% in 1961–71, 25.5% in 1971–81, 28.2% in 1981-91, 23.8% in 1991-2001 and 21.1% in 2001-11. The decadal growth rate for West Bengal in 2001-11 was 13.93%.

The decadal growth rate of population in neighbouring Chapai Nawabganj District in Bangladesh was 15.59% for the decade 2001–2011, down from 21.67% in the decade 1991-2001.

There are reports of Bangladeshi infiltrators entering Murshidabad district.

=== Census towns and villages ===
Census towns in Samserganj CD block were (2011 figures in brackets): Anup Nagar (12,940), Jafrabad (28,332), Kankuria (36,925), Uttar Mahammadpur (8,264), Chachanda (14,244), Dhusaripara (17,800), Serpur (8,900), Kohetpur (5,379), Bhasaipaikar (23,141), Jaykrishnapur (12,599) and Basudebpur (6,830).

Large villages in Samserganj CD block were (2011 figures in brackets): Malancha (16,918), Antardwipa (10,605), Adwaita Nagar (6,176), Umarpur (5,785), Dogachhi (13,848), Laskarpur (6,756), Balbalpara (5,207), Chandni Daha (5,996), Hasimpur (6,539) and Durgapur (4,169).

Other villages in Samserganj CD block included (2011 population in brackets): Nimtita (2,068) and Ratanpur (1,482).

=== Literacy ===
As per the 2011 census, the total number of literate persons in Samserganj CD block was 124,196 (54.98% of the population over 6 years) out of which males numbered 68,042 (60.42% of the male population over 6 years) and females numbered 56,154 (49.57% of the female population over 6 years). The gender disparity (the difference between female and male literacy rates) was 10.85%.

See also – List of West Bengal districts ranked by literacy rate

Literacy in CD blocks of
Murshidabad district
Jangipur subdivision
Farakka – 59.75%
Samserganj – 54.98%
Suti I – 58.40%
Suti II – 55.23%
Raghunathganj I – 64.49%
Raghunathganj II – 61.17%
Sagardighi – 65.27%
Lalbag subdivision
Murshidabad-Jiaganj – 69.14%
Bhagawangola I - 57.22%
Bhagawangola II – 53.48%
Lalgola– 64.32%
Nabagram – 70.83%
Sadar subdivision
Berhampore – 73.51%
Beldanga I – 70.06%
Beldanga II – 67.86%
Hariharpara – 69.20%
Naoda – 66.09%
Kandi subdivision
Kandi – 65.13%
Khargram – 63.56%
Burwan – 68.96%
Bharatpur I – 62.93%
Bharatpur II – 66.07%
Domkol subdivision
Domkal – 55.89%
Raninagar I – 57.81%
Raninagar II – 54.81%
Jalangi – 58.73%
Source: 2011 Census: CD Block Wise
Primary Census Abstract Data

=== Language and religion ===
Religion in Samserganj CD block (2011)
Islam	83.48%
Hinduism	16.38%
Other or not stated	0.14%

In the 2011 census, Muslims numbered 237,152 and formed 83.48% of the population in Samserganj CD block. Hindus numbered 46,522 and formed 16.38% of the population. Others numbered 398 and formed 0.14% of the population. While the proportion of Muslims increased from 80.61% in 1991 to 81.22% in 2001, the proportion of Hindus declined from 19.39% in 1991 to 18.69% in 2001.

Murshidabad district had 4,707,573 Muslims who formed 66.27% of the population, 2,359,061 Hindus who formed 33.21% of the population, and 37, 173 persons belonging to other religions who formed 0.52% of the population, in the 2011 census. While the proportion of Muslim population in the district increased from 61.40% in 1991 to 63.67% in 2001, the proportion of Hindu population declined from 38.39% in 1991 to 35.92% in 2001.

Bengali is the predominant language, spoken by 99.89% of the population.

== Rural poverty ==
As per the Human Development Report 2004 for West Bengal, the rural poverty ratio in Murshidabad district was 46.12%. Purulia, Bankura and Birbhum districts had higher rural poverty ratios. These estimates were based on Central Sample data of NSS 55th round 1999-2000.

== Economy ==
=== Livelihood ===
Livelihood
in Samserganj CD block
1. Cultivators (2.61%)
2. Agricultural labourers (9.97%)
3. Household industries (65.3%)
4. Other Workers (22.1%)

In Samserganj CD block in 2011, amongst the class of total workers, cultivators numbered 3,197 and formed 2.61%, agricultural labourers numbered 12,209 and formed 9.97%, household industry workers numbered 80,000 and formed 65.31% and other workers numbered 27,085 and formed 22.11%.

=== Infrastructure ===
There are 24 inhabited villages in Samserganj CD block. 100% villages have power supply and drinking water supply. 6 villages (25.00%) have post offices. 22 villages (91.67%) have telephones (including landlines, public call offices and mobile phones). 10 villages (41.67%) have a pucca approach road and 9 villages (37.50%) have transport communication (includes bus service, rail facility and navigable waterways). 2 villages (8.33%) have agricultural credit societies and 3 villages (12.50%) have banks.

=== Agriculture ===
From 1977 onwards major land reforms took place in West Bengal. Land in excess of land ceiling was acquired and distributed amongst the peasants. Following land reforms land ownership pattern has undergone transformation. In 2013–14, persons engaged in agriculture in Samserganj CD block could be classified as follows: bargadars 217 (0.92%,) patta (document) holders 1,752 (7.44%), small farmers (possessing land between 1 and 2 hectares) 1,775 (7.54%), marginal farmers (possessing land up to 1 hectare) 7,583 (32.22%) and agricultural labourers 12,209 (51.87%).

Samserganj CD block had 18 fertiliser depots and 42 fair price shops in 2013-14.

In 2013–14, Samserganj CD block produced 346 tonnes of Aman paddy, the main winter crop from 210 hectares, 221 tonnes of wheat from 111 hectares, 145 tonnes of maize from 56 hectares, 25,898 tonnes of jute from 1,584 hectares, 2,424 tonnes of potatoes from 85 hectares and 25,001 tonnes of sugar cane from 245 hectares. It also produced pulses and oilseeds.

In 2013–14, the total area irrigated in Samserganj CD block was 1,121 hectares, out of which 100 hectares were irrigated with tank water, 121 hectares with deep tube wells and 900 hectares by other means.

=== Beedi industry ===
As of 2003, around 400,000 workers were engaged in the prime area locations of beedi making, a household industry, in Farakka, Samserganj, Suti I, Suti II, Raghunathganj I and Raghunathganj II CD blocks. The majority of those working are women and children. Almost all households are engaged in this activity.

See also – Beedi Workers of Murshidabad (in Hindi). Lok Sabha TV feature

=== Silk and handicrafts ===
Murshidabad is famous for its silk industry since the Middle Ages. There are three distinct categories in this industry, namely (i) Mulberry cultivation and silkworm rearing (ii) Peeling of raw silk (iii) Weaving of silk fabrics.

Ivory carving is an important cottage industry from the era of the Nawabs. The main areas where this industry has flourished are Khagra and Jiaganj. 99% of ivory craft production is exported. In more recent years sandalwood etching has become more popular than ivory carving. Bell metal and Brass utensils are manufactured in large quantities at Khagra, Berhampore, Kandi and Jangipur.

=== Banking ===
In 2013–14, Samserganj CD block had offices of 7 commercial banks and 2 gramin banks.

=== Backward Regions Grant Fund ===
Murshidabad district is listed as a backward region and receives financial support from the Backward Regions Grant Fund. The fund, created by the Government of India, is designed to redress regional imbalances in development. As of 2012, 272 districts across the country were listed under this scheme. The list includes 11 districts of West Bengal.

== Transport ==
Samserganj CD block has 3 ferry services and 6 originating/ terminating bus routes.

The Barharwa-Azimganj-Katwa loop line passes through this block and there are stations at Sankopara, Dhuliyan Ganga, Basudebpur and Nimtita.

National Highway 12 (old number NH 34) passes through this block.

== Education ==
In 2013–14, Samserganj CD block had 85 primary schools with 23,003 students, 13 middle schools with 4,133 students, 2 high school with 4,025 students and 9 higher secondary schools with 28,907 students. Samserganj CD Block had 1 general college with 2,603 students and 391 institutions special and non-formal education with 15,450 students.

In Samserganj CD block, amongst the 24 inhabited villages, all villages have a school, 19 villages have more than 1 primary school, 13 villages have at least 1 primary and 1 middle school and 8 villages had at least 1 middle and 1 secondary school.

== Culture ==
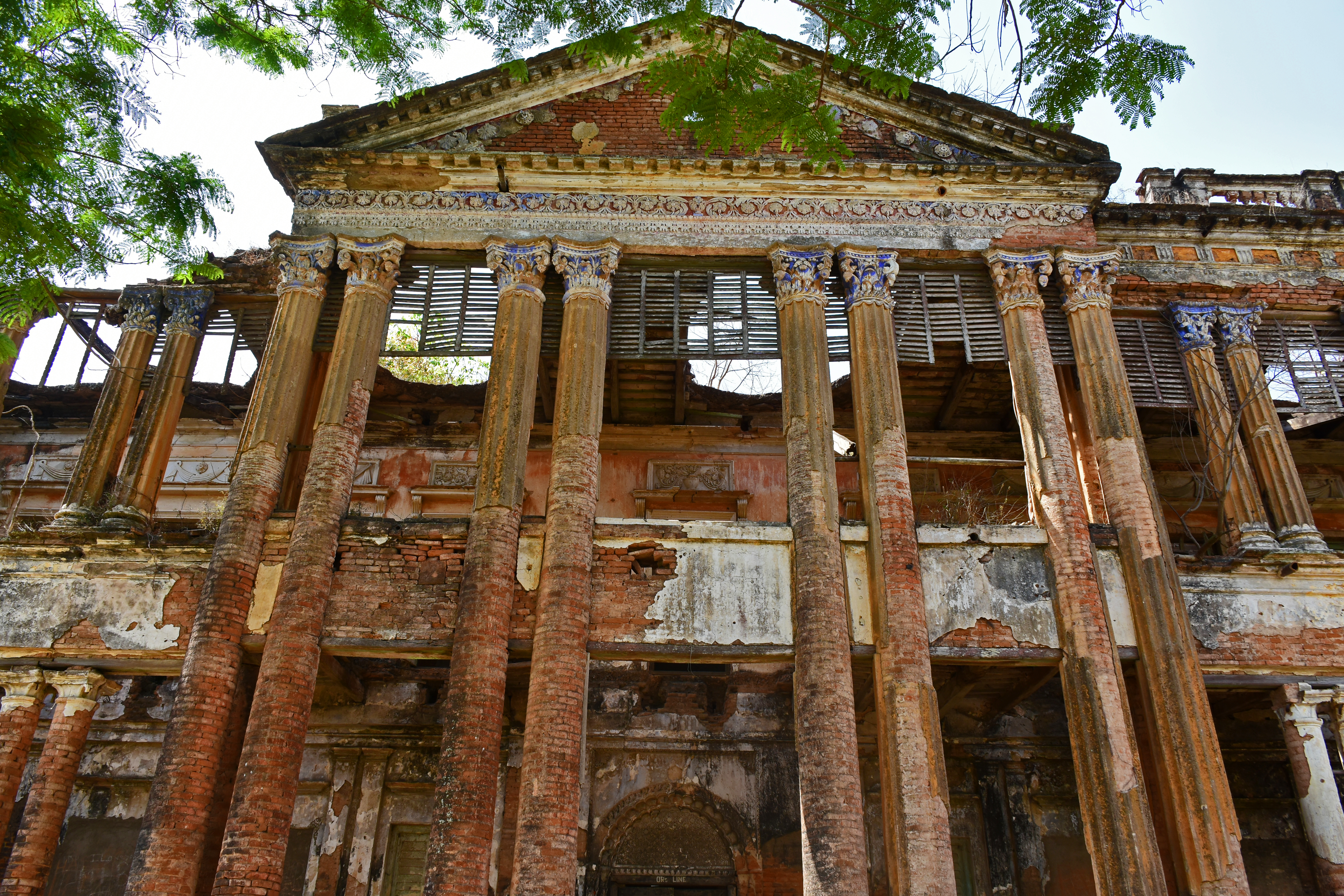
Ruined front facade of Nimtita Rajbari

Nimtita: Nimtita Rajbari, on the bank of the Ganges, is now a dilapidated structure, a testimony of a glorious past. Satyajit Ray shot one of his great films, Jalsaghar, at Nimtita Rajbari in 1957, and then followed it up with the shooting of Devi in 1960 and Samapti in 1961.

== Healthcare ==
In 2014, Samserganj CD block had 2 primary health centres, 1 central PSU medical centre and 2 private nursing homes with total 20 beds and 1 doctor (excluding private bodies). It had 33 family welfare subcentres. 64,722 patients were treated outdoor in the hospitals, health centres and subcentres of the CD Block.

Samserganj CD block has Central Hospital for Beedi Workers at Tarapur, PO Malancha, (with 50 beds), Anupnagar Rural Hospital at Dhulian (with 30 beds), Putimari Primary Health Centre (with 2 beds) and Uttar Mahammadpur PHC (with 10 beds).

Samserganj CD block is one of the areas of Murshidabad district where ground water is affected by a high level of arsenic contamination. The WHO guideline for arsenic in drinking water is 10 mg/ litre, and the Indian Standard value is 50 mg/ litre. All but one of the 26 blocks of Murshidabad district have arsenic contamination above the WHO level, all but two of the blocks have arsenic concentration above the Indian Standard value and 17 blocks have arsenic concentration above 300 mg/litre. The maximum concentration in Samserganj CD block is 287 mg/litre.
