= Padhuan =

- Village
- Interactive map of Padhuan
- Coordinates: 21.20942°N 86.78930°E
- Country: India
- State: Odisha
- District: Bhadrak

Population (2011)
  - Total: 6,945

Languages
  - Official: Odia
- Time zone: UTC+5:30 (IST)
- PIN: 756125

Padhuan is a village located in Basudebpur tehsil, Bhadrak district in the state of Odisha, India.

In 2011, the population was 6,945 people with 3,423 males and 3,522 females.
