= SXP =

SXP may refer to:

- SXP, the IATA and FAA LID code for Sheldon Point Airport, Alaska, United States
- SXP, the Indian Railways station code for Sankopara railway station, West Bengal, India
