= Mohammad Noor Alam =

Indian politician (born 1983)

Member of the West Bengal Legislative Assembly
- Incumbent
- Assumed office 2026
- Preceded by: Amirul Islam
- Constituency: Samserganj

Personal details
- Born: 1983 (age 42–43)
- Party: All India Trinamool Congress (until 2026); Democratic Trinamool Congress (from 2026)
- Profession: Politician

Mohammad Noor Alam (born 1983) is an Indian politician from West Bengal. He is a member of the West Bengal Legislative Assembly from Samserganj representing the Democratic Trinamool Congress.

== Early life and education ==
Noor Alam is the son of Layek Ali. He is engaged in business activities and is also associated with farming, industrial activities and contract work. He completed Higher Secondary education under the West Bengal Council of Higher Secondary Education in July 2001. His spouse is a businesswoman.

== Political career ==
Noor Alam won the Samserganj seat in the 2026 West Bengal Legislative Assembly election as a candidate of the All India Trinamool Congress. He received 61,918 votes and defeated Nazme Alam of the Indian National Congress by a margin of 7,587 votes.
