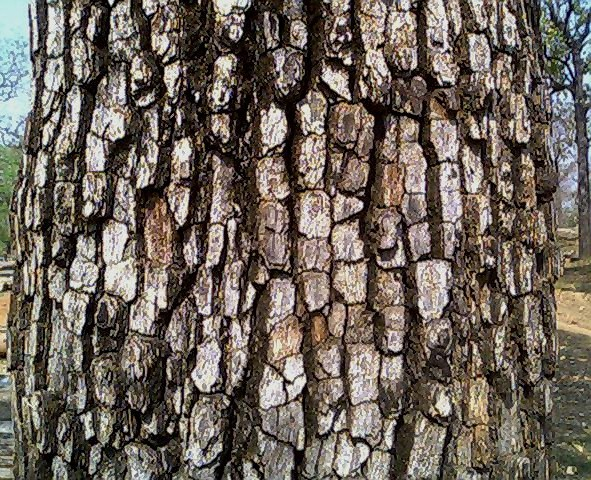
- Bark of the Coromandel ebony

Scientific classification
- Kingdom: Plantae
- Clade: Embryophytes
- Clade: Tracheophytes
- Clade: Spermatophytes
- Clade: Angiosperms
- Clade: Eudicots
- Clade: Asterids
- Order: Ericales
- Family: Ebenaceae
- Genus: Diospyros
- Species: D. melanoxylon

Binomial name
- Diospyros melanoxylon Roxb.

Synonyms
- Diospyros dubia Wall. ex A.DC.; Diospyros exsculpta Bedd.; Diospyros exsculpta Dalzell & Gibson; Diospyros montana B.Heyne ex A.DC.; Diospyros roylei Wall. ex A.DC.; Diospyros rubiginosa Roth; Diospyros tupru Buch.-Ham.; Diospyros wightiana Wall. nom. inval.

= Diospyros melanoxylon =

Coromandel ebony

Species of tree

Diospyros melanoxylon, the Coromandel ebony or East Indian ebony, is a species of flowering tree in the family Ebenaceae native to India and Sri Lanka; it has a hard, dry bark. Its common name derives from Coromandel, the coast of southeastern India. Locally it is known as temburini or by its Hindi name tendu. In Odisha, Jharkhand, and Assam, it is known as kendu. In Andhra Pradesh, and Telangana it is known as tuniki. The leaves can be wrapped around tobacco to create the Indian beedi, which has outsold conventional cigarettes in India.

== Description ==
D. melanoxylon is a shrub to medium-sized tree, growing up to 25 meters tall. It has alternate or opposite leaves, which grow up to 35 cm long.

It has mauve-colored flowers at least 1-1.5 cm in size. It is dioecious. The fruit of the tree is olive-green outside and yellow inside, and about 3–4 cm in diameter. They are edible, by both humans and wildlife, particularly fruit bats and hornbills.

The tree may be dry-season deciduous in a dry location, or evergreen in a moister habitat. Younger trees are shade-tolerant, but mature trees require full sun. D. melanoxylon prefers slightly acidic soils in the 5.5 - 7 pH range.

== Pharmacology ==
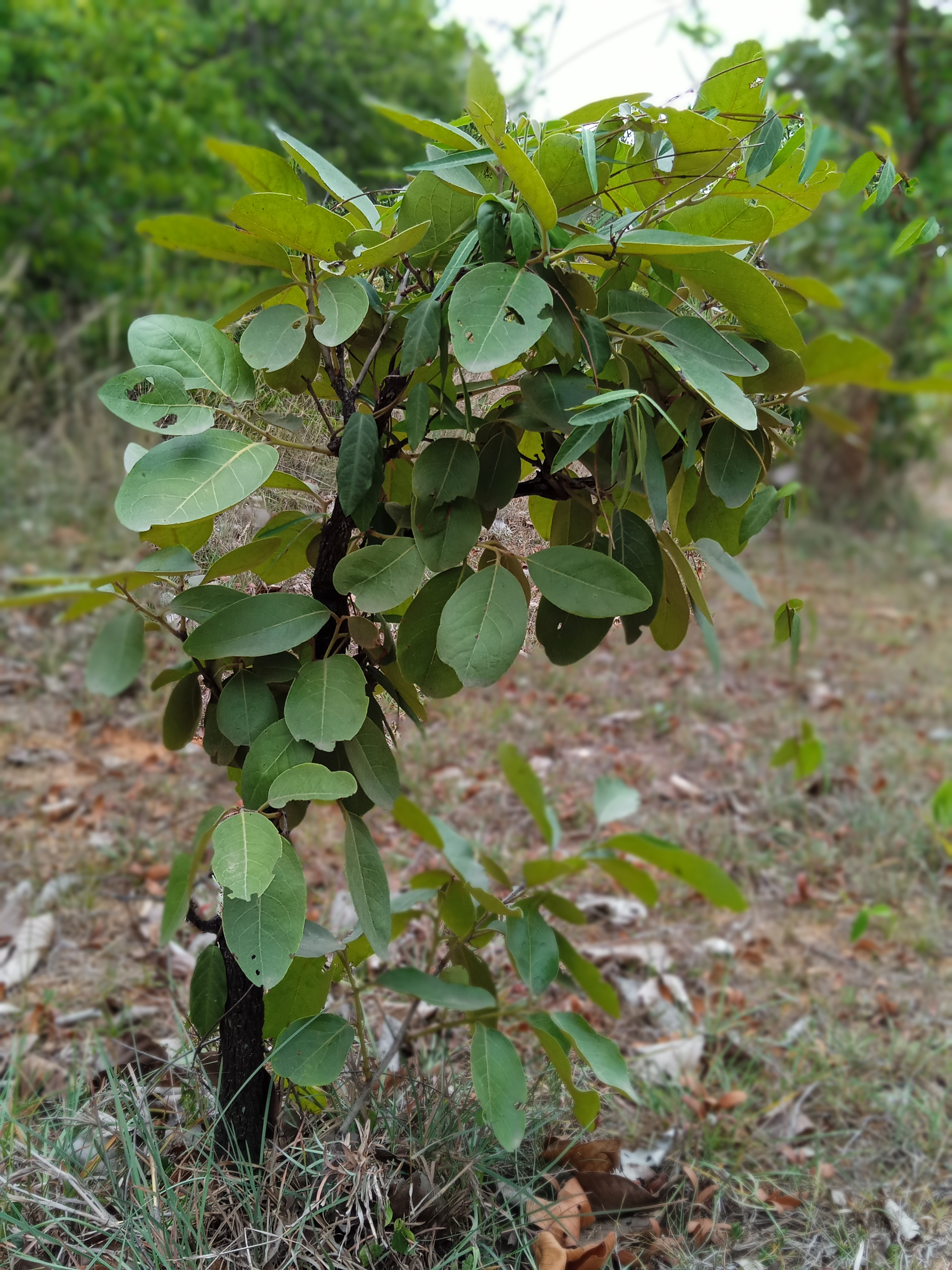
Little Tendu Tree of Purulia, West Bengal, India

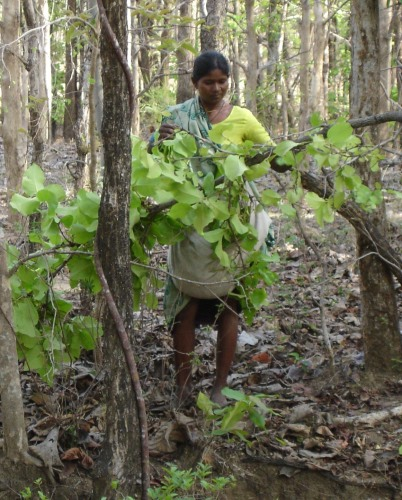
Tendu patta (leaf) collection

The leaf of the tree contains valuable flavones. The pentacyclic triterpenes found in the leaves possess antimicrobial properties, while the bark shows antihyperglycemic activity. The bark of four Diospyros species found in India has been determined to have significant antiplasmodial effects against Plasmodium falciparum, which causes malaria in humans.

== Method of collection ==
Tendu leaves are used as a wrapper for beedi. During the summer, fresh leaves are produced by the suckers that emerge from the soil. This is also enhanced by lighting a fire beneath the Tendu tree. The fresh leaves are hand-picked by the tribals and dried in the sun for 10 days. This practice is seen in Maharashtra, Madhya Pradesh, Odisha and Chhattisgarh states of India. The State Government gives the license for collection and processing of the tendu leaves through tender every year.

== Culture and mythology ==
Tendu, also known as Tiril, and Kendu has cultural and mythological reference as well. According to the Munda people, during the ancient Sengael Deaah (an event of raining fire) their predecessors took shelter in the tree hollow of the Tiril tree. Tiril (tendu) tree is considered not easily flammable. A tree hollow in the tiril tree is a usual sight as the tribes strike the trunk with big stones in order to make the ripened fruit fall. This repeated striking over time makes a hole in the tree.

Due to the non-flammable nature of the tree, after the plantation of paddy, the tribes plant a branch of it in the field in order to protect the crop from any events of Sengael Deaah in the future.

Tendu tree is also used in making hockey sticks by the adivasis of Jharkhand and Odisha. A young and straight branch of the tree is heated in fire and slowly shaped into the curves of a hockey stick.

Many villages have been named after the location and presence of the tree in the neighbourhood. These include Tiril Posi, Tiril, Tiril Haatu, Kenduda ('Tendu' is also known as Kendu in the South Chotanagpur region) in Jharkhand and the Kendhujhar district in Odisha

== Varieties ==
There is one named variety of this species, Diospyros melanoxylon var. tupru.
