= Amirul Islam (politician) =

Indian politician

Member of the West Bengal Legislative Assembly
- In office 27 May 2016 – 3 May 2026
- Preceded by: Touab Ali
- Succeeded by: Md. Noor Alam
- Constituency: Samserganj

Personal details
- Born: West Bengal, India
- Party: All India Trinamool Congress

Amirul Islam is an Indian politician belonging to All India Trinamool Congress. In 2016 he was elected as MLA of Samserganj Vidhan Sabha Constituency in West Bengal Legislative Assembly.
