= Samserganj =

Samserganj सम्शेरगञ्ज
- Village development committee
- Location in Lumbini Province Samserganj (Nepal)
- Coordinates: 28.16°N 81.66°E
- Country: Nepal
- Province: Lumbini Province
- District: Banke District

Population (1991)
  - Total: 4,880
- Time zone: UTC+5:45 (Nepal Time)

Samserganj is a village development committee in Banke District in Lumbini Province of south-western Nepal. At the time of the 1991 Nepal census it had a population of 4,880 and had 883 houses in the town.
