= Sankopara railway station =

Railway station in West Bengal, India

General information
- Location: Arjunpur, Sankopara, Murshidabad district, West Bengal; India
- Coordinates: 24°26′01″N 87°33′50″E
- Elevation: 28 m (92 ft)
- System: Passenger train station
- Owner: Indian Railways
- Operator: Eastern Railway zone
- Line: Barharwa–Azimganj–Katwa loop Line
- Platforms: 1
- Tracks: 2

Construction
- Structure type: Standard (on ground station)

Other information
- Status: Active
- Station code: SXP
- Zone(s): Eastern Railway zone
- Division(s): Malda

History
- Former names: East Indian Railway Company

Services
| Preceding station | Indian Railways | Following station |
|---|---|---|
| Dhulian Ganga towards Katwa Junction | Eastern Railway zone Barharwa–Azimganj–Katwa loop | Ballalpur towards Barharwa Junction |
Location

Sankopara railway station is a halt railway station on the Barharwa–Azimganj–Katwa loop of Malda railway division of Eastern Railway zone. It is situated beside State Highway 5 at Arjunpur, Sankopara, of Murshidabad district in the Indian state of West Bengal.

== History ==
In 1913, the Hooghly–Katwa Railway constructed a 5 ft 6 in (1,676 mm) broad gauge line from Bandel to Katwa, and the Barharwa–Azimganj–Katwa Railway constructed the 5 ft 6 in (1,676 mm) broad gauge Barharwa–Azimganj–Katwa loop. With the construction of the Farakka Barrage and opening of the railway bridge in 1971, the railway communication picture of this line were completely changed. Total 12 trains stop at Sankopara railway station.
