= Iron oxide adsorption =

Iron oxide adsorption is a water treatment process that is used to remove arsenic from drinking water. Arsenic is a common natural contaminant of well water and is highly carcinogenic. Iron oxide adsorption treatment for arsenic in groundwater is a commonly practiced removal process which involves the chemical treatment of arsenic species such that they adsorb onto iron oxides and create larger particles that may be filtered out of the water stream.

The addition of ferric chloride, FeCl_{3}, to well water immediately after the well at the influent to the treatment plant creates ferric hydroxide, Fe(OH)_{3}, and hydrochloric acid, HCl.

3H_{2}O + FeCl_{3} → Fe(OH)_{3} + 3HCl

Fe(OH)_{3} in water is a strong adsorbent of arsenate, As(V), provided that the pH is low. HCl lowers pH, assuring arsenic adsorption, and the disassociated chlorine oxidizes iron in solution from Fe^{+2} to Fe^{+3}, which then may bond with hydroxide ions, OH^{−}, thus creating more adsorbent.

This adjustment also lowers the pH of the well water, decreasing alkalinity and allowing more cationic species such Fe(+) or As(+) as to exist freely within the flow. Low pH also decreases the solubility of some iron and arsenic species as well as increasing the adsorptive reactivity of arsenate, As(V).

Additional oxidation of Fe^{+2} to Fe^{+3}, also referred to as iron(II) and iron(III), is induced by the addition of sodium hypochlorite, NaOCl, at the well head. NaOCl is usually added for disinfection although it may be used in this case towards the objectives of a distribution system free chlorine residual of 1 mg/L and the oxidation of aqueous As(III) to As(V), and aqueous iron Fe^{+2} to Fe^{+3}, which will bond with hydroxide for further adsorption.

The filter media usually consists of anthracite, iron-manganese oxidizing sand, and garnet sand over support gravel.
