= Dhuliyan =

Dhulian
- City
- Dhulian Rajbari
- Nickname: Dhulian River City
- Interactive map of Dhulian
- Location in West Bengal, India Dhulian (India)
- Coordinates: 24.681°N 87.954°E
- Country: India
- State: West Bengal
- District: Murshidabad
- Dhulian: 1909

Government
  - Type: Municipality
  - Body: Dhulian Municipality
  - Chairman: Anowar Sadat

Area
  - Total: 6.25 km^{2} (2.41 sq mi)
  - Rank: District 2nd Rank
- Elevation: 4 m (13 ft)

Population (2019)
  - Total: 120,000
  - Rank: 12th largest City West Bengal 43rd Rank in India
  - Density: 19,000/km^{2} (50,000/sq mi)

Languages
  - Official: Bengali, English
- Time zone: UTC+5:30 (IST)
- PIN: 742202
- Telephone code: +91-3485
- Vehicle registration: WB58, WB94
- Lok Sabha constituency: Maldaha Dakshin
- Vidhan Sabha constituency: Samserganj
- Website: http://Dhulianmunicipality.in

Dhulian is a municipality town in the Samserganj block of Jangipur subdivision of Murshidabad district in the state of West Bengal, India. This municipality was established in the year 1909 and comprises 21 wards. It is located between the Ganges and the Feeder canal.

Dhulian has been mentioned as an inland water transport (IWT) trading point between Murshidabad and the city of Rajshahi in Bangladesh. Low-cost barges could ply the Ganges river, called Padma in downstream Bangladesh, exchanging goods and reducing smuggling. This proposal has not been agreed to yet by the two countries.

== History ==
The site of Dhulian town was an important commercial centre during East India Company rule. There were indigo factories in and around Dhulian area, namely Ancoorah (Ankura) factory and Bunnyagaon (Baniagram) factory. These factories were attacked by the ryots from Dhoolean (Dhulian) and Kassemnuggur (Kashimnagar) during the Indigo revolt in Bengal.

The Dhulian Municipality was established in the year 1909 with 9 Wards and population of 8,295.

Prior to 1909, Dhulian was an important ferry point rural settlement which was originally located on the right bank of the Hooghly. It gradually became a river-mart of the district, being a seat of a large trade in biri, jute, rice, bellmetal, and other agricultural produces. The river-road transport stimulated the growth of the settlement and it was declared as urban centre during the first decade of the twentieth century. In 1923 the town was mainly confined to south of the Bagmari nala and north of Lalpur. The concave nature of the river bank restricts the growth of the town to the north and east. Naturally it expanded towards the south-west along the Kanchantala-Ferry Ghat Road.

Dhulian has suffered from the ravages of the Ganga since its origin. The site of this townscape has gradually shifted to the south with the southward swing of the Ganga since 1923 and the present town occupied probably the fourth site. Even earlier the main stream of the Ganga flowed more than a kilometre east of the original site. The town was severely threatened by the encroachment of the Ganga in 1924 when 7 sq. km. of land in the immediate vicinity of the town disappeared. This resulted in the migration of the town dwellers to Anupnagar where a new township was developed. Again this new site was exposed to the threatening by erosion between 1948 and 1952 when a considerable portion of the town including the main bazar and railway station were washed away.

== Geography ==
Cities, towns and locations in the northern portion of Jangipur subdivision, Murshidabad district (including Farakka, Samserganj, Suti II CD blocks)
M: municipal town, CT: census town, R: rural/ urban centre, F: Facility
Abbreviation- TPS: Thermal Power Station
Owing to space constraints in the small map, the actual locations in a larger map may vary slightly

=== Location ===
Dhulian has an average elevation of 4 metres (13 feet).

Dhulian is surrounded by Farakka (to the north), Aurangabad (to the South) Pakur (to the West) and Ganga River - (to the East). Malda district and Chapai Nababganj of Bangladesh lies to the east across the river. Dhuliyan lies on the right bank of the Ganga river.

Dhulian Urban Agglomeration includes: Dhulian (M), Anup Nagar (CT), Dhusaripara (CT), Uttar Mahammadpur (CT), Kankuria (CT), Chachanda (CT), Basudebpur (CT), Kohetpur (CT), Jaykrishnapur (CT), Jafrabad (CT).

=== Area overview ===
Jangipur subdivision is crowded with 52 census towns and as such it had to be presented in two location maps. One of the maps can be seen alongside. The subdivision is located in the Rarh region that is spread over from adjoining Santhal Pargana division of Jharkhand. The land is slightly higher in altitude than the surrounding plains and is gently undulating. The river Ganges, along with its distributaries, is prominent in both the maps. At the head of the subdivision is the 2,245 m long Farakka Barrage, one of the largest projects of its kind in the country. Murshidabad district shares with Bangladesh a porous international border which is notoriously crime prone (partly shown in this map). The subdivision has two large power plants - the 2,100 MW Farakka Super Thermal Power Station and the 1,600 MW Sagardighi Thermal Power Station. According to a 2016 report, there are around 1,000,000 (1 million/ ten lakh) workers engaged in the beedi industry in Jangipur subdivision. 90% are home-based and 70% of the home-based workers are women. As of 2013, an estimated 2.4 million people reside along the banks of the Ganges alone in Murshidabad district. Severe erosion occurs along the banks.

Note: The two maps present some of the notable locations in the subdivision. All places marked in the maps are linked in the larger full screen maps.

=== Effects of the Ganges erosion ===
Dhulian town has to face the burnt of erosion repeatedly due to its proximity to the Ganges. The town has shifted south-westward at least five kms from its original location. The old Dhulian Ganges railway station was also washed away by the ravaging river. The present Dhulian Ganga railway station is situated at Ratanpur which is around 2 km from the earlier one.

During 1952-53 the old Dhulian town was completely washed away by the river. Dhulian and its adjoining areas were greatly affected in mid 1970s when about 50,000 people became homeless. The encroaching river wiped out 50 mouzas and engulfed about 10,000 hectares of fertile land. In August 2020, this region again faced erosion which washed away dwelling places, temples, schools, litchi and mango orchards and agricultural lands along the right bank nearly after 50 years. It affected namely Dhanghora, Dhusaripara and Natun Shibpur villages of Samserganj block. In September–October 2022, Pratapganj and Maheshtola areas of Samserganj were the new victim of river bank erosion. Five houses, one temple and several bighas of land were washed away by the eroding river.

== Demographics ==
The Dhulian Municipality has population of 95,706 of which 47,635 are males while 48,071 are females as per report released by Census India 2011. The literacy rate is 63.03%. Male literacy is around 69.15% while female literacy is 56.98%.

Religion in Dhulian
Religion	Percent
Islam	78.19%
Hinduism	21.11%
Christianity	0.09%
Other or not stated	0.54%

In the 2011 Census of India, Dhulian Urban Agglomeration had a population of 239,022, out of which 119,151 were males and 119,871 were females.

As of 2001 India census, Dhulian had a population of 72,906 of which males are 36524 and females are 36382. Dhulian had an average literacy rate of 39%. Male literacy was 48% and female literacy was 31%.

== Civic administration ==
=== Police station ===
Samserganj police station, located in Dhulian, has jurisdiction over Samserganj CD block.

=== CD block HQ ===
The headquarters of Samserganj CD block are located at Dhulian.

== Infrastructure ==
According to the District Census Handbook, Murshidabad, 2011, Dhulian covered an area of 6.25 km^{2}. It had 131.95 km roads with open drains. The protected water-supply involved overhead tank, tap water from untreated source, hand pump. It had 6,071 domestic electric connections, 1 road lighting point. Among the medical facilities it had 1 hospital, 5 dispensaries/ health centres, 2 charitable hospitals/ nursing homes, 23 medicine shops. Among the educational facilities, it had 50 primary schools, 3 secondary schools, 3 senior secondary schools in town, 1 general degree college at Tarapar 3.5 km away. It had 4 recognised shorthand, typewriting & vocational training institutes, 1 non-formal education centre (Sarva Shiksha Abhiyan). Among the social, recreational & cultural facilities it had 1 public library, 1 reading room. It produced beedi, knitted products, pottery. It had the branch offices of 2 nationalised banks, 1 agricultural credit society, 1 non-agricultural credit society.

== Commerce and industry ==
Dhulian is a well known commercial centre from the time period of Company rule.

A lot of people of Dhuliyan earn their livelihood by making & selling of Biris. A number of Biri Industries are located here. Some people are engaged in running business of wholesale & retail sale of articles like cloth, readymade garments, bedding, furniture, hardware goods and utensils made of bell metal, steel and aluminum. Wholesale business of rice, flour, and spice are also running from this place. As such gathering of carrying vehicles can be found on the road of entrance to the town, day & night.

== Transport ==
Rail Transportation

Dhulian Ganga railway station is the nearest railway station. It is situated in Malda railway division of Barharwa–Azimganj–Katwa loop line.

Dhulian is well connected with Kolkata and Berhampore by Malda town Fast Passenger, Malda town Intercity Express, Radhikapur Express, Teesta Torsha Express, Kamrup Express and a few more.

Pakur is another railway station at a distance of 14 km from this place in Jharkhand state from where a number trains are available connecting Kolkata viz. Gour Express, Balurghat Express, Intercity Express (via Rampurhat), Darjeeling Mail, Hate Bazare Express.

Road Transportation

National Highway 12 (old no. NH 34) passes through New Duckbunglow area of Dhulian connecting this place with Kolkata and Siliguri. Bus services are available in this route.

Dhulian is also connected with Pakur town of Jharkhand State via Dhulian-Pakur Road.

Water Transport

Dhulian Ghat is connected to Parlalpur Ghat of Maldah district via ferry services across the Ganga river.

== Culture and traditions ==
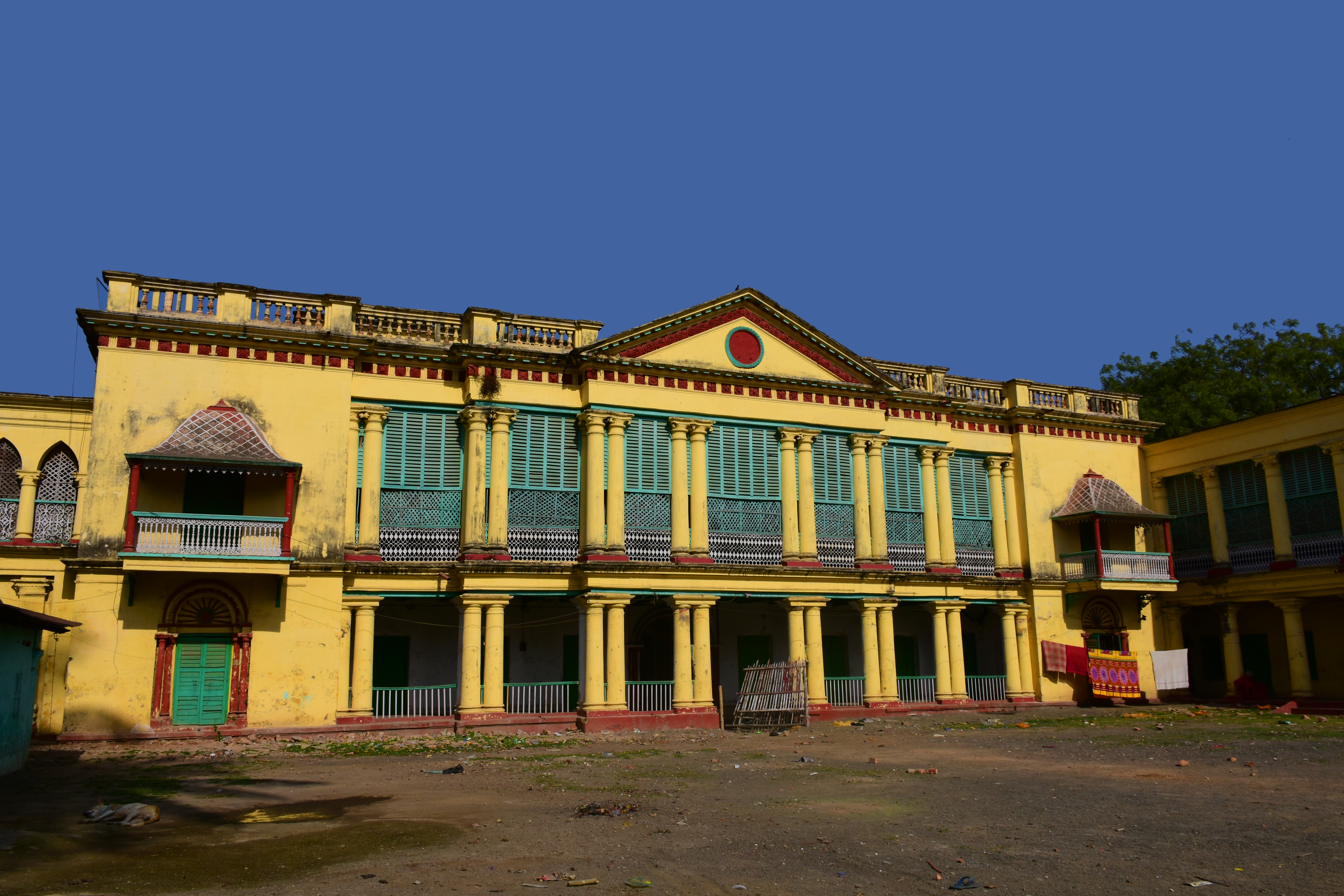
Dhulian Rajbari

Dhulian Rajbari

Approximately two thirds of the population belongs to the Muslim community, and the remaining one third belong to the Hindu and Jain communities. The percentage of literate adults is 52.53.

The town stands on the bank of the Ganges, which has been changing its course regularly; a large part of the town has thus been ravaged, creating opportunity for new development. Dhulian Rajbari has escaped the destructive force of the river, and boasts of its celebration of a 300 year old Durga Puja.

== Healthcare ==
- Anupnagar Rural Hospital, with 30 beds, is a major government facility in Samserganj (community development block).
- Tarapur Central Hospital for beedi workers at Tarapur, run by BWWF
- Dhuliyan Diagnostic & Healthcare Pvt Ltd. (DDH)
- Dhulian Nursing Home
- The O2 Hospitals
- Netaji Nursing Home
- Notun jeevan hospital

== See also ==
- River bank erosion along the Ganges in Malda and Murshidabad districts
