= Arsenic contamination of groundwater =

Form of water pollution

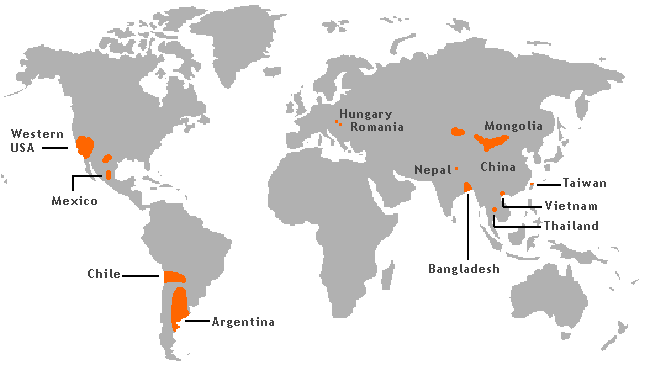
Groundwater arsenic contamination areas

Arsenic contamination of groundwater is a form of groundwater pollution which is often due to naturally occurring high concentrations of arsenic in deeper levels of groundwater. It is a high-profile problem due to the use of deep tube wells for water supply in the Ganges Delta, causing serious arsenic poisoning to large numbers of people. A 2007 study found that over 137 million people in more than 70 countries are probably affected by arsenic poisoning of drinking water. The problem became a serious health concern after mass poisoning of water in Bangladesh. Arsenic contamination of ground water is found in many countries throughout the world, including the US.

The World Health Organization recommends limiting arsenic concentrations in water to 10 μg/L, although this is often an unattainable goal for many problem areas due to the difficult nature of removing arsenic from water sources.

Approximately 20 major incidents of groundwater arsenic contamination have been reported. Locations of potentially hazardous wells have been mapped in China.

== Sources ==
Gold mining can contaminate groundwater with arsenic, because the element typically occurs in gold-containing ores. Gold processing releases arsenic from mine tailings, and contaminated groundwater may be unsafe to drink for decades. Arsenic that is naturally occurring can contaminate the soil, just as it does the groundwater. This presents a possible arsenic exposure by use of products containing tobacco, because the tobacco plant grows from the soil and can become infiltrated with the arsenic.

== Speciation of arsenic compounds in water ==
Arsenic contaminated water typically contains arsenous acid and arsenic acid or their derivatives. Their names as "acids" is a formality; these species are not aggressive acids but are merely the soluble forms of arsenic near neutral pH. These compounds are extracted from the underlying rocks that surround the aquifer. Arsenic acid tends to exist as the ions [HAsO_{4}]^{2−} and [H_{2}AsO_{4}]^{−} in neutral water, whereas arsenous acid is not ionized.

Arsenic acid (H_{3}AsO_{4}), arsenous acid (H_{3}AsO_{3}) and their derivatives are typically encountered in arsenic contaminated ground water.

== Contamination in specific nations and regions ==
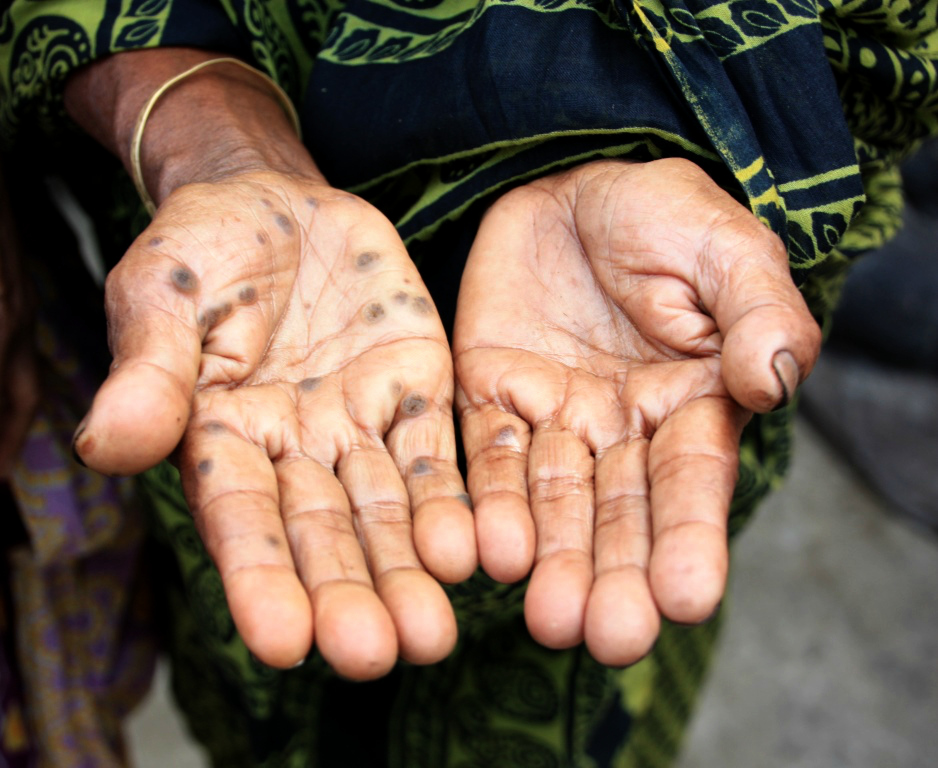
This person displays some of the symptoms of arsenic poisoning through contaminated water.

=== South America ===
An analysis of water and food consumption in Socaire, a rural village in Chile, found that between November 2008 and September 2009, the total intake of arsenic by the villagers correlated with the amount of water and local produce consumed.

The central portion of Argentina is affected by arsenic-contaminated groundwater. Specifically, the La Pampa produces water containing 4–5300 microgram per liter.

=== South Asia ===
==== Bangladesh ====
Arsenic contamination of the groundwater in Bangladesh is a serious problem. Prior to the 1970s, Bangladesh had one of the highest infant mortality rates in the world. Ineffective water purification and sewage systems, as well as periodic monsoons and flooding, exacerbated these problems. As a solution, UNICEF and the World Bank advocated the use of wells to tap into deeper groundwater. During the 1970s, UNICEF worked with the Department of Public Health Engineering to install tube-wells. The wells consist of tubes 5 cm in diameter inserted less than 200 m into the ground and capped with an iron or steel hand pump. At that time, standard water testing procedures did not include arsenic testing. This lack of precaution led to one of the largest mass poisonings of a population because the ground water used for drinking was contaminated with arsenic.

Tube-wells were supposed to draw water from underground aquifers to provide a safe source of water for the nation. Millions of wells were constructed as a result. In 1993, it was discovered that groundwater in large parts of Bangladesh was naturally contaminated with arsenic. The issue came to international attention in 1995.

In the Ganges Delta, the affected wells are typically more than 20 meters and less than 100 meters deep. Groundwater closer to the surface typically has spent a shorter time in the ground, therefore likely absorbing a lower concentration of arsenic; water deeper than 100 meters is exposed to much older sediments, which have already been depleted of arsenic.

Criticism has been leveled at the aid agencies, who denied the problem during the 1990s while millions of tube wells were sunk. The aid agencies later hired foreign experts who recommended treatment plants that were inappropriate to the conditions, were regularly breaking down, or were not removing the arsenic.

==== India ====
In Bihar, groundwater in 13 districts have been found to be contaminated with arsenic with quantities exceeding 0.05 mg/L. All these districts are situated close to large rivers like Ganga and Gandak.

In West Bengal, India, water is mostly supplied from rivers, open wells, or ponds. These may be contaminated with communicable diseases such as dysentery, typhoid, cholera, and hepatitis. Since the 1970s, non-governmental organisations in India have focused on sinking tube wells to provide drinking water uncontaminated by diseases, with the unforeseen side effect of exposing some people to arsenic-contaminated groundwater.

==== Nepal ====
Nepal is subject to a serious problem with arsenic contamination. The problem is most severe in the Terai region, the worst being near Nawalparasi District, where 26 percent of shallow wells failed to meet WHO standard of 10 ppb. A study by Japan International Cooperation Agency and the Environment in the Kathmandu Valley showed that 72% of deep wells failed to meet the WHO standard, and 12% failed to meet the Nepali standard of 50 ppb.

==== Pakistan ====
66% of 1200 samples tested contained arsenic above WHO recommended limit, threatening over 60 million residents. 50–60 million residents consume water with arsenic levels greater than 50 micrograms of arsenic per liter, levels far passing acceptable levels worldwide.

=== United States ===
==== Regulation ====
A drinking water standard of 0.05 mg/L (equal to 50 parts per billion, or ppb) arsenic was originally established in the United States by the Public Health Service in 1942. After the passage of the Safe Drinking Water Act of 1974 (SDWA), the Environmental Protection Agency (EPA) was given the power to set the maximum contaminant levels (MCLs) of contaminants in public water supplies. In 1996 Congress amended the SDWA and created a Drinking Water State Revolving Fund to provide loans for water supply improvements, which increased the EPA's power to set mandates. This amendment created the "costs and benefits rule" to determine whether the cost of implementing new MCLs outweighs the health benefits. To maximize the costs and benefits of setting new MLCs, the EPA began allowing more affordable technology to be substituted that did not fully meet MLC standards because it was more affordable.

The EPA studied the pros and cons of lowering the arsenic MCL for years in the late 1980s and 1990s. No action was taken until January 2001, when the Clinton administration in its final weeks promulgated a new standard of 0.01 mg/L (10 ppb) to take effect January 2006. The Bush administration suspended the midnight regulation, but after some months of study, the new EPA administrator Christine Todd Whitman approved the new 10 ppb arsenic standard and its original effective date of January 2006. Many locations exceed this limit. A 2017 Lancet Public Health study found that this rule change led to fewer cancer deaths.

Many public water supply systems across the United States obtained their water supply from groundwater that had met the old 50 ppb arsenic standard but exceeded the new 10 ppb MCL. These utilities searched for either an alternative supply or an inexpensive treatment method to remove the arsenic from their water. In Arizona, an estimated 35 percent of water-supply wells were put out of compliance by the new regulation; in California, the percentage was 38 percent.

The proper arsenic MCL continues to be debated. Some have argued that the 10 ppb federal standard is still too high, while others have argued that 10 ppb is needlessly strict. Individual states can establish lower arsenic limits; New Jersey has done so, setting a maximum of 0.005 mg/L (5 ppb) for arsenic in drinking water.

A study of private water wells in the Appalachian mountains found that six percent of the wells had arsenic above the U.S. MCL of 0.010 mg/L.

==== Case studies and incidents ====
Fallon, Nevada has long been known to have groundwater with relatively high arsenic concentrations (in excess of 0.08 mg/L). Even some surface waters, such as the Verde River in Arizona, sometimes exceed 0.01 mg/L arsenic, especially during low-flow periods when the river flow is dominated by groundwater discharge.

A study conducted in a contiguous six-county area of southeastern Michigan investigated the relationship between moderate arsenic levels and 23 disease outcomes. Disease outcomes included several types of cancer, diseases of the circulatory and respiratory system, diabetes mellitus, and kidney and liver diseases. Elevated mortality rates were observed for all diseases of the circulatory system. The researchers acknowledged a need to replicate their findings.

Various studies have also shown that arsenic exposure during pregnancy can result in infant death, cancer, heart attacks, kidney failure, lung complications, as well as reduced intelligence, memory, and cognitive development in the child.

== Water purification solutions ==
Access to clean drinking water is fraught with political, socio-economic, and cultural inequities. In practice, many water treatment strategies tend to be temporary fixes to a larger problem, often prolonging the social issues while treating the scientific ones. Scientific studies have shown that interdisciplinary approaches to water purification are especially important to consider, and long-lasting improvements involve larger perspectives than strict scientific approaches.

=== Small-scale water treatment ===
A review of methods to remove arsenic from groundwater in Pakistan summarizes the most technically viable inexpensive methods. Most small-scale treatments focus on water after it has left the distribution site, and are thus more focused on quick, temporary fixes.

A simpler and less expensive form of arsenic removal is known as the Sono arsenic filter, using three pitchers containing cast iron turnings and sand in the first pitcher and wood activated carbon and sand in the second. Plastic buckets can also be used as filter containers. It is claimed that thousands of these systems are in use and can last for years while avoiding the toxic waste disposal problem inherent to conventional arsenic removal plants. Although novel, this filter has not been certified by any sanitary standards such as NSF, ANSI, WQA and does not avoid toxic waste disposal similar to any other iron removal process.

In the United States small "under the sink" units have been used to remove arsenic from drinking water. This option is called "point of use" treatment. The most common types of domestic treatment use the technologies of adsorption (using media such as Bayoxide E33, GFH, activated alumina or titanium dioxide) or reverse osmosis. Ion exchange and activated alumina have been considered but not commonly used.

Chaff-based filters have been reported to reduce the arsenic content of water to 3 μg/L (3 ppb). This is especially important in areas where the potable water is provided by filtering the water extracted from the underground aquifer.

In iron electrocoagulation (Fe-EC), iron is dissolved nonstop using electricity, and the resulting ferric hydroxides, oxyhydroxides, and oxides form an absorbent readily attracted to arsenic. Current density, the amount of charge delivered per liter of water, of the process is often manipulated in order to achieve maximum arsenic depletion. This treatment strategy has primarily been used in Bangladesh, and has proven to be largely successful. In fact, using iron electrocoagulation to remove arsenic in water proved to be the most effective treatment option.

=== Large-scale water treatment ===
In some places, such as the United States, all the water supplied to residences by utilities must meet primary (health-based) drinking water standards. Regulations may require large-scale treatment systems to remove arsenic from the water supply. The effectiveness of any method depends on the chemical makeup of a particular water supply. The aqueous chemistry of arsenic is complex, and may affect the removal rate that can be achieved by a particular process.

Some large utilities with multiple water supply wells could shut down those wells with high arsenic concentrations, and produce only from wells or surface water sources that meet the arsenic standard. Other utilities, however, especially small utilities with only a few wells, may have no available water supply that meets the arsenic standard.

Coagulation/filtration (also known as flocculation) removes arsenic by coprecipitation and adsorption using iron coagulants. Coagulation/filtration using alum is already used by some utilities to remove suspended solids and may be adjusted to remove arsenic.

Iron oxide adsorption filters the water through a granular medium containing ferric oxide. Ferric oxide has a high affinity for adsorbing dissolved metals such as arsenic. The iron oxide medium eventually becomes saturated, and must be replaced. The sludge disposal is a problem here too.

Activated alumina is an adsorbent that effectively removes arsenic. Activated alumina columns connected to shallow tube wells in India and Bangladesh have removed both As(III) and As(V) from groundwater for decades. Long-term column performance has been possible through the efforts of community-elected water committees that collect a local water tax for funding operations and maintenance. It has also been used to remove undesirably high concentrations of fluoride.

Ion exchange has long been used as a water softening process, although usually on a single-home basis. Traditional anion exchange resins are effective in removing As(V), but not As(III), or arsenic trioxide, which doesn't have a net charge. Effective long-term ion exchange removal of arsenic requires a trained operator to maintain the column.

Both reverse osmosis and electrodialysis (also called electrodialysis reversal) can remove arsenic with a net ionic charge. (Note that arsenic oxide, As_{2}O_{3}, is a common form of arsenic in groundwater that is soluble, but has no net charge.) Some utilities presently use one of these methods to reduce total dissolved solids and therefore improve taste. A problem with both methods is the production of high-salinity waste water, called brine, or concentrate, which then must be disposed of.

Subterranean arsenic removal (SAR) technology SAR Technology

In subterranean arsenic removal, aerated groundwater is recharged back into the aquifer to create an oxidation zone which can trap iron and arsenic on the soil particles through adsorption process. The oxidation zone created by aerated water boosts the activity of the arsenic-oxidizing microorganisms which can oxidize arsenic from +3 to +5 state SAR Technology. No chemicals are used and almost no sludge is produced during operational stage since iron and arsenic compounds are rendered inactive in the aquifer itself. Thus toxic waste disposal and the risk of its future mobilization is prevented. Also, it has very long operational life, similar to the long lasting tube wells drawing water from the shallow aquifers.

Six such SAR plants, funded by the World Bank and constructed by Ramakrishna Vivekananda Mission, Barrackpore & Queen's University Belfast, UK are operating in West Bengal. Each plant has been delivering more than 3,000 liters of arsenic and iron-free water daily to the rural community. The first community water treatment plant based on SAR technology was set up at Kashimpore near Kolkata in 2004 by a team of European and Indian engineers led by Bhaskar Sen Gupta of Queen's University Belfast for TiPOT.

SAR technology had been awarded Dhirubhai Ambani Award, 2010 from IChemE UK for Chemical Innovation. Again, SAR was the winner of the St. Andrews Award for Environment, 2010. The SAR Project was selected by the Blacksmith Institute – New York & Green Cross- Switzerland as one of the "12 Cases of Cleanup & Success" in the World's Worst Polluted Places Report 2009. (Refer: www.worstpolluted.org).

Currently, large scale SAR plants are being installed in US, Malaysia, Cambodia, and Vietnam.

=== Nanotechnology based arsenic remediation ===
Using nanomaterials, it is possible to effectively destroy microorganisms, adsorb arsenic and fluoride, remove heavy metals and degrade pesticides usually found in water. Researchers have looked at new methods to synthesize iron oxide/hydroxide/oxyhydroxide compositions in the laboratory and used them for water purification. A product called AMRIT, meaning elixir in Indian languages, developed by the Indian Institute of Technology Madras, is an affordable water purification technology based on advanced materials, which has been validated through research articles and patents and has been approved for national implementation in India. The technology can remove several anions, especially arsenate and arsenite (two common species present in arsenic-contaminated water) and fluoride from water. Currently, this technology is delivering arsenic-free water to about 10,00,000 people every day.

== Research ==
=== Mapping ===
In 2008, the Swiss Aquatic Research Institute, Eawag, presented a new method by which hazard maps could be produced for geogenic toxic substances in groundwater. This provides an efficient way of determining which wells should be tested. In 2016, the research group made its knowledge freely available on the Groundwater Assessment Platform (GAP). This offers specialists worldwide the possibility of uploading their own measurement data, visually displaying them and producing risk maps for areas of their choice. GAP also serves as a knowledge-sharing forum for enabling further development of methods for removing toxic substances from water.

=== Dietary intake ===
Researchers from Bangladesh and the United Kingdom have claimed that dietary intake of arsenic adds significantly to total intake where contaminated water is used for irrigation.

== See also ==
- Arsenic poisoning
- Grainger challenge
- Toxic heavy metal
- Arsenic
