= River bank erosion along the Ganges in Malda and Murshidabad districts =

Erosion in India

River bank erosion along the Ganges in Malda and Murshidabad districts focusses on river bank erosion along the main channel of the Ganges in Malda and Mushidabad districts of West Bengal, India.

== Overview ==
The Ganges is a long river carrying a huge discharge of 70,000 m^{3}/s. However, the river bank erosion problems are restricted to a few places. Floods and erosion pose a serious problem in the lower Ganges region, particularly in West Bengal. The Ganges enters West Bengal after wandering around the Rajmahal hills in Jharkhand. After flowing through Malda district, it enters Murshidabad district, where it splits into two river channels – the Bhagirathi flows south through West Bengal and the Padma flows east into Bangladesh. River bank erosion is a common problem in river channels in the deltaic tracts and is widespread throughout the course of the Ganges in West Bengal. Official reports show that on an average 8 km^{2} of land is engulfed annually by the river in West Bengal.

The Ganges forms one of the major river systems in India. From the Gangotri Glacier, it traverses a distance of 2,525 km to the Bay of Bengal. The river carries millions of tonnes of sediment load and deposits it in the plains. The sediment deposition creates many severe problems like the decrease of river depth.

The Ganges is a meandering river and Farakka Barrage has disrupted the dynamic equilibrium of the river and hindered the natural oscillation of the river within its meandering belt, which is about 10 km wide in Malda and Murshidabad districts. The river has a general tendency to shift towards the left bank upstream of the Farakka Barrage and towards the right bank downstream of it. River bank failure is because of certain factors like soil stratification of the river bank, presence of hard rocky area (Rajmahal), high load of sediment, difficulty of dredging and construction of Farakka Barrage as an obstruction to the natural river flow. The rivers in Murshidabad district have been continuously changing their meandering-geometry actively since second half of the twentieth century but the dimension of river bank erosion has been increased after construction of Farakka Barrage. More than 200 km^{2} of fertile land was completely wiped out till 2004 in Malda district. As of 2004, the Ganges had eroded 356 km^{2} of fertile land and displaced around 80,000 people in the period 1988 – 1994, in Murshidabad district.

== Malda district ==
In the early decades of the twentieth century, the Ganges flowed in a south-easterly course between Rajmahal and Farakka, but later in the century it formed a large meander to accommodate the additional water because of the barrage construction. Furthermore, nearly 64 crore (640 million) tonnes of silt is accumulated annually on the river bed. All these lead to massive erosion of the left bank.

During the period 1969-1999, 4.5 lakh people were affected by left bank erosion of the Ganges in Malda district, upstream of the Farakka Barrage. 22 mouzas in Manickchak, Kaliachak I and Kaliachak II CD Blocks have gone into the river. Other affected areas are in Kaliachak III, Ratua I and Ratua II CD Blocks. The worst-hit areas lie in the left bank of the river stretch between Bhutnidiara and Panchanandapore in the Kaliachak II block. Even in the 1960s, Panchanandapur was a flourishing river-port and trading centre. It had the block headquarters, high school, sugar mill and a regular weekly market where traders used to come by large boats from Rajmahal, Sahebganj, Dhuliyan and other towns. After being hit by river bank erosion much of what was there at Panchanandapur has shifted to Chethrumahajantola. The Ganga Bhangan Pratirodh Action Nagarik Committee’s survey revealed a loss of 750 km^{2} area in Kaliachak and Manikchak. 60 primary schools, 14 high schools, coveted mango orchards have gone leaving 40,000 affected families.

During the period 1990-2001 Hiranandapur, Manikchak, Gopalpur of Manikchak CD Block and Kakribondha Jhaubona of Kaliachak II CD Block were badly affected by river bank erosion. In 2004-05 large scale erosion took place in Kakribondha Jhaubona and Panchanandapur-I gram panchayats of Kaliachak II CD Block and Dakshin Chandipur, Manikchak, and Dharampur gram panchayets of Manikchak CD Block. Kakribondha Jhaubona, a gram panchayat, was totally lost by river bank erosion. The affected persons and their administrative responsibilities were merged with Bangitola gram panchayet administration.

River bank failures occur in two phases. Pre-flood bank failure occurs because of the high pressure of increasing water on the bank walls. During floods the area is submerged and water seeps into the weak soil. After the floods, the banks collapse in chunks. Every monsoon a large number people are affected by river bank erosion. They become landless and lose their livelihood. It creates neo-refugees with many social problems. Sometimes, poverty leads to increase in crime. The consequences of floods are of the short range as economic recovery is possible, but effects of the slow and steady disaster of river bank erosion are of permanent nature, where the entire socio-economic structure is damaged and the affected population has to move and settle somewhere else. People seriously affected by river bank erosion in Malda have migrated in search of work to as far as Gujarat and Maharashtra. At Byculla, Mumbai, there is a whole colony of erosion affected people of Malda, where they are often branded as Bangladeshi infiltrators, as they have lost not only their belongings but also their documents in the erosion. Such is the tragedy of these neo-refugees in their own country.

In the remote past, the Ganges used to flow past Gauda, 40 km downstream from Rajmahal. Over a long period, the river shifted westward and now it tends to come to its earlier position. Therefore, the whole belt up to Gauda is risk zone for river bank erosion.

A group of experts has suggested the pressure on the left bank be reduced by diverting flow from the eroding channel. Alternatively, it is possible that in one devastating flood the Ganges will merge with Kalindri in the eastern side and the combined flow will merge with Mahananda at Nimasarai Ghat of Malda and afterwards the collective flow will merge with Ganges/ Padma in Godagari Ghat of Bangladesh. The Ganges has numerous abandoned channels in the area.

== Murshidabad district ==
As of 2013, an estimated 2.4 million people reside along the banks of the Ganges alone in Murshidabad district. The main channel of the Ganges has a bankline of 94 km along its right bank from downstream of Farakka Barrage to Jalangi. Severe erosion occurs all along this bank. From a little above Nimtita, about 20 km downstream from Farakka, the Ganges flows along the international boundary with Bangladesh in the left bank. The following blocks have to face the brunt of erosion year after year: Farakka, Samserganj, Suti I, Suti II, Raghunathganj II, Lalgola, Bhagawangola I, Bhagawangola II, Raninagar I, Raninagar II and Jalangi.

According to government reports between 1931 and 1977, 26769 hectares of lands have been eroded and many villages have been fully submerged. Thousands of people have lost their dwellings. Between 1988 and 1994, 206.60 square km. land was eroded displacing 14,236 families.

During 1952-53 the old Dhuliyan town was completely washed away by the river. Dhuliyan and its adjoining areas were greatly affected in mid 1970s when about 50,000 people became homeless. The encroaching river wiped out 50 mouzas and engulfed about 10,000 hectares of fertile land. In August 2020, this region again faced erosion which washed away dwelling places, temples, schools, litchi and mango orchards and agricultural lands along the right bank nearly after 50 years. It affected namely Dhanghora, Dhusaripara and Natun Shibpur villages of Samserganj block. In September-October 2022, Pratapganj and Maheshtola areas of Samserganj were the new victim of river bank erosion. Five houses, one temple and several bighas of land were washed away by the eroding river.

According to the Report on Impact of the Farakka Barrage on the Human Fabric: "People in Murshidabad had been experiencing erosion for the last two centuries but the ravages caused by the mighty Padma at Akheriganj in 1989 and 1990 surpassed all previous records. Akheriganj disappeared from the map destroying 2,766 houses, leaving 23,394 persons homeless many of whom migrated to the newly emerged Nirmal Char along the opposite bank…. This area has lost its school, college, places of worship, panchayat office to the raging Padma…. Original Akheriganj of nearly 20,000 inhabitants has gone into the river around 1994."

"Jalangi situated 50 km east of Baharampur district headquarter has suffered tremendously in 1994-95. At Jalangi Bazaar severe erosion started in September 1995 engulfing nearly 400 metre width of land within a week and then high built up homestead land thereby destroying Jalangi High School, Gram Panchayat Office, Thana and innumerable buildings rendering nearly 12000 people homeless."

"As per official estimate, till 1992-94 more than 10,000 hectares of chars (flood plain sediment island) have developed in main places, which have become inaccessible from the Indian side but can be reached easily from Bangladesh. The erosion wiped away boundary posts at many places creating border dispute. In Parliament when this issue was raised the House was assured that the boundary was fixed on the map even though the river has shifted".

"One typical example is that of Nirmal char built by eroding Akheriganj. Here a population of 20,000 lives in an area of 50 sq.km. From here Rajshahi city of Bangladesh can be reached within 45 minutes on road whereas to come to the mainland of India one has to cross the mighty Padma which will take more than three hours. Moreover, the basic infrastructure provided here is too poor and the people’s plight is further heightened by negligence of the mainland administration. Since there is no primary health centre, people go to Rajshahi for treatment. The concept of international border is very much flexible here due to basic problems of living. Instances of fighting for harvesting with Bangladeshi cultivators have been reported again and again apart from the usual problem of allotting created land to the rightful owners. Once again, the question of Bangladeshi infiltrators, the recent fiasco over ISI agents have increased in this district due to these char areas."

"Downstream of Jangipur Barrage the river Ganga/Padma is swinging away close to river Bhagirathi at Fazilpur leaving only 1.34 km. in width. In 1996, this distance was 2.86 km. If Ganga/Padma actually merges with Bhagirathi due to the natural tendency, it will lead to flood and catastrophe in the entire Bhagirathi basin. Bhagirathi water remains at a higher elevation than the river Ganga/Padma during lean season and if they merge the water of the feeder canal will flow through Padma to Bangladesh defeating the very purpose of the Farakka Project."
