= Samserganj Assembly constituency =

Samserganj
- Constituency No. 56 for the West Bengal Legislative Assembly
- Interactive Map Outlining Samserganj Assembly Constituency

Constituency details
- Country: India
- Region: East India
- State: West Bengal
- District: Murshidabad
- Lok Sabha constituency: Maldaha Dakshin
- Established: 2011
- Total electors: 235,570
- Reservation: None

Member of Legislative Assembly
- 18th West Bengal Legislative Assembly
- Incumbent Md. Noor Alam
- Party: Democratic Trinamool Congress
- Elected year: 2026

Samserganj Assembly constituency is an assembly constituency in Murshidabad district in the Indian state of West Bengal.

== Overview ==
As per orders of the Delimitation Commission, No. 56 Samserganj Assembly constituency covers Dhulian municipality and Bhasaipaikar, Bogdadnagar, Chachanda, Dogachhi, Napara, Nimtita, Pratapganj and Tinpukuria gram panchayats of Samserganj community development block.

Samserganj Assembly constituency is part of No. 8 Maldaha Dakshin (Lok Sabha constituency).

== Members of the Legislative Assembly ==
Year	Name	Party
2011	Touab Ali	Communist Party of India (Marxist)
2016	Amirul Islam	Trinamool Congress
2021	Amirul Islam	Trinamool Congress
2026	Mohammad Noor Alam	Trinamool Congress

== Election results ==
=== 2026 ===
2026 West Bengal Legislative Assembly election: Samserganj
Party	Candidate	Votes	%	±%
AITC	Mohammad Noor Alam	61,918	39.84	−11.29
INC	Najme Alam	54,331	34.96	−2.18
BJP	Sasthi Charan Ghosh	34,522	22.21	+16.48
NOTA	None of the above	1,654	1.06	−0.56
Majority		7,587	4.88	−9.11
Turnout		155,430	96.24	+16.19
AITC hold		Swing		

=== 2021 ===
2021 West Bengal Legislative Assembly election: Samserganj
Party	Candidate	Votes	%	±%
AITC	Amirul Islam	96,417	51.13	▲20.72
INC	Zaidur Rahman	70,038	37.14	
BJP	Milan Ghosh	10,800	5.73	▼1.44
CPI(M)	Md. Modassar Hossain	6,158	3.27	▼26.04
NOTA	None of the above	3,064	1.62	
Majority		26,379	13.99	
Turnout		188,582	80.05	
AITC hold		Swing		

=== 2016 ===
2016 West Bengal Legislative Assembly election: Samserganj
Party	Candidate	Votes	%	±%
AITC	Amirul Islam	48,381	30.41	
CPI(M)	Touab Ali	46,601	29.31	
IND	Md. Rejaul Hoque	42,389	26.66	
BJP	Milan Ghosh	11,397	7.17	
NOTA	None of the above	3,290	2.07	
Majority		1,780	1.12	
Turnout		1,59,033	81.92	
AITC gain from CPI(M)		Swing		

=== 2011 ===
In the 2011 election, Touab Ali of CPI(M) defeated his nearest rival Mousumi Begum of Congress,

2011 West Bengal Legislative Assembly election: Samserganj
Party	Candidate	Votes	%	±%
CPI(M)	Touab Ali	61,138	46.43	
INC	Mousumi Begum	53,349	40.52	
BJP	Sasthi Charan Ghosh	6,031	4.58	
SDPI	Md Affan Ali	4,256	3.23	
BSP	Jaydeb Goswami	2,411	1.83	
IND	Seikh Samshul	1,966	1.49	
Majority		7,789	5.92	
Turnout		1,31,694	86.35	
CPI(M) win (new seat)				
