= Beedi =

South Asian hand-made cigarette

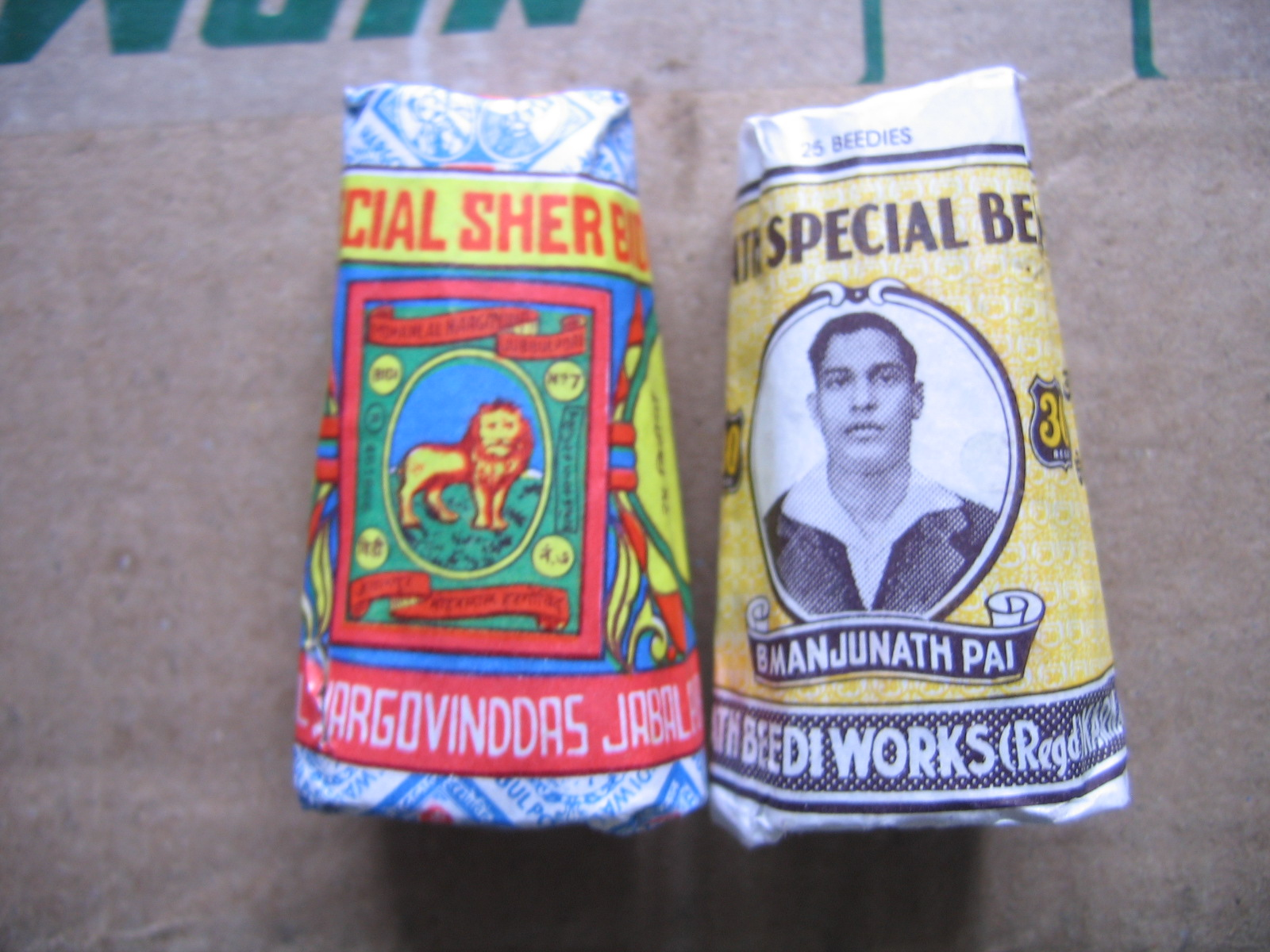
Packs of beedies.

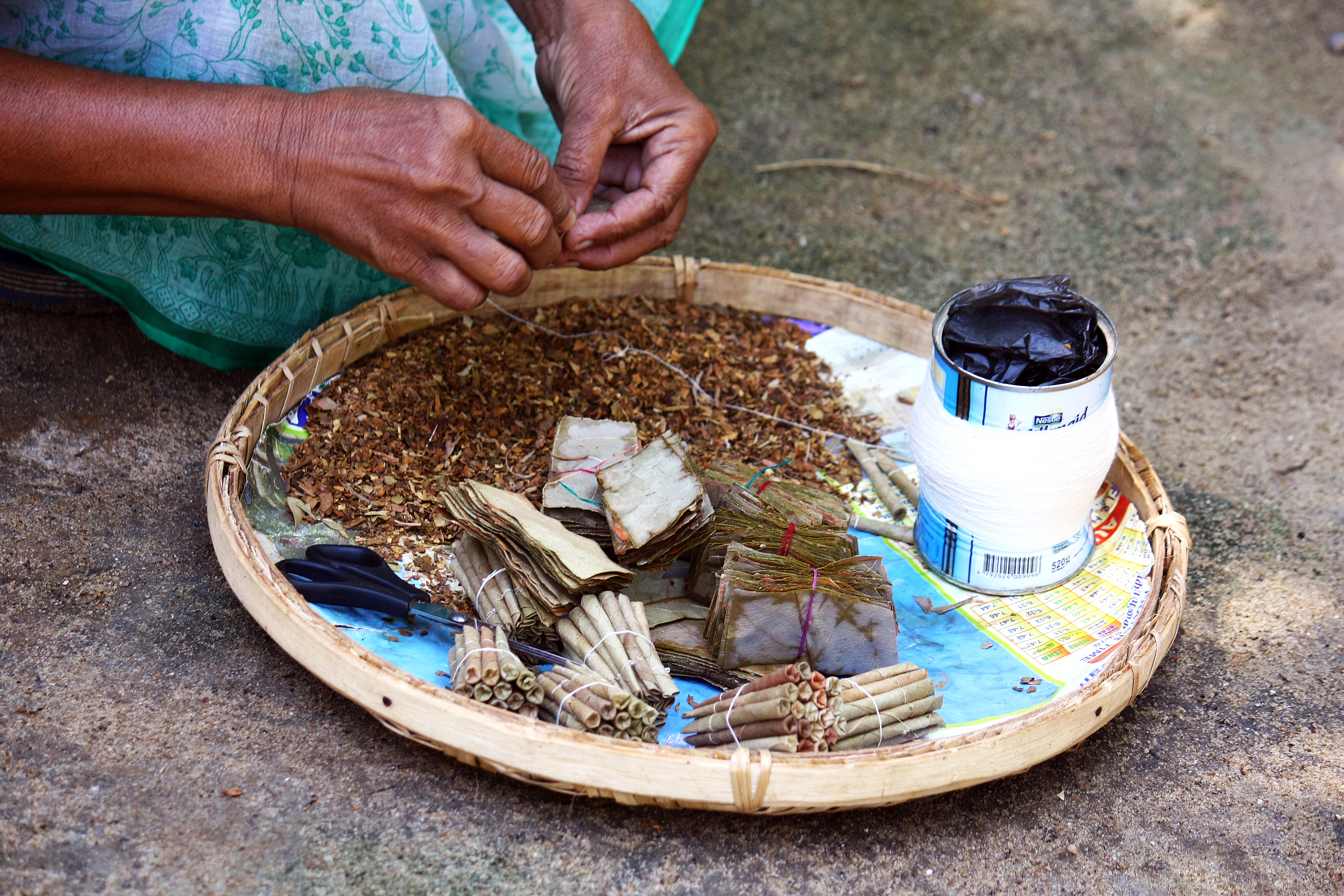
Beedi making process, rare handicrafts in Akkaraipattu, Sri Lanka. Bidi leaf (Bauhinia racemosa) and shredded tobacco are prepared and finalized with thread binding.

A beedi (also spelled bidi or biri) is a thin cigarette or mini-cigar filled with tobacco flake and commonly wrapped in a tendu (Diospyros melanoxylon) or Piliostigma racemosum leaf tied with a string or adhesive at one end. It originates from the Indian subcontinent. The name is derived from the Marwari word beeda—a mixture of betel nuts, herbs, and spices wrapped in a leaf. It is a traditional method of tobacco use throughout South Asia and parts of the Middle East, where beedies are popular and inexpensive. In India, beedi consumption outpaces conventional cigarettes, accounting for 48% of all Indian tobacco consumption in 2008.

== History ==
Beedies were invented after Indian tobacco cultivation began in the late 17th century. Tobacco workers were the first to create them by taking leftover tobacco and rolling it in leaves.

The commercial Indian beedi industry saw rapid growth during the 1930s probably driven by an expansion of tobacco cultivation at the time but also helped by Gandhi's support of Indian industry and Indian products. Perhaps due to this, educated classes in India grew to prefer beedies to cigarettes although this is no longer the case. Muslim leaders, calling cigarettes foreign products, have also endorsed beedies at times.

By the middle of the 20th century, beedi manufacture had grown into a highly competitive and profitable industry. This stage of commercial production—at the height of the beedi's popularity—saw the creation of many new beedi brands as well as beedi factories employing upwards of one hundred, primarily male, beedi rollers.

Factory-based beedi production declined as a result of increased regulation during the 1940s, 1950s, and 1960s, and beedi-making became a cottage industry with a home-based women workforce predominantly employed only in the beedi rolling. In contrast, males continue to be employed in other aspects of beedi production.

Beedi smoking tends to be associated with a lower social standing, as these tobacco-filled leaves are inexpensive when compared to regular cigarettes. Those with a high social standing who do smoke beedies often do so out of the public eye; however, the cultural trend is changing.

== Manufacturing ==
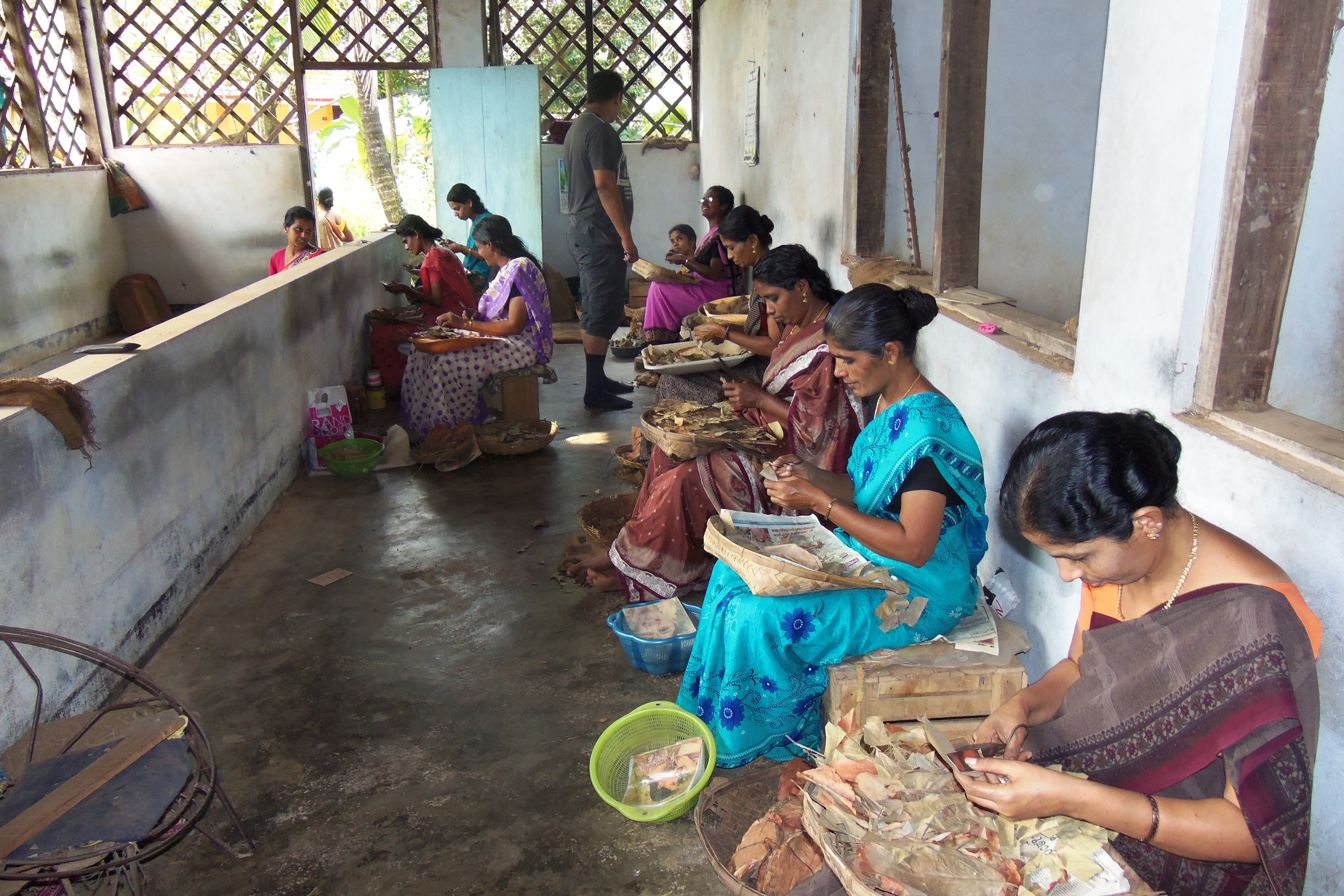
Factory workers hand-cut the leaves using scissors and a metal stencil guide. After cutting a sufficient number of wrappers, they will move on to roll approximately 1,000 beedies each per day.

Over 3 million Indians are employed in the manufacture of beedies, a cottage industry that is typically done by women in their homes. Analysis of bidi industry in India found that in spite of increase in profits worker wages declined and female workers were paid substantially less than male workers.

Workers roll an average of 500–1000 beedies daily, handling 225–450 grams (8–15 3/4 oz) of tobacco flake. Handling tobacco and inhaling its dust is an occupational hazard for beedi workers, as an increased level of chromosome aberrations was found in a scientific study.

The production of beedies is also popular in Bangladesh. According to the 2014 List of Goods Produced by Child Labor or Forced Labor published by the Bureau of International Labor Affairs, the informal sector in these countries employs underage children in the production of beedies "in response to consumer preferences".

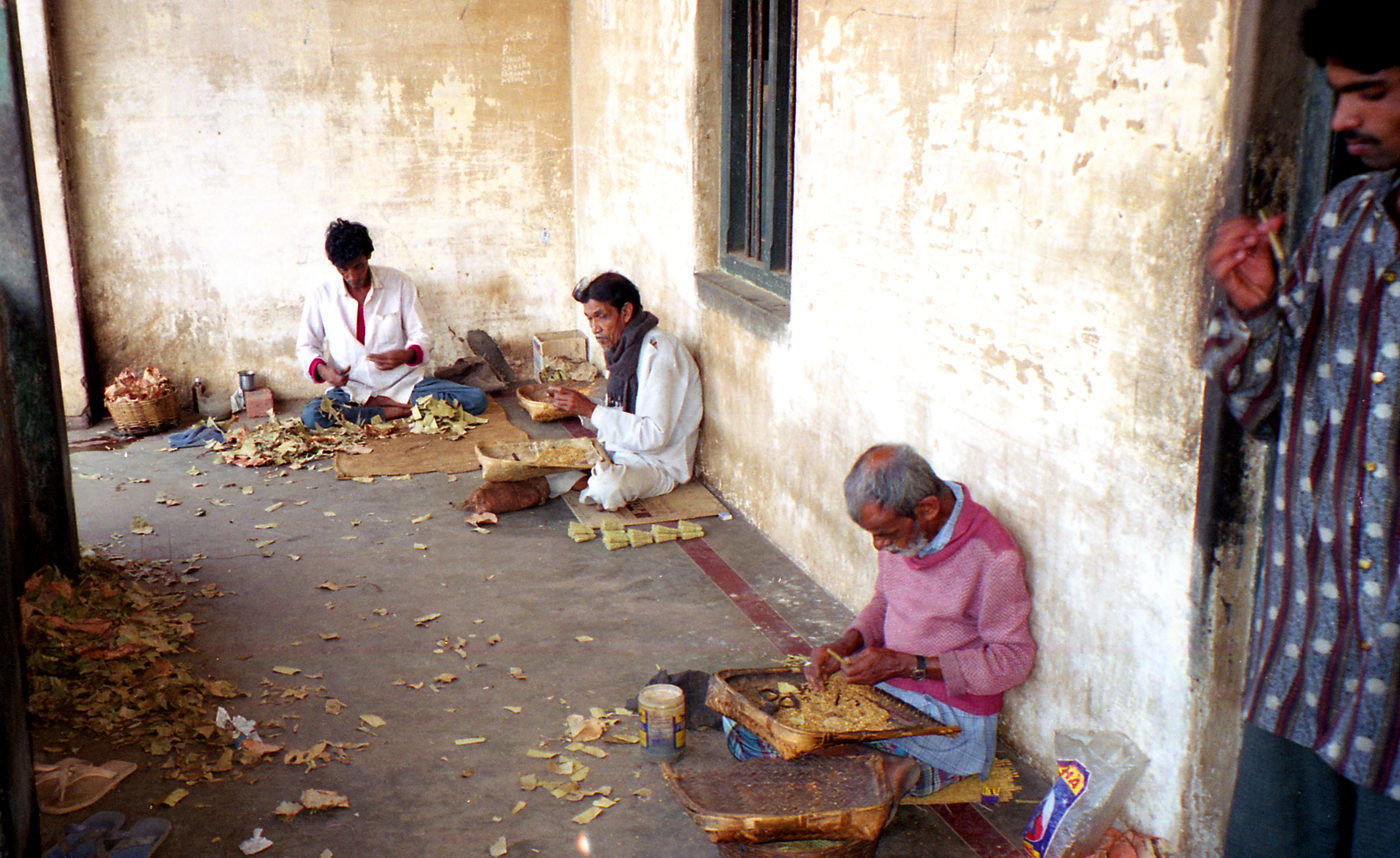
Informal sector making beedi.

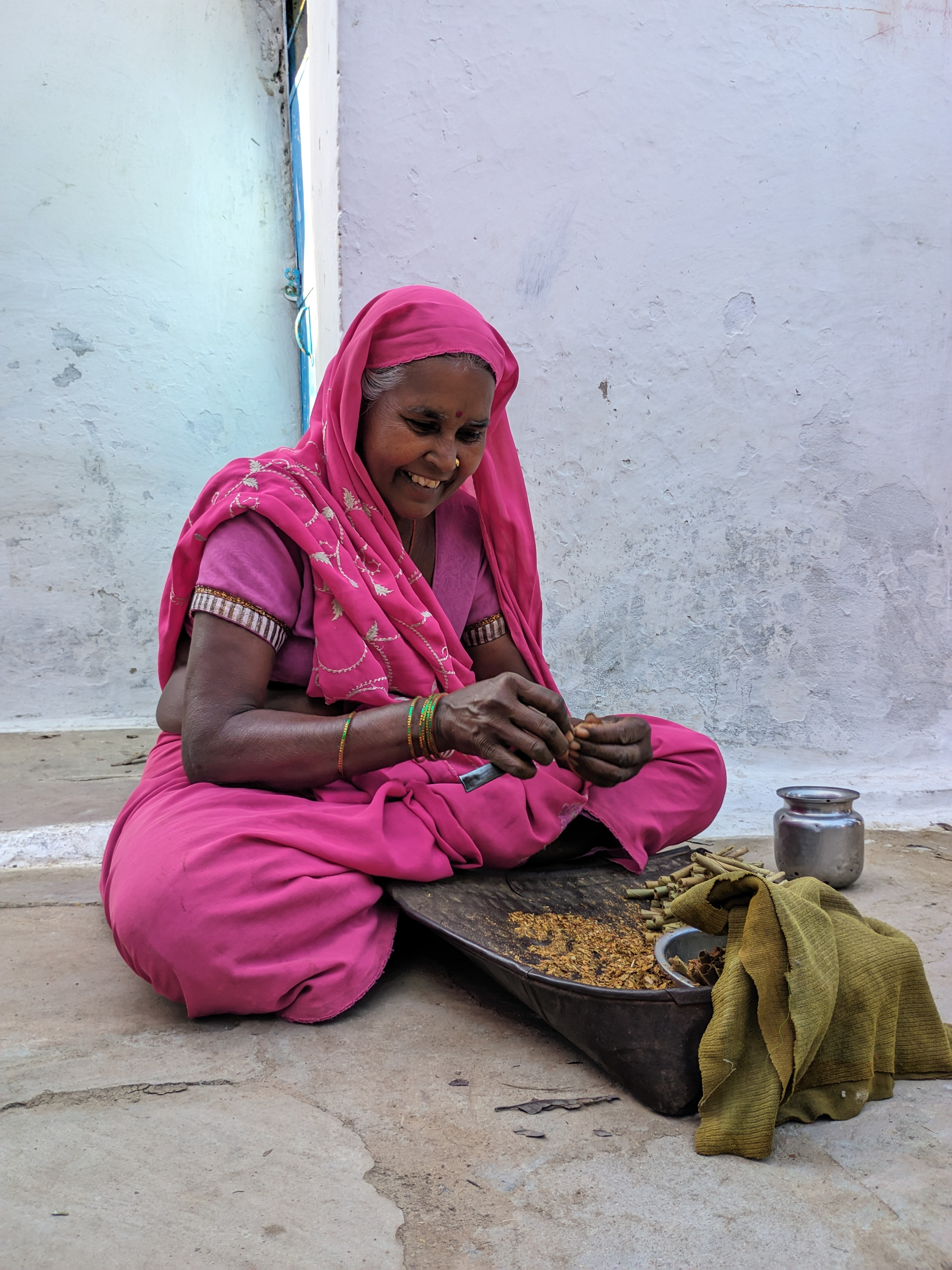
Women Crafting Handmade Beedi in Chanderi

=== Tendu leaf ===
Tendu (Diospyros melanoxylon) leaves make excellent wrappers, and the success of the beedi is due, in part, to this leaf. The leaves are in abundance shortly after the tobacco crop is cured, and so are ready to be used in beedi manufacture. Collected in the summer and made into bundles, the leaves are dried in the sun for three to six days before being used as wrappers.

== Global popularity ==
Beedies, unlike cigarettes, must be drawn frequently to keep them lit, and doing so requires effort.

=== North America ===
In the United States, beedis are treated like conventional cigarettes. They are taxed at the same rates, are required to have a tax stamp, and must carry the Surgeon General's warning. However, a study done in San Francisco showed that about four in ten packs of beedis did not contain the required warning label and seven in ten did not carry the tax stamp. Some beedis are flavoured. Both Canada and the US have banned flavoured cigarettes.

=== United Kingdom ===
Beedis are currently legal in the UK and are subject to the same taxation as cigarettes. One must be aged 18 or over to purchase them.

== Health warnings ==
Beedies deliver more nicotine, carbon monoxide, and tar, and carry a greater risk of oral cancers, than conventional cigarettes. As with many other types of smoking, beedies increase the risk of certain kinds of cancers, heart disease, and lung disease. They may also be more harmful than other forms of tobacco consumption.

The frequency of ventilatory abnormalities was highest in the cigarette smokers. A lower prevalence of chronic bronchitis and abnormal ventilatory measurements in beedi smokers, as compared with cigarette smokers, was thought to be primarily due to low total consumption of tobacco. Some added influence of smoke produced by burning the wrapper leaf and the type of tobacco used in beedies could not be ruled out.

== See also ==
- Gutka
- Paan
- Kretek
- Cheroot
- Cigar
