= Arjunpur (disambiguation) =

Arjunpur is a town in West Bengal, India.

Arjunpur may also refer to the following places in India:

- Arjunpur (Bilhaur), a village in Kanpur Nagar district, Uttar Pradesh
- Arjunpur, Lucknow, a village in Uttar Pradesh
- Arjunpur, Mainpuri, a village in Uttar Pradesh
