= Bangaon (disambiguation) =

Bangaon is a municipality in North 24 Parganas district of West Bengal, India.

Bangaon may also refer to:

== West Bengal ==
- Bangaon (community development block)
- Bangaon (Lok Sabha constituency)
- Bangaon Uttar (Vidhan Sabha constituency)
- Bangaon Dakshin (Vidhan Sabha constituency)
- Bongaon High School, a higher secondary school at Bangaon
- Bangaon railway station, a railway station of Bangaon
- Bangaon subdivision

== Others ==
- Bangaon (Kamrup), Assam, India
- Bangaon, Bihar, a village in the Saharsa district of Bihar, India
- Bangaon, Lucknow, a village in Uttar Pradesh, India
- Bongram, a village in the Gopalganj District, Bangladesh
