= Kathwara, Lucknow =

Village in Uttar Pradesh, India

Kathwara Kathwāra
- Village
- Location in Uttar Pradesh, India Kathwara (India)
- Coordinates: 27.01795°N 80.84873°E
- Country: India
- State: Uttar Pradesh
- District: Lucknow

Area
  - Total: 12.953 km^{2} (5.001 sq mi)
- Elevation: 124 m (407 ft)

Population (2011)
  - Total: 6,740
  - Density: 520/km^{2} (1,350/sq mi)

Languages
  - Official: Hindi
- Time zone: UTC+5:30 (IST)

Kathwara is a large village in Bakshi Ka Talab block of Lucknow district, Uttar Pradesh, India. As of 2011, its population is 6,740, in 1,303 households. Kathwara is a village with a long history, with legendary origins said to date back to the Dvapara Yuga, and it is the site of the Chandrika Devi Temple.

== History ==
Kathwara's origin myth states that the place was once ruled by one Daiyat Hansan Dhuj; when Arjuna set a horse loose as part of the Ashvamedha ritual horse-sacrifice, Hansan seized it, and Arjuna led an army to meet him in battle. The place where the two armies fought was then dubbed Katak-wasa, or "the meeting of the armies", and has retained that name ever since. According to this legend, before the battle took place, Hansan had prepared a large cauldron with boiling oil and threatened that if any of his soldiers hesitated in mustering at the battlefield, he would throw them in to be boiled alive. However, ironically, it was his son, Sadhanand, who was late to arrive, having stayed behind one more day at the urging of his wife. Sadhanand was thrown into the cauldron but, miraculously, he was not harmed. This episode is said to have happened at the nearby hamlet of Chandanpur.

Local tradition maintains that the Bhars then ruled the area, and then after them the Kurmis, who had a strong fort at Kathwara. Then, around 1400, two Chauhan brothers, Acharaj and Bacharaj, came from Mainpuri, defeated the last Kurmi king, Rai Dhandhu, and established themselves as rulers of the area. Kathwara then served as the seat of a powerful Chauhan estate until modern times. The estate holders often caused trouble for the Nawabs of Awadh; for example in 1851 when they refused to pay revenue to the king, leading to the chakladar Khan Ali Khan leading a royal army to subjugate them. The Kathwara estate comprised 32 villages in 1866, but it declined in subsequent years, and by the turn of the 20th century it had dwindled to just the single village of Kathwara. Around that time, Kathwara was described as a large village in the western part of the pargana of Mahona, almost completely surrounded by orchards. To the south of Kathwara, the Gomti banks were described as being scored by many deep ravines.
