= Bareilly–Pilibheet Provincial State Railway =

Railways

- Industry: Railways
- Predecessor: none
- Founded: 1884; 142 years ago
- Defunct: 1 January 1891; 135 years ago
- Successor: Lucknow–Bareilly Railway
- Headquarters: India
- Area served: Northern India
- Services: Rail transport

Bareilly–Pilibheet Provincial State Railway was owned by the Provincial Government and worked by the Rohilkund and Kumaon Railway.

== History ==
Two metre gauge sections were built to form the Bareilly–Pilibheet Provincial State Railway; Bhojeepura to Bareilly (12 miles) opened 1 October 1884, and Pilibhit to Bhojeepura (24 miles) opened 15 November 1884. It merged with the Lucknow–Sitapur–Seramow Provincial State Railway to become the Lucknow–Bareilly Railway on 1 January 1891.

== Conversion to broad gauge ==
The railway lines were converted to 1,676 mm (5 ft 6 in) broad gauge in 2017.
