= Motab Shaikh =

Indian politician

Deputy Leader of Congress Legislative Party, West Bengal
- Incumbent
- Assumed office 20 June 2026
- Leader: Julfikar Ali

Member of the West Bengal Legislative Assembly
- Incumbent
- Assumed office May 2026
- Preceded by: Manirul Islam
- Constituency: Farakka

Personal details
- Party: INC
- Spouse: Suro Bibi
- Parent: Ejabul Shaikh
- Profession: Politician, Businessman

Motab Shaikh (Bengali: মোতাব শেখ) is an Indian politician from Tildanga, West Bengal. He is a member of West Bengal Legislative Assembly from Farakka Assembly constituency in Murshidabad district. He is a member of Indian National Congress.

== Early life and education ==
Shaikh is from Tildanga, Farakka, Murshidabad district of West Bengal. He is the son of Ejabul Shaikh. He studied at Tildanga High School and passed Class 8 in 1983. He runs his own business. He declared assets worth Rs.17 crore in his affidavit to the Election Commission of India.

== Career ==
Shaik won the Farakka Assembly constituency representing the Indian National Congress in the 2026 West Bengal Legislative Assembly election. He defeated Sunil Chowdhuri of the Bharatiya Janata Party by a margin of 8,193 votes. Initially, his name was deleted in electoral rolls, in the Special Intensive Revision (SIR) of electoral rolls but later he was restored as a voter.

== Electoral performance ==
West Bengal Legislative Assembly
| Year | Constituency | Party | Votes | % | Opponent | Party | Votes | % | Margin | Result |
|---|---|---|---|---|---|---|---|---|---|---|
| 2026 | Farakka | INC | 63,050 | 36.06 | Sunil Chowdhuri | BJP | 54,857 | 31.38 | 8,193 | Won |

== See also ==
- 2026 West Bengal Legislative Assembly election
- List of chief ministers of West Bengal
- West Bengal Legislative Assembly
