= Paharpur =

Paharpur may refer to:

- Paharpur, Khyber Pakhtunkhwa, a town and tehsil headquarters in Khyber Pakhtunkhwa, Pakistan
- Paharpur Tehsil, Khyber Pakhtunkhwa, Pakistan
- Paharpur, India, a census town Gaya district in the Indian state of Bihar
- Paharpur, Naogaon, in Badalgachhi Upazila, Bangladesh
  - Somapura Mahavihara, an ancient Buddhist monastery and UNESCO World Heritage site at Paharpur, Badalgachhi Upazila
- Pundranagar, also Paharpur, capital of the ancient kingdom of Pundravardhana in Bengal, now an archaeological site in Bogra, Bangladesh
- Paharpur, Sylhet, in Ajmiriganj Upazila, Bangladesh
- Paharpur, Bakshi Ka Talab, a village in Uttar Pradesh, India
- Paharpur, Malihabad, a village in Uttar Pradesh, India
- Paharpur, Firozabad, a village in Uttar Pradesh, India
- Paharpur, kawakol, a village in Bihar, India
- Paharpur, Jalpaiguri, a village in Jalpaiguri district, West Bengal, India
