= Delhi Public School, Azad Nagar =

Private school in Uttar Pradesh, India

Delhi Public School, Azaad Nagar
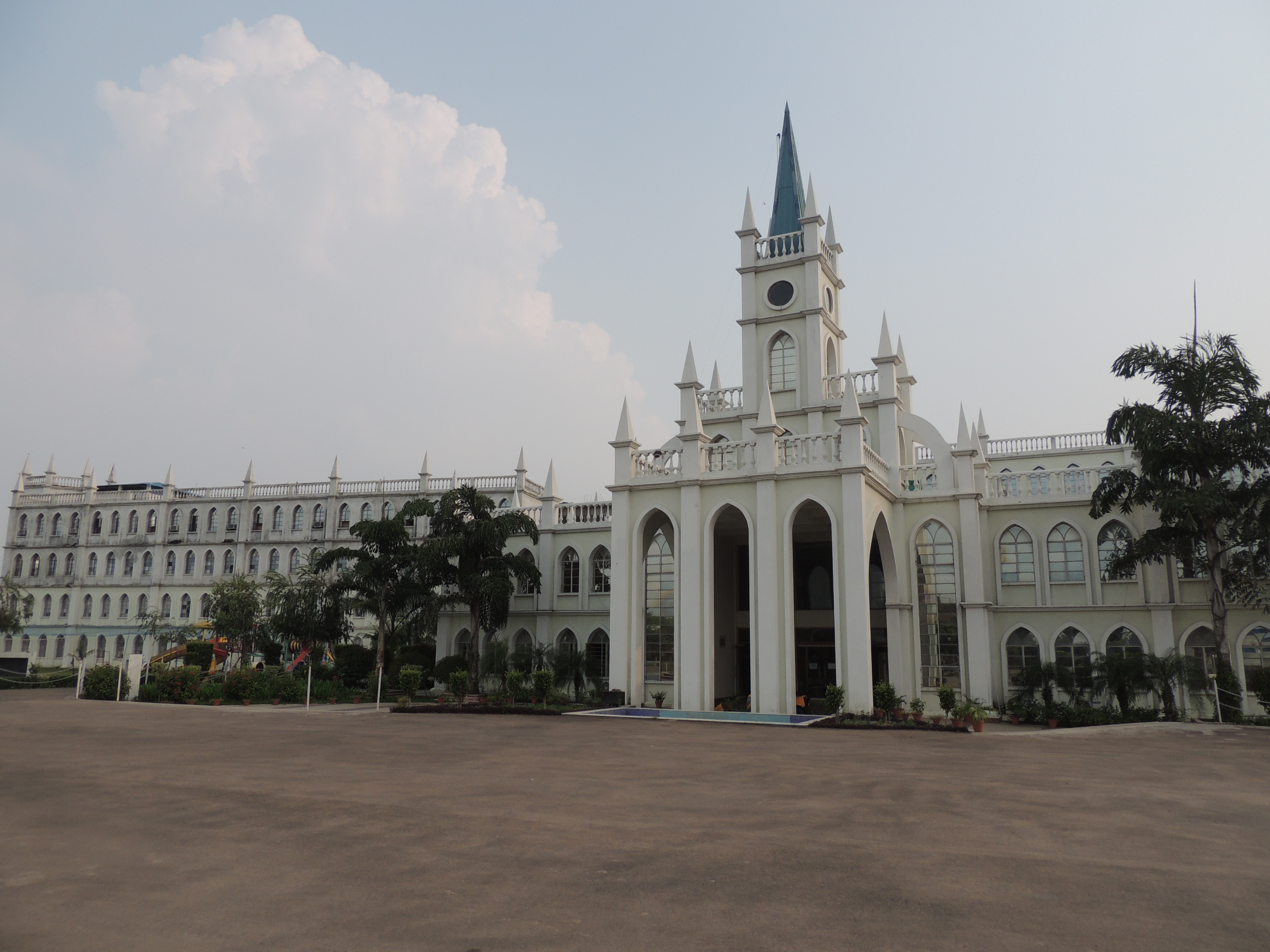

Location
- Azaad Nagar, Kanpur, Uttar Pradesh; India; 26.5089°N 80.2916°E

Information
- Type: Private school
- Motto: Service Before Self
- Established: 2004; 22 years ago
- Founder: Mr. Alok Misra
- Principal: Mrs.Shilpa Manish
- Enrollment: 3000
- Campus: Urban
- Colour
- Affiliations: Central Board of Secondary Education; Delhi Public School Society
- Acronym: DPS
- Website: dpsazaadnagar.com

Delhi Public School Azaad Nagar in Kanpur is a private school operating under the aegis of the Delhi Public School Society, New Delhi. It is a senior secondary school affiliated with the Central Board of Secondary Education (CBSE), New Delhi.

== History ==
The first Delhi Public School in Kanpur was established at Servodaya Nagar in 1997. However, as the students of the primary school grew older and their need for holistic development expanded, the management felt the need for larger premises for the senior school. Consequently, DPS Azaad Nagar was established as an institution on Mainawati Marg, on a vast expanse of land. The founder Headmistress of DPS Servodaya Nagar, Rachna Mohotra, became the Principal of the Senior School at DPS Azaad Nagar. DPS Servodaya Nagar continues to function as a feeder school for DPS Azaad Nagar under the supervision and guidance of its Headmistress, Anju Verma.

== Campus ==
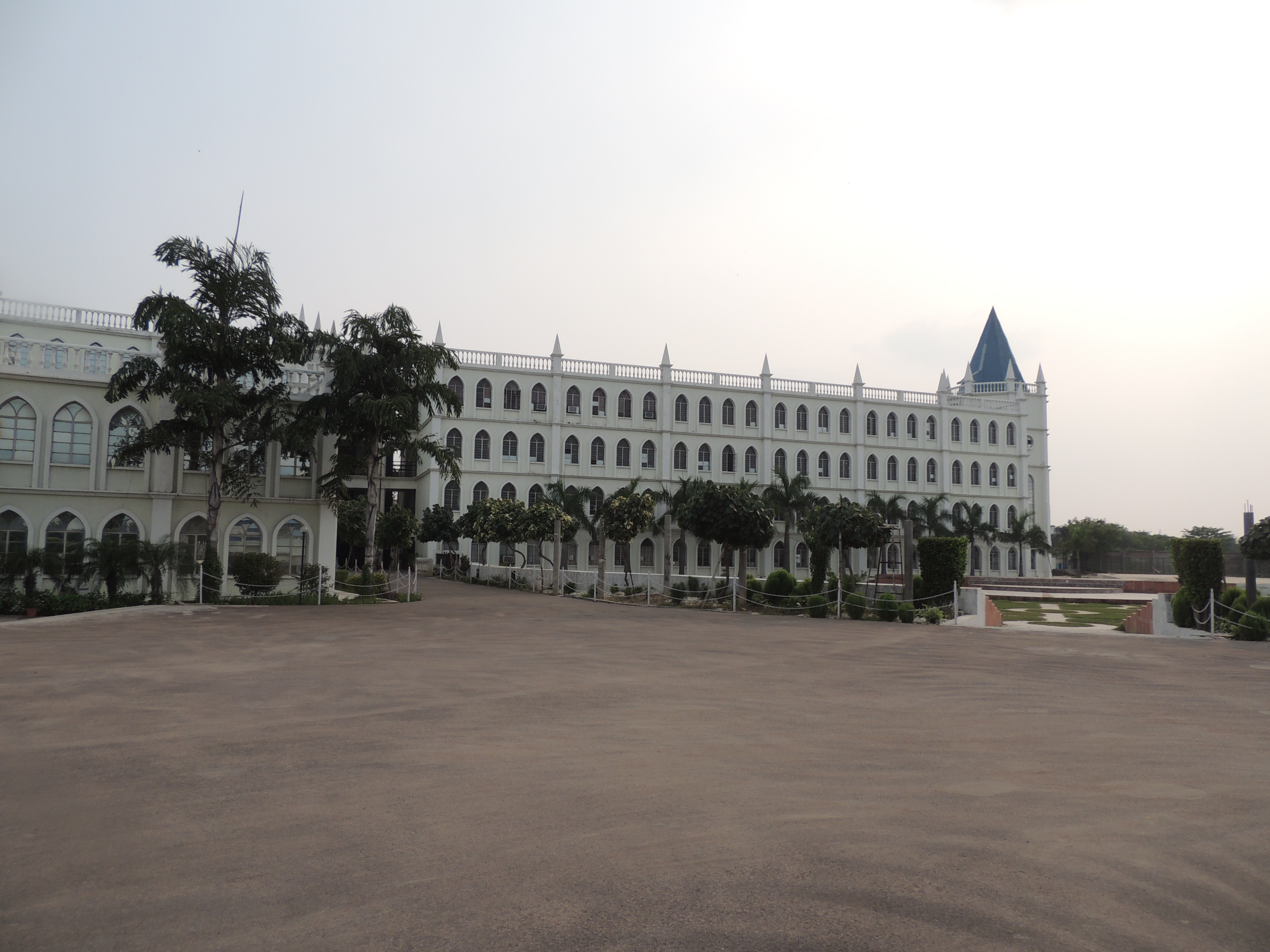
Delhi Public School Azaad Nagar

Delhi Public School Azaad Nagar is located on a green 20-acre campus. It is a co-educational day and boarding school with more than 3,000 students. The school consists of an administrative block and three academic blocks. The primary block accommodates classes from playgroup to class V, while the middle block houses classes VI to VIII. The senior block consists of classes IX to XII, offering streams in science, commerce, and the humanities. Additionally, the school includes separate, air-conditioned boys' and girls' hostels, each headed by male and female wardens, respectively. The school's infrastructure also features an amphitheater, a multipurpose hall, a floodlit playground, a gymnasium, a shooting range, and an Olympic-sized swimming pool.

The academic facilities at DPS Azaad Nagar include computer, physics, chemistry, biology, language, and mathematics laboratories, as well as a well-equipped library. Junior students have a separate science room and computer lab. To encourage and foster extracurricular activities, the school provides separate classrooms for music, dance, theatre, and fine arts.

== Academic achievements ==
DPS Azaad Nagar has achieved a 100% success rate since the first Class X and XII board results since 2017. The school has also earned numerous accolades in academic, sports, dance, music, and theatrical events at various inter-DPS, inter-school, and national competitions. Although DPS Azaad Nagar is a relatively young school, its alumni association boasts engineers, doctors, designers, lawyers, and aspiring IAS officers.

- Arjav Jain of Delhi Public School, Azaad Nagar being awarded National Bal Shree Honour by Honorable HRD Minister Smriti Irani

== See also ==
- Delhi Public School Society
- List of schools in Kanpur
- DPS Barra
