= Mamrejpur =

- Census Town
- Location in West Bengal, India Mamrejpur (India)
- Coordinates: 24.6986°N 87.9163°E
- Country: India
- State: West Bengal
- District: Murshidabad

Area
  - Total: 4.7072 km^{2} (1.8175 sq mi)
- Elevation: 12 m (39 ft)

Population (2011)
  - Total: 9,851
  - Density: 2,093/km^{2} (5,420/sq mi)

Languages
  - Official: Bengali, English
- Time zone: UTC+5:30 (IST)
- PIN: 742202
- Vehicle registration: WB
- Lok Sabha constituency: Maldaha Dakshin
- Vidhan Sabha constituency: Farakka
- Website: murshidabad.nic.in

Mamrejpur (also spelled Memrejpur) is a census town in the Farakka CD block in the Jangipur subdivision of the Murshidabad district in the state of West Bengal, India.

== Geography ==
Cities, towns and locations in the northern portion of Jangipur subdivision, Murshidabad district (including Farakka, Samserganj, Suti II CD blocks)
M: municipal town, CT: census town, R: rural/ urban centre, F: Facility
Abbreviation- TPS: Thermal Power Station
Owing to space constraints in the small map, the actual locations in a larger map may vary slightly

=== Location ===
Mamrejpur is located at 24.6986°N 87.9163°E.

According to the map of Farakka CD block in the District Census Handbook, Murshidabad, Arjunpur, Sibnagar, Pranpara, Mamrejpur and Mahadeb Nagar form a cluster of census towns.

=== Area overview ===
Jangipur subdivision is crowded with 52 census towns and as such it had to be presented in two location maps. One of the maps can be seen alongside. The subdivision is located in the Rarh region that is spread over from adjoining Santhal Pargana division of Jharkhand. The land is slightly higher in altitude than the surrounding plains and is gently undulating. The river Ganges, along with its distributaries, is prominent in both the maps. At the head of the subdivision is the 2,245 m long Farakka Barrage, one of the largest projects of its kind in the country. Murshidabad district shares with Bangladesh a porous international border which is notoriously crime prone (partly shown in this map). The subdivision has two large power plants - the 2,100 MW Farakka Super Thermal Power Station and the 1,600 MW Sagardighi Thermal Power Station. According to a 2016 report, there are around 1,000,000 (1 million/ ten lakh) workers engaged in the beedi industry in Jangipur subdivision. 90% are home-based and 70% of the home-based workers are women. As of 2013, an estimated 2.4 million people reside along the banks of the Ganges alone in Murshidabad district. Severe erosion occurs along the banks.

Note: The two maps present some of the notable locations in the subdivision. All places marked in the maps are linked in the larger full screen maps.

== Demographics ==
According to the 2011 Census of India, Mamrejpur had a total population of 9,851, of which 4,961 (50%) were males and 4,890 (50%) were females. Population in the age range 0–6 years was 1,926. The total number of literate persons in Mamrejpur was 4,507 (56.87% of the population over 6 years).

== Infrastructure ==
According to the District Census Handbook, Murshidabad, 2011, Memrejpur covered an area of 4.7072 km^{2}. The protected water-supply involved overhead tank, hand pump, tube well/ borewell. It had 480 domestic electric connections. Among the medical facilities it had 1 dispensary/ health centre, 1 family welfare centre, 1 maternity & child welfare centre, 1 maternity home, 1 veterinary hospital. Among the educational facilities, it had 10 primary schools, 1 secondary school, 1 senior secondary school, the nearest general degree college at Farakka 10 km away. Among the social, cultural and recreational facilities it had 2 public libraries. It had the branch offices of 1 nationalised bank, 1 cooperative bank, 10 agricultural credit societies.

== Healthcare ==
Farakka CD block is one of the areas of Murshidabad district where ground water is affected by a high level of arsenic contamination. The WHO guideline for arsenic in drinking water is 10 mg/ litre, and the Indian Standard value is 50 mg/ litre. The maximum concentration in Farakka CD block is 150 mg/litre.
