= Badshahnagar railway station =

Railway station in Uttar Pradesh, India

Badshahnagar Railway Station

General information
- Location: Badshah Nagar, Balmiki Nagar, Lucknow, Uttar Pradesh, India
- Coordinates: 26.8693°N 80.9610°E
- Elevation: 123.500 m (405.18 ft)
- System
- Owner: Indian Railways
- Lines: Barabanki–Lucknow Suburban Railway; Lucknow Junction–Faizabad; Lucknow Junction–Gonda–Balrampur
- Platforms: 3
- Tracks: 4
- Connections: Red Line Badshahnagar

Construction
- Structure type: At grade
- Parking: Available
- Cycle facilities: Available

Other information
- Station code: BNZ
- Zone(s): North Eastern Railway
- Division(s): Lucknow NER
- Fare zone: Northern Eastern Railway, Lucknow NER railway division

History
- Opened: 1940

Passengers
- 68,000 approx
Location

Badshahnagar railway station is a very important railway station on the Barabanki–Lucknow Suburban Railway. It serves the Badshah Nagar locality of Indira Nagar. The station is located in a very densely populated area; thus, it handles a large amount of traffic. The number of platforms, however, can not be increased due to lack of space. The railway management has provided many services, added a new entrance from Platform 3 side and added facilities to cope up with traffic. Earlier a few trains like Gorakhpur Intercity Express used to originate / terminate here, but now it has been cancelled. Since this is small station with 3 platforms, it is now completely saturated with trains and railway is now compelled to develop Gomti Nagar as a terminal station.

== Culture ==
It is also known for hosting the Durga Puja celebrations every year, organised by the Badshah Nagar Durga Puja committee. It is the oldest & one of the biggest pujas of Trans-Gomti area & is being held regularly since 1956.

== Trains from Badshahnagar ==
Currently 41 trains pass through, 1 originates and 1 terminate at this station. This makes it a very important railway station in Lucknow city. It handles a large amount of passenger pressure. Trains originating /terminating here-

Train no.	Train name	from	to
15070	Badshahnagar–Gorakhpur Express	Badshahnagar	Gorakhpur Junction
15069	Gorakhpur–Badshahnagar Express	Gorakhpur Junction	Badshahnagar

Some of important trains passing through this station are

Train no.	Train name	Type
15007	Krishak Express	Express
12530	Lucknow–Pataliputra Express	Superfast
18191	Utsarg Express	Express
13020	Bagh Express	Express
05065	Chhapra–Lucknow Jn	Express
19037	Avadh Express	Express
12590	Secunderabad–Gorakhpur Express	Superfast
12592	Yeshwantpur–Gorakhpur Express	Superfast
12521	Raptisagar Express	Superfast
15046	Okha–Gorakhpur Express	Express

== MEMU services from this station ==
From	TO	Type
Lucknow Junction	Barabanki Jn	MEMU
Kanpur Central	Barabanki Jn	MEMU
Lucknow Junction	Gonda Jn	DEMU (proposed)
Lucknow Junction	Sitapur Cantt	MEMU (proposed)
