= Pranpara =

- Census Town
- Location in West Bengal, India Pranpara (India)
- Coordinates: 24.7046°N 87.9383°E
- Country: India
- State: West Bengal
- District: Murshidabad

Area
  - Total: 5.6622 km^{2} (2.1862 sq mi)
- Elevation: 12 m (39 ft)

Population (2011)
  - Total: 22,297
  - Density: 3,937.9/km^{2} (10,199/sq mi)

Languages
  - Official: Bengali, English
- Time zone: UTC+5:30 (IST)
- PIN: 742202
- Vehicle registration: WB
- Lok Sabha constituency: Maldaha Dakshin
- Vidhan Sabha constituency: Farakka
- Website: murshidabad.nic.in

Pranpara is a census town in the Farakka CD block in the Jangipur subdivision of the Murshidabad district in the state of West Bengal, India.

== Geography ==
Cities, towns and locations in the northern portion of Jangipur subdivision, Murshidabad district (including Farakka, Samserganj, Suti II CD blocks)
M: municipal town, CT: census town, R: rural/ urban centre, F: Facility
Abbreviation- TPS: Thermal Power Station
Owing to space constraints in the small map, the actual locations in a larger map may vary slightly

=== Location ===
Pranpara is located at 24.7046°N 87.9383°E.

According to the map of Farakka CD block in the District Census Handbook, Murshidabad, Arjunpur, Sibnagar, Pranpara, Mamrejpur and Mahadeb Nagar form a cluster of census towns.

=== Area overview ===
Jangipur subdivision is crowded with 52 census towns and as such it had to be presented in two location maps. One of the maps can be seen alongside. The subdivision is located in the Rarh region that is spread over from adjoining Santhal Pargana division of Jharkhand. The land is slightly higher in altitude than the surrounding plains and is gently undulating. The river Ganges, along with its distributaries, is prominent in both the maps. At the head of the subdivision is the 2,245 m long Farakka Barrage, one of the largest projects of its kind in the country. Murshidabad district shares with Bangladesh a porous international border which is notoriously crime prone (partly shown in this map). The subdivision has two large power plants - the 2,100 MW Farakka Super Thermal Power Station and the 1,600 MW Sagardighi Thermal Power Station. According to a 2016 report, there are around 1,000,000 (1 million/ ten lakh) workers engaged in the beedi industry in Jangipur subdivision. 90% are home-based and 70% of the home-based workers are women. As of 2013, an estimated 2.4 million people reside along the banks of the Ganges alone in Murshidabad district. Severe erosion occurs along the banks.

Note: The two maps present some of the notable locations in the subdivision. All places marked in the maps are linked in the larger full screen maps.

== Demographics ==
According to the 2011 Census of India, Pranpara had a total population of 22,297, of which 11,181 (50%) were males and 11,116 (50%) were females. Population in the age range 0–6 years was 4,625. The total number of literate persons in Pranpara was 9,408 (53.24% of the population over 6 years).

== Infrastructure ==
According to the District Census Handbook, Murshidabad, 2011, Paranpara covered an area of 5.6622 km^{2}. had 2 km roads. The protected water-supply involved overhead tank, hand pump, tube well/ borewell. It had 160 domestic electric connections. Among the medical facilities it had 1 medicine shop. Among the educational facilities, it had 1 primary school, other school facilities at Arjunpur 5 km away. It produced beedi, handloom products, molasses.

== Healthcare ==
Farakka CD block is one of the areas of Murshidabad district where ground water is affected by a high level of arsenic contamination. The WHO guideline for arsenic in drinking water is 10 mg/ litre, and the Indian Standard value is 50 mg/ litre. The maximum concentration in Farakka CD block is 150 mg/litre.
