= Mainul Haque =

Indian politician (1963–2025)

Mainul Haque (1963 – 2 November 2025) was an Indian politician from West Bengal. He was a five-time consecutive member of the West Bengal Legislative Assembly from Farakka Assembly constituency in Murshidabad district. He won the 2016 West Bengal Legislative Assembly election representing the Indian National Congress.

== Early life and education ==
Haque was born in 1963, and came from Farakka, Murshidabad district, West Bengal. He was the son of the late Saiyab Sheikh. He studied Class 10 at Tildanga High School and passed the Madhyamak examinations in 1979. He did farming and his wife runs her own business.

== Career ==
Haque won from the Farakka Assembly constituency representing the Indian National Congress in the 2016 West Bengal Legislative Assembly election. He polled 83,314 votes and defeated his nearest rival, Md. Mustafa of the All India Trinamool Congress, by a margin of 28,167 votes. He first became an MLA winning the 1996 West Bengal Legislative Assembly election, defeating Abul Hasnat Khan of the Communist Party of India (Marxist). He won the 2001 West Bengal Legislative Assembly election to retain the seat for the Congress Party defeating, Mir Tarekul Islam, also of CPI (M). He became an MLA for the third time winning the 2006 West Bengal Legislative Assembly election defeating Abdus Salam, also of CPI (M). In 2011 West Bengal Legislative Assembly election, he once again defeated Abdus Salam. Thus from 1996 onward, he won five consecutive elections till 2016 and his winning streak came to an end in the 2021 Assembly election, which he lost to Manirul Islam of the All India Trinamool Congress.

== Death ==
Haque died from a cardiac arrest on 2 November 2025, at the age of 62.
