= Bakshi Ka Talab =

Bakshi Ka Talab Bakshi, BKT, Afs
- Residential area
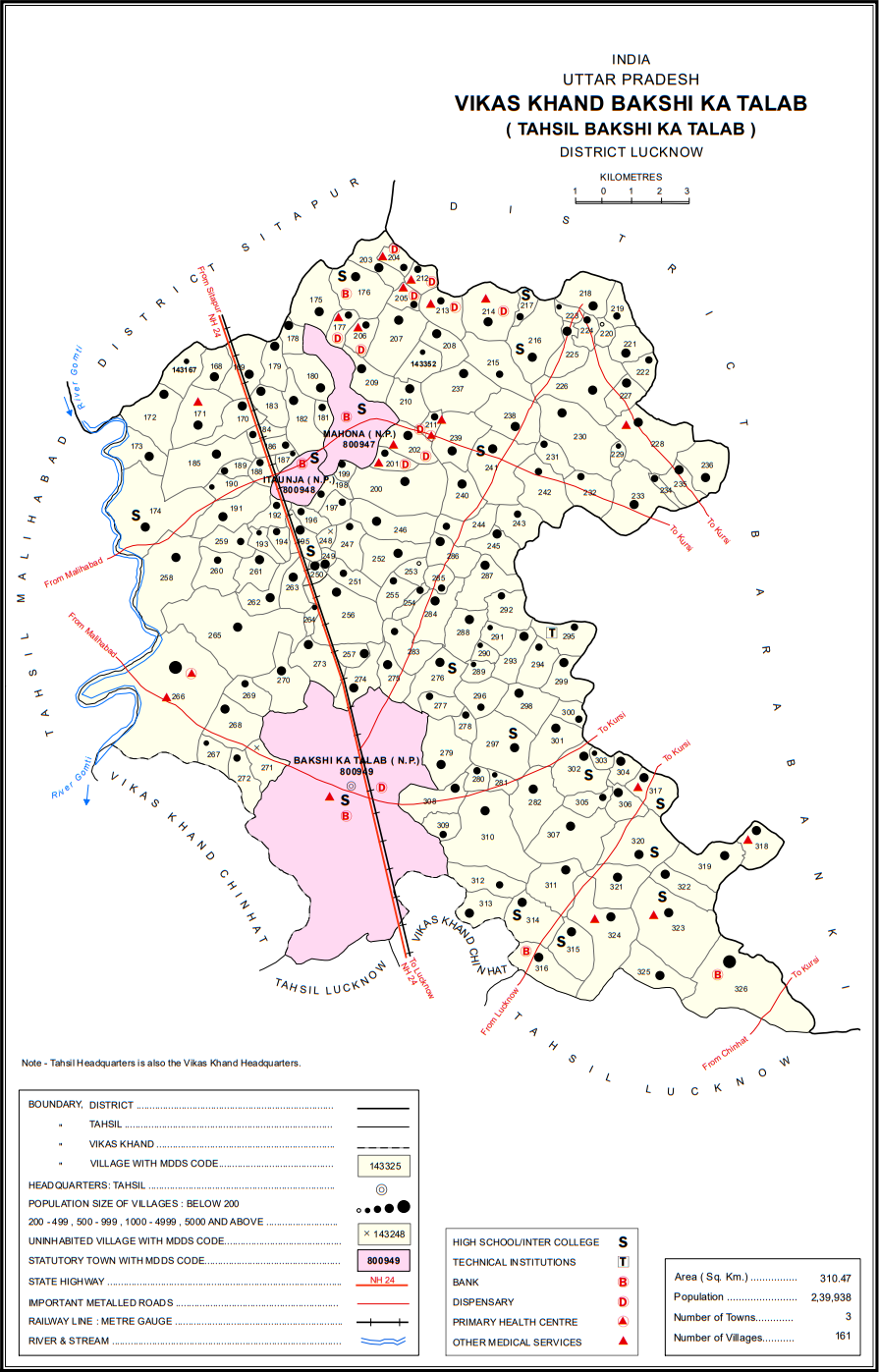
- Map of Bakshi Ka Talab CD block

- Location in Uttar Pradesh, India
- Coordinates: 26°59′0″N 80°53′0″E
- Country: India
- State: Uttar Pradesh
- District: Lucknow

Area
  - Total: 41.9 km^{2} (16.2 sq mi)
- Elevation: 124 m (407 ft)

Population (2011)
  - Total: 49,166
  - Density: 1,170/km^{2} (3,040/sq mi)

Languages
  - Official: Hindi
- Time zone: UTC+5:30 (IST)
- PIN: 226201
- Vehicle registration: UP-32
- Coastline: 0 kilometres (0 mi)
- Nearest city: Lucknow
- Lok Sabha constituency 169: 0

Bakshi Ka Talab is a nagar panchayat town in Lucknow district of Uttar Pradesh, India. It is also the headquarters of a corresponding tehsil, as well as a community development block of the same name. As of 2011, its population was 49,166, in 8,728 households. It consists of both residential and business settlements. Bakshi Ka Talab is an organised settlement developed by Lucknow Development Authority (LDA).

== Name and history ==
Bakshi Ka Talab is named after its large tank built by Bakhshi Tipur Chand, who was paymaster for Nasir-ud-Din Haidar Shah in the first half of the 19th century. This structure was built with flights of stairs descending to the water's surface on all four sides, and four towers marking the corners. A temple to Banke Bihari was built facing the main road, and next to it, Bakhshi Tipur Chand had a mansion built, along with a walled garden. By the turn of the 20th century, the complex had fallen into ruin. Around that time, Bakshi Ka Talab was described as being within the land belonging to Rudahi village, to the west. It had a train station on the Lucknow–Bareilly Railway, a post office, and a village school.

Bakshi Ka Talab was first upgraded to nagar panchayat status for the 2011 Census, with 23 villages being merged into the territory of the city.

== Demographics ==
As of 2011, the population of Bakshi Ka Talab town was 49,166, in 8,728 households. Children ages 0-6 numbered 6,783, making up 13.8% of the town's population. The town's sex ratio was 910 females for every 1000 males; in the 0-6 age group it was 947. Members of scheduled castes made up 30.2% of town residents (the highest among cities in Lucknow district), and no residents were recorded as belonging to scheduled tribes. The literacy rate of Bakshi Ka Talab town was 73.8% (81.7% of males and 65.3% of females, ages 7 and up).

At the block level, the population of Bakshi Ka Talab's rural areas was 239,938, which was the highest among blocks in Lucknow district.

== Villages ==
Bakshi Ka Talab block contains the following 161 villages:

Village name	Total land area (hectares)	Population (in 2011)
Sahadat Nagar	118.4	243
Garha	127.8	1,139
Bahargaon	254.8	2,340
Karaundi	273.2	1,567
Bagaha	287.4	2,917
Jamkhanava	283.7	1,900
Dudhara	112	1,757
Makaria Kalan	710.5	3,441
Aramba	261.3	2,459
Banauga	244	3,876
Bhagautipur	116.1	833
Sarai Damu	136.8	1,081
Shivari	150	1,536
Gohana Khurd	180.8	1,443
Bahadurganj	64.3	749
Chaugava	226.2	2,097
Lodhauli	130.6	1,075
Manpur Raja	42.4	748
Malookpur	253.5	2,203
Belava	94	829
Saray Usrana	38.7	493
Madhopur	95.9	748
Marapa	56.2	599
Gorahi	64.1	443
Raipur Raja	236.7	1,920
Bangaon	77.3	730
Kamalpur Kayastha	46.6	277
Palpur	62	921
Chandpur Khanipur	195.1	2,781
Derava	42.8	622
Ahmedpur Khera	102.8	890
Pirthi Nagar	59.5	774
Akbarpur	40.3	676
Usarana	466.4	2,770
Karsanda	166.6	574
Kishunpur	186.5	1,210
Dilvasi	163.2	1,132
Patti	78.9	755
Khanpur	57.3	771
Bhatesua	106.2	777
Atesua	420.2	3,290
Hanumantpur	139.8	1,449
Chandanapur	166.6	1,267
Ashnaha	169.2	1,443
Bhikharipur	56.4	588
Lalpur	80.6	695
Shahpur Najol	188.6	634
Kunaura	575.6	1,503
Umariya	257.3	732
Muspipari	325.4	2,149
Himmatpur	64.3	545
Godhana	314.2	1,191
Narayanpur	84.7	524
Kuverpur	44.3	193
Puhuppur	150.8	1,002
Subanshipur	75.7	730
Haloopur	49.6	312
Rampur Babu	78.9	727
Bhargahana	151.9	1,279
Mahgava	378.9	2,737
Khomau	100.6	1,316
Narosa	387.1	2,848
Darauna	34.5	375
Indara	484.4	2,136
Khajuri	88.6	517
Karimnagar	173.2	706
Tikari	292.6	1,044
Subhan Nagar Arigawan	83.7	926
Palia	116.3	1,045
Mohammadpur Garhi	185.2	1,309
Gulalpur	313	1,783
Saranva	293.6	1,089
Parsahia	273.8	1,582
Aldampur	213.7	1,500
Kumhrava	481.1	3,087
Bajpur Gangaura	197.8	713
Dariapur	128.3	862
Hemi	165.2	599
Unai	128.3	1,018
Jalalpur	277.3	2,270
Khesravan	127.4	992
Prithvipur	42.4	0
Chak Prithvipur	41.3	1,222
Arjunpur	71.7	1,089
Kamalpur Sirsa	181.5	817
Bibipur	363.6	1,996
Chak Bibipur	9.3	87
Chak Bankat	38.6	532
Daulatpur	174.1	629
Devari Rokhara	308.5	3,205
Tikari	95	1,233
Sultanpur	132.1	2,874
Shahpur Raja	140.3	758
Bhikhampur	59.8	506
Singhamau	173.7	1,548
Bargadikala	132.1	1,777
Mandauli Khurd	127.2	1,456
Beharkaraundi	31.4	331
Shivpuri	819.8	3,747
Kathwara	1,295.3	6,740
Shivkhar	74.3	410
Hardhaurpur	283.6	2,161
Bikamau Khurd	118.9	893
Madaripur	264.7	2,068
Parvatpur	105.8	818
Majheria	119.6	797
Rampur Bahera	204.8	1,867
Digoi	172.5	1,000
Misripur	195.8	1,619
Sonava	232.6	1,596
Digurpur	101	819
Nagavamau Khurd	88.5	564
Naguvamau Kalan	269.6	2,257
Durjanpur	63.8	758
Rajpur	77.7	467
Ancharamau	358.3	3,559
Mohammadpur Saraia	166.9	905
Paharpur	259.5	2,545
Taranpur	77.2	783
Bharsar	165.6	1,253
Ataraura	225.8	2,052
Parsau	199.9	1,329
Bhesi	79.2	452
Singhpur	49.1	496
Malhipur	92.5	474
Rajapur Salempur	175.3	757
Sarsava	144	1,252
Mavaikala	155.2	972
Khantari	243.6	929
Dahanauri	171.4	806
Asti	315	2,043
Barakhempur	217.6	1,600
Fatehpur Khamra	184.6	1,633
Goravamau	59.2	816
Manpur Lala	236.4	1,924
Siwan	210.3	1,863
Hajichak	29.1	295
Kauriamau	107.3	1,166
Sadamau	56	860
Palaka	126	1,735
Bharawamau	191.4	2,900
Chanda Coder	70.3	1,566
Dinkarpur Jhalava	103.2	919
Gohana Kalan	548.8	2,814
Adhar Khera	200.4	1,038
Ajanhar Kalan	202.4	713
Rasoolpur Kayastha	167.9	1,401
Misripur	212.2	4,583
Barkhudarpur	240.2	1,178
Guramba	105.2	2,602
Behta	160.6	3,693
Para	151.2	1,437
Rajauli	291.2	3,892
Paikaramau	385	4,276
Dashauli	250.9	2,921
Kapasi	175.3	1,710
Rasoolpur Sadat	631	4,138
Basaha	546.6	2,344
Mohammadpur Majara	155.6	1,607
Goila	760.6	7,945
Pipri	51.3	318
