= Gorakhpur–Badshahnagar Intercity Express =

Train in India

Gorakhpur Jn - Badshahnagar Intercity Express
Overview
- Service type: Express
- First service: 8 November 2016; 8 years ago
- Current operator(s): Northern Eastern Railway

Route
- Termini: Gorakhpur Junction; Badshahnagar
- Stops: 12
- Distance travelled: 335 km (208 mi)
- Average journey time: 6 hours 27 mins
- Service frequency: Daily
- Train number(s): 15069 / 15070

On-board services
- Class(es): CC, 2S, UR/GEN
- Seating arrangements: Yes
- Sleeping arrangements: Yes
- Catering facilities: No
- Baggage facilities: Yes

Technical
- Rolling stock: ICF coach
- Track gauge: 1,676 mm (5 ft 6 in)
- Operating speed: 110 km/h (68 mph)

The 15069 / 15070 Gorakhpur Junction - Badshahnagar Intercity Express is an Express train belonging to Indian Railways North Eastern Railway zone that runs between Gorakhpur Junction and Badshahnagar via Barhni in India.

It operates as train number 15069 from Gorakhpur Junction to Badshahnagar and as train number 15070 in the reverse direction serving the states of Uttar Pradesh.

== Coaches ==
The 15069 / 70 Gorakhpur Junction - Badshahnagar Intercity Express has 1 AC Chair Car, 1 AC third, 6 Non AC chair car, 4 general unreserved & 2 SLR (seating with luggage rake) coaches. It does not carry a pantry car coach.

As is customary with most train services in India, coach composition may be amended at the discretion of Indian Railways depending on demand.

== Service ==
The 15069 Gorakhpur Junction - Badshahnagar Intercity Express covers the distance of 335 km (208 mi) in 6 hours 05 mins (55 km/h) and in 6 hours 50 mins as the 15070 Badshahnagar - Gorakhpur Junction Intercity Express (49 km/h).

As the average speed of the train is equal than 55 km/h (34 mph), as per railway rules, its fare doesn't includes a Superfast surcharge.

== Routing ==
The 15069 / 15070 Gorakhpur Junction - Badshahnagar Intercity Express runs from Gorakhpur Junction via Barhni, Barabanki Junction to Badshahnagar.

== Traction ==
As the route from Gonda to Gorakhpur via Barhni is not electrified, a Gonda Junction based WDP4D diesel locomotive pulls the train to its destination.
