= Sarvodaya Nagar =

- Settlement
- Panoramic view of settlements in Sarvodaya Nagar form northern edge

- Location in Uttar Pradesh, India
- Coordinates: 26°52′58″N 80°58′16″E
- Country: India
- State: Uttar Pradesh
- District: Lucknow

Area
  - Total: 0.427892 km^{2} (0.165210 sq mi)
- Elevation: 122.6 m (402 ft)

Languages
  - Official: Hindi, Urdu
- Time zone: UTC+5:30 (IST)
- PIN: 226 016
- Telephone code: 522
- Vehicle registration: UP-32

Sarvodaya Nagar is an area in North Indian city of Lucknow consisting of both residential and commercial settlements. It is a part of Mahona Nagar Panchayat in Lucknow district.

== Geography ==
Sarvodaya Nagar is located near the 26.8829°N 80.9712°E. Bank of Gomti River that flows through north and western boundaries of Sarvodaya Nagar. It has an average elevation of 122.6 metres (402 feet). It was known as "ghosi purva"and today is also known for its drain called " kukrail naala". It is home to both Hindus and Muslims and thus has several mosques like badi masjid; chhoti masjid;madina masjid; as well as temple of Sai baba. It has several primary English and Hindi medium schools that help the poor people. It has a cemetery as well.

== Religious integrity ==
Majority of the population of Sarvodaya Nagar follow Hindu and then secondly Islamic Faith and participate and promote religious integrity. This is reflected by the presence of two mosques (Chhoti Masjid and Bari Masjid) and 5 temples along with a big graveyard for Muslims and one cremation site for Hindus in Sarvodaya Nagar.

== Transport ==
Nearest railway station from Sarvodaya Nagar is Badshah Nagar, which is situated on Lucknow - Barabanki railway line maintained by North-East Railway. The transportation is mainly road based. It is connected with the city through City Bus, auto rickshaw and rickshaw etc. Most of the residents have their own conveyances.

== Education ==
Sarvodaya Nagar has Government School and a few convent schools like Rani Laxmi Bai, Meridian School, Motherland school, etc. Sarvodaya Nagar is well connected and one can access almost all the prominent places like Indira Nagar, Aliganj, Gomti Nagar, Hazratganj, Mahanagar easily.
