= Oudh and Tirhut Railway =

Indian railway company

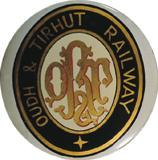
- Industry: Railways
- Predecessor: Bengal and North Western Railway; Rohilkund and Kumaon Railway; Tirhut Railway; Mashrak-Thawe Extension Railway; Lucknow-Bareilly Railway
- Founded: 1 January 1943
- Defunct: 14 April 1952
- Successor: North Eastern Railway
- Headquarters: Gorakhpur, India
- Area served: Northern India
- Services: Rail transport

The Oudh and Tirhut Railway was a Railway company operated in India.

== History ==
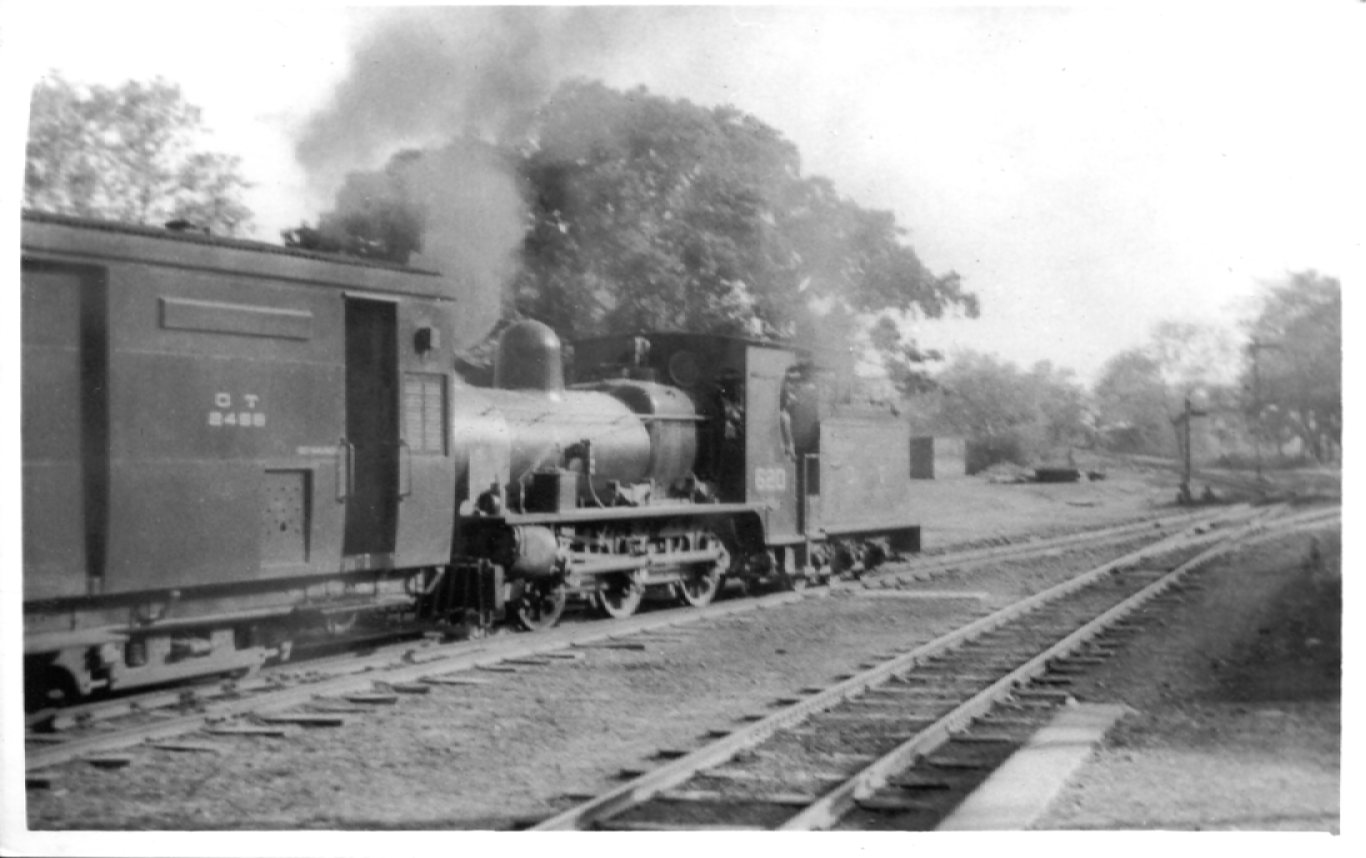
Oudh-Tirhut Railway F1 class 0-6-0 locomotive No. 620 shunting stock at Kathgodam station probably in April 1947. It was withdrawn by 1957.

On 1 January 1943, the Bengal and North Western Railway and the Rohilkund and Kumaon Railway (R&K worked) were acquired by the Government of India and they were amalgamated with the Tirhut Railway, the Mashrak-Thawe Extension Railway (BNW worked) and the Lucknow-Bareilly Railway (R&K worked) to form the Oudh and Tirhut Railway. Its headquarters was at Gorakhpur. Train no. 301UP – 302DOWN Kanpur Anwarganj-Siliguri Avadh (then Oudh)-Tirhut Mail (popularly known as A.T. Mail) was most legendary train of this zone.

The Oudh and Tirhut Railway was later renamed the Oudh Tirhut Railway. On 14 April 1952, the Oudh Tirhut Railway was amalgamated with the Assam Railway and the Kanpur-Achnera section of the Bombay, Baroda and Central India Railway to form North Eastern Railway, one of the 16 zones of the current Indian Railways.

== Classification ==
It was labeled as a Class I railway according to Indian Railway Classification System of 1926.
