= Gulalpur =

Village in Uttar Pradesh, India

Gulalpur Gulālpur
- Village
- Location in Uttar Pradesh, India Gulalpur (India)
- Coordinates: 27.13983°N 80.89136°E
- Country: India
- State: Uttar Pradesh
- District: Lucknow

Area
  - Total: 0.313 km^{2} (0.121 sq mi)
- Elevation: 134 m (440 ft)

Population (2011)
  - Total: 1,783
  - Density: 5,700/km^{2} (14,800/sq mi)

Languages
  - Official: Hindi
- Time zone: UTC+5:30 (IST)

Gulalpur is a village in Bakshi Ka Talab block of Lucknow district, Uttar Pradesh, India. As of 2011, its population is 1,783, in 319 households.
