= Shivpuri, Lucknow =

Village in Uttar Pradesh, India

Shivpuri Shiupuri
- Village
- Location in Uttar Pradesh, India Shivpuri (India)
- Coordinates: 27.04288°N 80.8713°E
- Country: India
- State: Uttar Pradesh
- District: Lucknow

Area
  - Total: 8.918 km^{2} (3.443 sq mi)
- Elevation: 120 m (390 ft)

Population (2011)
  - Total: 3,747
  - Density: 420.2/km^{2} (1,088/sq mi)

Languages
  - Official: Hindi
- Time zone: UTC+5:30 (IST)

Shivpuri, also spelled Shiupuri, is a village in Bakshi Ka Talab block of Lucknow district, Uttar Pradesh, India. As of 2011, its population is 3,747, in 648 households. It is the seat of a gram panchayat, which also includes the village of Bhikhampur.
