= Digoi =

Village in Uttar Pradesh, India

- Village
- Location in Uttar Pradesh, India Digoi (India)
- Coordinates: 27.02067°N 80.9196°E
- Country: India
- State: Uttar Pradesh
- District: Lucknow

Area
  - Total: 1.725 km^{2} (0.666 sq mi)
- Elevation: 127 m (417 ft)

Population (2011)
  - Total: 1,000
  - Density: 580/km^{2} (1,500/sq mi)

Languages
  - Official: Hindi
- Time zone: UTC+5:30 (IST)

Digoi is a village in Bakshi Ka Talab block of Lucknow district, Uttar Pradesh, India. As of 2011, its population is 1,000, in 172 households. It is the seat of a gram panchayat.
