= Chandrika Devi Temple, Lucknow =

Hindu temple in Lucknow, India

Maa Chandrika Devi Temple
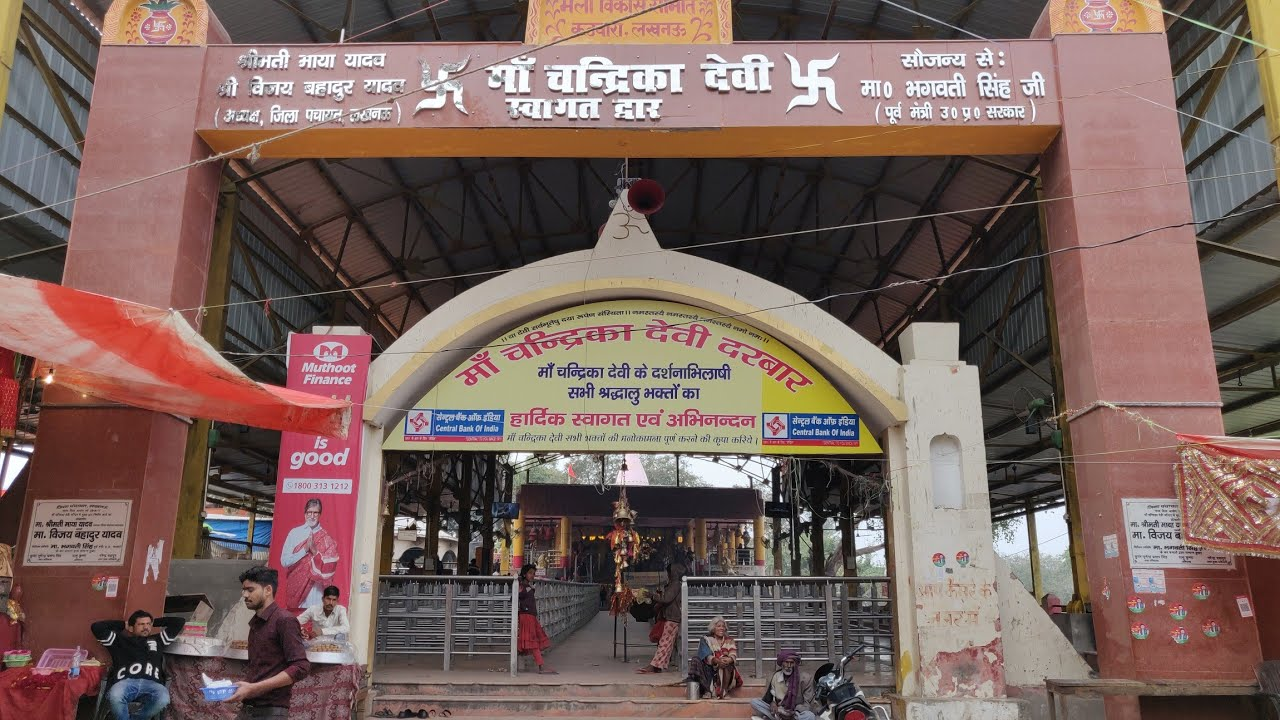

Religion
- Affiliation: Hinduism
- District: Lucknow
- Deity: Durga
- Festivals: Amavasya, Navratri

Location
- Location: Lucknow
- State: Uttar Pradesh
- Country: India
- Interactive map of Maa Chandrika Devi Temple
- Coordinates: 27°1′13.1″N 80°49′46.3″E

Architecture
- Type: Hindu architecture
- Creator: Narad Muni
- Established: Older than 12th Century

Specifications
- Monument: 9 Durga
- Elevation: 123 m (404 ft)

Chandrika Devi Temple is a Hindu temple, dedicated to one of the manifestations of the Hindu goddess Durga, on the bank of river Gomti at Bakshi Ka Talab in Lucknow, Uttar Pradesh.

There are nine idols of Durga, who is said to have appeared in the hollow of an old neem tree.
