= Sarai Damu =

Village in Uttar Pradesh, India

Pipri Sarāi Dāmu
- Village
- Location in Uttar Pradesh, India Pipri (India)
- Coordinates: 27.12847°N 80.90196°E
- Country: India
- State: Uttar Pradesh
- District: Lucknow

Area
  - Total: 1.368 km^{2} (0.528 sq mi)
- Elevation: 135 m (443 ft)

Population (2011)
  - Total: 1,081
  - Density: 790.2/km^{2} (2,047/sq mi)

Languages
  - Official: Hindi
- Time zone: UTC+5:30 (IST)

Sarai Damu is a village in Bakshi Ka Talab block of Lucknow district, Uttar Pradesh, India. As of 2011, its population is 1,081, in 219 households.
