= Raipur Raja =

Village in Uttar Pradesh, India

Raipur
- Village
- Location in Uttar Pradesh, India Raipur (India)
- Coordinates: 27.07426°N 80.87976°E
- Country: India
- State: Uttar Pradesh
- District: Lucknow

Area
  - Total: 2.367 km^{2} (0.914 sq mi)
- Elevation: 130 m (430 ft)

Population (2011)
  - Total: 1,920
  - Density: 811/km^{2} (2,100/sq mi)

Languages
  - Official: Hindi
- Time zone: UTC+5:30 (IST)

Raipur Raja is a village in Bakshi Ka Talab block of Lucknow district, Uttar Pradesh, India. As of 2011, its population is 1,920, in 350 households. It is the seat of a gram panchayat.
