= Arjunpur (Bilhaur) =

- Village
- Location in Kanpur, Uttar Pradesh, India Arjunpur (India)
- Coordinates: 26.73°N 80.10°E
- Country: India
- State: Uttar Pradesh
- District: Kanpur Nagar

Population (2011 Census of India)
  - Total: 590

Languages
  - Official: Hindi
- Time zone: UTC+5:30 (IST)
- PIN: 209210
- Vehicle registration: UP-78

Arjunpur is a village in Debipur Sarai Gram panchayat in Bilhaur Tehsil, Kanpur Nagar district, Uttar Pradesh, India. Agriculture is the main profession of the villagers.

As per 2011 Census of India report the population of the village is 590 where 318 are men and 272 are women.
