= Indara, Lucknow =

Village in Uttar Pradesh, India

Indara
- Village
- Location in Uttar Pradesh, India Indara (India)
- Coordinates: 27.09781°N 80.99114°E
- Country: India
- State: Uttar Pradesh
- District: Lucknow

Area
  - Total: 4.844 km^{2} (1.870 sq mi)
- Elevation: 130 m (430 ft)

Population (2011)
  - Total: 2,136
  - Density: 441.0/km^{2} (1,142/sq mi)

Languages
  - Official: Hindi
- Time zone: UTC+5:30 (IST)

Indara is a village in Bakshi Ka Talab block of Lucknow district, Uttar Pradesh, India. As of 2011, its population is 2,136, in 385 households. It is the seat of a gram panchayat, which also includes the village of Khajuri.
