= Bhagautipur, Lucknow =

Village in Uttar Pradesh, India

Bhagautipur
- Village
- Location in Uttar Pradesh, India Bhagautipur (India)
- Coordinates: 27.12856°N 80.91561°E
- Country: India
- State: Uttar Pradesh
- District: Lucknow

Area
  - Total: 1.161 km^{2} (0.448 sq mi)
- Elevation: 132 m (433 ft)

Population (2011)
  - Total: 833
  - Density: 717/km^{2} (1,860/sq mi)

Languages
  - Official: Hindi
- Time zone: UTC+5:30 (IST)

Bhagautipur is a village in Bakshi Ka Talab block of Lucknow district, Uttar Pradesh, India. As of 2011, its population is 833, in 141 households. It is the seat of a gram panchayat, which also includes the village of Bhatesua.
