= DPS Barra =

Delhi Public School, Barra
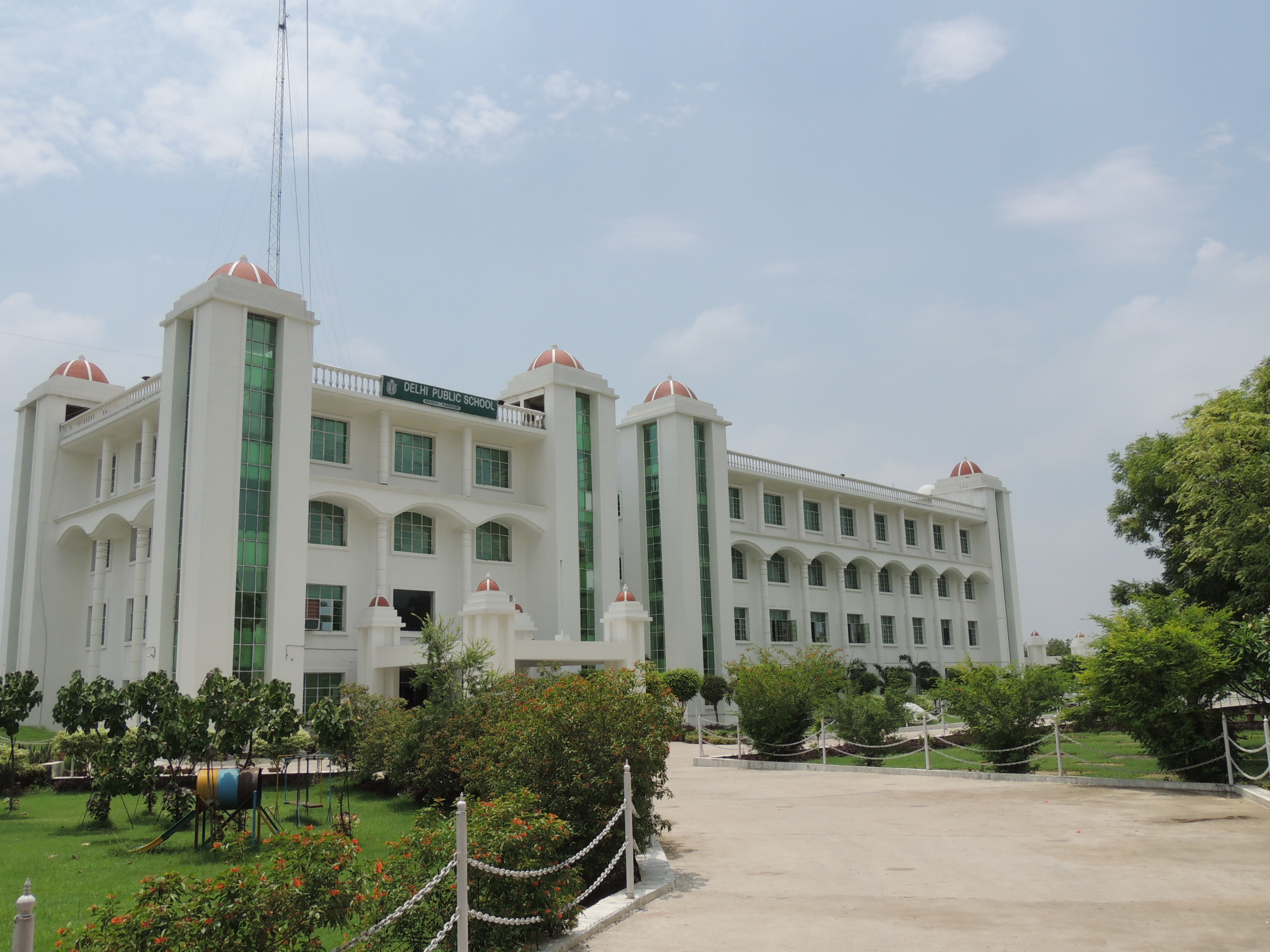
- Delhi Public School Barra
- Barra, Kanpur, Uttar Pradesh; India

Information
- Type: Private School
- Motto: Service Before Self
- Established: 2010
- Founder: Mr. Alok Misra
- Principal: Mrs. Jayanti Mitra
- Staff: 75+
- Enrollment: 1000+
- Campus: Urban
- Colours: Green and white
- Affiliations: Central Board of Secondary Education, Delhi Public School Society
- Acronym: DPS
- Website: www.dpsbarra.com

Delhi Public School Barra is a private school running under the aegis of the Delhi Public School Society, New Delhi in Kanpur in the Indian state of Uttar Pradesh. This school is affiliated to the Central Board of Secondary Education (CBSE), New Delhi. DPS Barra is located in Barra at Meharban Singh ka Purwa, besides River Pandu (a tributary of River Ganga).

== Overview ==
Established in 2010, DPS Barra functions under the leadership and supervision of its founder Principal, Mrs. Shilpa Manish. Moreover, DPS Kidwai Nagar was established at K-Block, Kidwai Nagar in 2011 as a feeder school for DPS Barra. DPS Barra, located in a 14-acre campus is a co-educational school. The School has of an Administrative Block and an Academic Block. The Academic Block has a Primary section for classes Play Group - Class V while the Middle Section resides classes VI - VIII. The Senior Section consists of classes IX – X. The School has an amphitheater, a multipurpose hall, playground, academic Labs and a library. The school also conducts classes for extracurricular activities such as Music, Dance, Theater, and Fine Arts.

== Activities ==
DPS Barra trains Students in various sports such as cricket, football, basketball, archery, horse riding and adventure sports. The school also conducts numerous inter school events throughout the year. DPS Barra hosted the Inter DPS Football Tournament for Boys at the Zonal level. The competition was held from 24 – 26 October 2013. 12 Delhi Public Schools’ participated in the Zonal tournament. DPS Azaad Nagar was declared the Winners of the tournament while DPS Bhopal emerged as the 1st Runners Up.

The annual concert of the school "Umang" is held on 13 December 2015. It is a platform for the students to present social awareness and understanding of diverse cultures & religion through music and dance. As part of the Kanpur Sahodaya Inter School Competitions, DPS Barra hosted the Rock Band Competition in its premises. The competition, which was held on 10 December 2013, saw 10 CBSE schools participate in the Rock Band event...

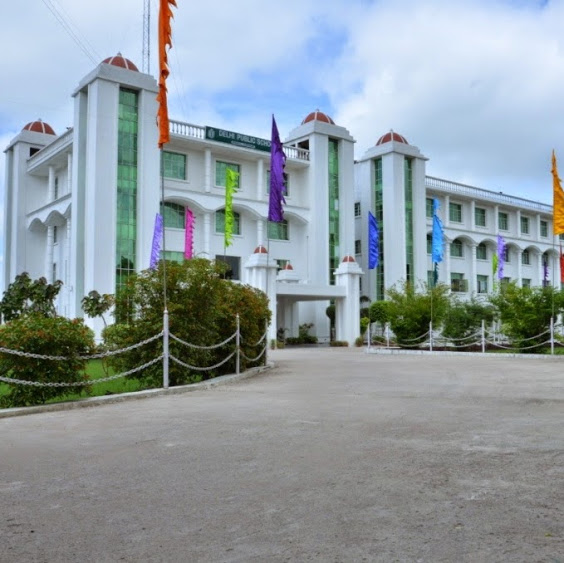
Delhi Public School Barra

== See also ==
- Delhi Public School Society
- List of schools in Kanpur
- DPS Azaad Nagar
- Delhi Public School, Servodaya nagar
- Delhi Public School Kidwai Nagar
