= Palpur =

Village in Uttar Pradesh, India

Palpur Pālpur
- Village
- Location in Uttar Pradesh, India Palpur (India)
- Coordinates: 27.06771°N 80.89059°E
- Country: India
- State: Uttar Pradesh
- District: Lucknow

Area
  - Total: 0.62 km^{2} (0.24 sq mi)
- Elevation: 129 m (423 ft)

Population (2011)
  - Total: 921
  - Density: 1,500/km^{2} (3,800/sq mi)

Languages
  - Official: Hindi
- Time zone: UTC+5:30 (IST)

Palpur is a village in Bakshi Ka Talab block of Lucknow district, Uttar Pradesh, India. As of 2011, its population is 921, in 146 households.
