= Lucknow–Sitapur–Seramow Provincial State Railway =

Railway line in India

Lucknow–Sitapur–Sehramau-Pilibhit Provincial State Railway
- Industry: Railways
- Predecessor: none
- Founded: 1886
- Defunct: 1 January 1891
- Successor: Lucknow–Bareilly Railway
- Headquarters: India
- Area served: Northern India
- Services: Rail transport

The Lucknow–Sitapur–Sehramau-Pilibhit Provincial State Railway was owned by the Provincial Government and worked as part of the Indian Railways.

== History ==
The following three metre gauge sections opened as part of the Lucknow–Sitapur–Seramow Provincial State Railway, namely: Lucknow to Sitapur (55 miles) opened on 16 November 1886, Sitapur to Lakhimpur (28 miles) opened on 15 April 1887, and Lakhimpur to Gola Gokaran Nath (22 miles) opened on 4 December 1887. The Lucknow–Sitapur–Seramow Provincial State Railway merged with the Bareilly–Pilibheet Provincial State Railway to form the Lucknow–Bareilly Railway on 1 January 1891.

== Conversion to broad gauge ==
The railway lines were converted to 1,676 mm (5 ft 6 in) broad gauge in 2017.
