= Mashrak–Thawe Extension Railway =

Railway in India

- Industry: Railways
- Predecessor: none
- Founded: 12 January 1931
- Defunct: 1 January 1943.
- Successor: Oudh and Tirhut Railway
- Headquarters: India
- Area served: Northern India
- Services: Rail transport

Mashrak–Thawe Extension Railway was owned by the Government of India and worked by Bengal and North Western Railway.

== History ==
The 39-mile-long (63 km) metre gauge line from Mashrak to Thawe was opened on 12 January 1931. The Mashrak–Thawe Extension Railway was merged into the Oudh and Tirhut Railway on 1 January 1943.

== Conversion to broad gauge ==
The railway line was converted to 1,676 mm (5 ft 6 in) broad gauge in 2017.
