= Farakka (community development block) =

- Community development block
- Interactive map of Farakka
- Coordinates: 24.7976°N 87.9143°E
- Country: India
- State: West Bengal
- District: Murshidabad

Government
  - Type: Federal democracy

Area
  - Total: 132.74 km^{2} (51.25 sq mi)
- Elevation: 32 m (105 ft)

Population (2011)
  - Total: 274,111
  - Density: 2,065.0/km^{2} (5,348.4/sq mi)

Languages
  - Official: Bengali, English

Literacy
  - Literacy (2011): 60.47%
- Time zone: UTC+5:30 (IST)
- PIN: 742212 (Farakka Project); 742202 (Dhuliyan)
- Telephone/STD code: 03485
- Vehicle registration: WB-57, WB-58
- Lok Sabha constituency: Maldaha Dakshin
- Vidhan Sabha constituency: Samserganj, Farakka
- Website: murshidabad.gov.in

Farakka is a community development block that forms an administrative division in the Jangipur subdivision of Murshidabad district in the Indian state of West Bengal.

== Geography ==
Farakka is located at 24°47′51″N 87°54′51″E

Farakka CD block lies at the north-western corner of Rarh region in Murshidabad district. The Bhagirathi River splits the district into two natural physiographic regions – Rarh on the west and Bagri on the east. The Rarh region spreads over from the adjoining Santhal Pargana division of Jharkhand. The land is slightly higher in altitude than the surrounding plains and is undulating. It is interspersed with swamps and beds of old river. The Rajmahal Hills rise in Jharkhand, a few miles from the western boundary of the block, and there are some hillocks within the block also. The Padma River separates Murshidabad district from Malda district and Chapai Nawabganj and Rajshahi districts of Bangladesh in the north. The soil in the region is mostly clay and lateritic clay.

Farakka CD block is bounded by Kaliachak III CD block, across the Ganges in Malda district, in the north, Barhawarwa CD block in Sahibganj district of Jharkhand, in the west, Pakur CD block in Pakur district of Jharkhand in the south and Samserganj CD block in the east.

The Bhagirathi is bifurcated from the Ganges at Khejurtala, about 40 kilometres downstream from Farakka.

The Rarh region or the western part of the district is drained by the right bank tributaries of the Bhagirathi, flowing down from the hilly / plateau region of Santhal Pargana division in neighbouring Jharkhand. The Farakka Barrage regulates the flow of water into the Bhagirathi through the feeder canal. Thereafter, it is fed with the discharge from the Mayurakshi system. About 1,800 km^{2} of area in the neighbourhood of Kandi town is flooded by the combined discharge of the Mayurakshi, Dwarka, Brahmani, Gambhira, Kopai and Bakreshwar – the main contributor being the Mayurakshi. Certain other areas in the western sector also get flooded.

A major problem in Murshidabad district is river bank erosion. As of 2013, an estimated 2.4 million people reside along the banks of the Ganges alone in Murshidabad district. Between 1931 and 1977, 26,769 hectares have been eroded and many villages have been fully submerged. 1980–1990 was a decade of erosion for this district and during the decade Giria, Sekhalipur, Khejustala, Mithipur, Fajilpur, Rajapur, Akheriganj, Parashpur villages were badly affected. Many families living along the Ganges continue to be affected. As for example, in 2007, severe erosion occurred in Lalgola, Bhagawangola II, Farakka and Raninnagar II CD Blocks.

See also – River bank erosion along the Ganges in Malda and Murshidabad districts

Farakka CD block has an area of 132.74 km^{2}. It has 1 panchayat samity, 9 gram panchayats, 147 gram sansads (village councils), 73 mouzas and 56 inhabited villages. Farakka police station serves this block. Headquarters of this CD block is at Farakka.

Gram panchayats in Farakka block/ panchayat samiti are: Arjunpur, Bahadurpur, Beniagram, Bewa I, Bewa II, Imamnagar, Mahadevnagar, Maheshpur and Nayansukhi.

== Demographics ==
=== Population ===
According to the 2011 Census of India, Farakka CD block had a total population of 274,111, of which 167,826 were rural and 106,285 were urban. There were 139,226 (51%) males and 134,885 (49%) females. Population in the age range 0-6 years was 225,344. Scheduled Castes numbered 32,689 (11.93%) and Scheduled Tribes numbered 5,165 (1.88%).

As of 2001 census, Farakka block has a total population of 219,775, out of which 112,447 were males and 107,328 were females. Farakka block registered a population growth of 24.13 per cent during the 1991–2001 decade. Decadal growth for the district was 23.70 per cent. Decadal growth in West Bengal was 17.84 per cent.

Decadal Population Growth Rate (%)

- Farakka CD block
- Murshidabad district
- West Bengal

The decadal growth of population in Farakka CD block in 2001–2011 was 24.57%.

The decadal growth rate of population in Murshidabad district was as follows: 33.5% in 1951–61, 28.6% in 1961–71, 25.5% in 1971–81, 28.2% in 1981–91, 23.8% in 1991–2001 and 21.1% in 2001-11. The decadal growth rate for West Bengal in 2001-11 was 13.93%.

The decadal growth rate of population in Chapai Nawabganj District, located nearby across the Ganges, in Bangladesh was 15.59% for the decade 2001–2011, down from 21.67% in the decade 1991–2001.

There are reports of Bangladeshi infiltrators entering Murshidabad district.

=== Census towns and villages ===
Census towns in Farakka CD block were (2011 figures in brackets): Farakka Barrage Township (20,126), Srimantapur (P) (4,374), Benia Gram (15,046), Arjunpur (6,042), Sibnagar (6,812), Mamrejpur (9,851), Pranpara (22,297) and Mahadeb Nagar (21,737).

Large villages in Farakka CD block were (2011 figures in brackets): Bahadurpur (4,079), Uttar Bhabanipur (5,509), Bewa (P) (15,265), Andhua (4,090), Sri Rampur (4,848), Jafarganj (12,114), Ballalpur (7,117), Imamnagar (6,933), Kuli (28,092), Bhabanipur (11,465), Sankarpur (4,411) and Jigrikulgachhi (6,004).

=== Literacy ===
As per the 2011 census, the total number of literates in Farakka CD block was 134,650 (60.47% of the population over 6 years) out of which males numbered 74,957 (65.56% of the male population over 6 years) and females numbered 59,693 (53.77% of the female population over 6 years). The gender disparity (the difference between female and male literacy rates) was 11.79%.

See also – List of West Bengal districts ranked by literacy rate

Literacy in CD blocks of
Murshidabad district
Jangipur subdivision
Farakka – 59.75%
Samserganj – 54.98%
Suti I – 58.40%
Suti II – 55.23%
Raghunathganj I – 64.49%
Raghunathganj II – 61.17%
Sagardighi – 65.27%
Lalbag subdivision
Murshidabad-Jiaganj – 69.14%
Bhagawangola I - 57.22%
Bhagawangola II – 53.48%
Lalgola– 64.32%
Nabagram – 70.83%
Sadar subdivision
Berhampore – 73.51%
Beldanga I – 70.06%
Beldanga II – 67.86%
Hariharpara – 69.20%
Naoda – 66.09%
Kandi subdivision
Kandi – 65.13%
Khargram – 63.56%
Burwan – 68.96%
Bharatpur I – 62.93%
Bharatpur II – 66.07%
Domkol subdivision
Domkal – 55.89%
Raninagar I – 57.81%
Raninagar II – 54.81%
Jalangi – 58.73%
Source: 2011 Census: CD Block Wise
Primary Census Abstract Data

=== Language and religion ===
Religion in Farakka CD block (2011)
Islam	67.15%
Hinduism	32.23%
Christianity	0.44%
Other or not stated	0.18%

In the 2011 census, Muslims numbered 184,074 and formed 67.15% of the population in Farakka CD block. Hindus numbered 88,353 and formed 32.23% of the population. Others numbered 1,684 and formed 0.62% of the population. While the proportion of Muslims increased from 59.34% in 1991 to 62.76% in 2001, the proportion of Hindus declined from 40.36% in 1991 to 36.65% in 2001.

Murshidabad district had 4,707,573 Muslims who formed 66.27% of the population, 2,359,061 Hindus who formed 33.21% of the population, and 37, 173 persons belonging to other religions who formed 0.52% of the population, in the 2011 census. While the proportion of Muslim population in the district increased from 61.40% in 1991 to 63.67% in 2001, the proportion of Hindu population declined from 38.39% in 1991 to 35.92% in 2001.

Murshidabad was the only Muslim majority district in West Bengal at the time of partition of India in 1947. The proportion of Muslims in the population of Murshidabad district in 1951 was 55.24%. The Radcliffe Line had placed Muslim majority Murshidabad in India and the Hindu majority Khulna in Pakistan, in order to maintain the integrity of the Ganges river system in India.

Languages of Farakka CD block (2011)
1. Bengali (96.8%)
2. Khotta (1.08%)
3. Others (2.14%)

At the time of the 2011 census, 96.78% of the population spoke Bengali and 1.08% Khotta as their first language.

== Rural poverty ==
As per the Human Development Report 2004 for West Bengal, the rural poverty ratio in Murshidabad district was 46.12%. Purulia, Bankura and Birbhum districts had higher rural poverty ratios. These estimates were based on Central Sample data of NSS 55th round 1999–2000.

== Economy ==
=== Livelihood ===
Livelihood
in Farakka CD block
1. Cultivators (4.20%)
2. Agricultural labourers (12.3%)
3. Household industries (40.1%)
4. Other Workers (43.4%)

In Farakka CD block in 2011, amongst the class of total workers, cultivators numbered 5,082 and formed 4.20%, agricultural labourers numbered 14,864 and formed 12.29%, household industry workers numbered 48,561 and formed 40.15% and other workers numbered 52,439 and formed 43.36%.

=== Infrastructure ===
There are 56 inhabited villages in Farakka CD block. 100% villages have power supply and drinking water supply. 13 villages (23.21%) have post offices. 50 villages (89.29%) have telephones (including landlines, public call offices and mobile phones). 21 villages (37.50%) have a pucca approach road and 14 villages (25.00%) have transport communication (includes bus service, rail facility and navigable waterways). 3 villages (5.36%) have agricultural credit societies and 5 villages (8.93%) have banks.

=== Farakka Barrage ===
Construction of the Farakka Barrage commenced in 1961 and it was commissioned in 1975. There is a 38.38 km long feeder canal that takes off upstream of the Farakka Barrage and links with the Bhagirathi River. The feeder canal was constructed across the flow of the small flashy rivers such as Gumani, Trimohini and Kanloi. The discharges of the Trimohini and Kanloi were designed to flow into the feeder canal, and whenever the discharges of these rivers exceed the design capacity, they cause problems. The discharge of the Bagmari was designed to flow into the Ganga along its course through a siphone across the feeder canal. With the choking of the outlet to the Ganges, the flood discharge spills over to the basins of the Pagla and the Bansloi and floods around 100 km^{2}

As per the treaty between India and Bangladesh, signed in 1996, for sharing of the Ganges water at Farakka, the division is as follows:

Availability at Farakka	Share of India	Share of Bangladesh
70,000 cusecs or less	50%	50%
70,000 – 75,000 cusecs	Balance of the flow	35,000 cusecs
75,000 cusecs or more	40,000 cusecs	Balance of the flow

=== Power station ===
The 2,100 MW Farakka Super Thermal Power Station of NTPC at Nabarun was commissioned between 1986 and 2011.

=== Farakka Port ===
Farakka Port is a minor river port that handles coal imported for Farakka Super Thermal Power Station.

=== Agriculture ===
From 1977 onwards major land reforms took place in West Bengal. Land in excess of land ceiling was acquired and distributed amongst the peasants. Following land reforms land ownership pattern has undergone transformation. In 2013–14, persons engaged in agriculture in Farakka CD block could be classified as follows: bargadars 1,055 (3.51%,) patta (document) holders 5,377 (17.89%), small farmers (possessing land between 1 and 2 hectares) 1,003 (3.34%), marginal farmers (possessing land up to 1 hectare) 7,764 (25.83%) and agricultural labourers 14,864 (49.44%).

Farakka CD block had 25 fertiliser depots, 1 seed store and 42 fair price shops in 2013–14.

In 2013–14, Farakka CD block produced 1,729 tonnes of Aman paddy, the main winter crop from 851 hectares, 195 tonnes of Boro paddy (spring crop) from 68 hectares, 189 tonnes of Aus paddy (summer crop) from 138 hectares, 1,982 tonnes of wheat from 763 hectares, 31,799 tonnes of jute from 2,041 hectares, 5,140 tonnes of potatoes from 284 hectares and 25,824 tonnes of sugar cane from 400 hectares. It also produced pulses and oilseeds.

In 2013–14, the total area irrigated in Farakka CD block was 1,330 hectares, out of which 450 hectares were irrigated by canal water, 380 hectares with tank water, and 500 hectares by other means.

=== Beedi industry ===
As of 2003, around 400,000 workers were engaged in the prime area locations of beedi making, a household industry, in Farakka, Samserganj, Suti I, Suti II, Raghunathganj I and Raghunathganj II CD blocks. The majority of those working are women and children. Almost all households are engaged in this activity.

See also – Beedi Workers of Murshidabad (in Hindi). Lok Sabha TV feature

=== Silk and handicrafts ===
Murshidabad is famous for its silk industry since the Middle Ages. There are three distinct categories in this industry, namely (i) Mulberry cultivation and silkworm rearing (ii) Peeling of raw silk (iii) Weaving of silk fabrics.

Ivory carving is an important cottage industry from the era of the Nawabs. The main areas where this industry has flourished are Khagra and Jiaganj. 99% of ivory craft production is exported. In more recent years sandalwood etching has become more popular than ivory carving. Bell metal and Brass utensils are manufactured in large quantities at Khagra, Berhampore, Kandi and Jangipur.

=== Banking ===
In 2013–14, Farakka CD block had offices of 7 commercial banks and 1 gramin bank.

=== Backward Regions Grant Fund ===
Murshidabad district is listed as a backward region and receives financial support from the Backward Regions Grant Fund. The fund, created by the Government of India, is designed to redress regional imbalances in development. As of 2012, 272 districts across the country were listed under this scheme. The list includes 11 districts of West Bengal.

== Transport ==
Farakka CD block has 4 ferry services and 4 originating/ terminating bus routes.

The Barharwa-Azimganj-Katwa loop line passes through this block and there are stations at Tildanga and Ballalpur railway station.

New Farakka Junction railway station is on the Howrah-New Jalpaiguri line.

National Highway 12 (old number NH 34) passes through this block.

== Education ==
In 2013–14, Farakka CD block had 92 primary schools with 20,970 students, 11 middle schools with 3,360 students, 2 high school with 2,094 students and 11 higher secondary schools with 3,0572 students. Farakka CD block had 1 general college with 2,242 students and 391 institutions special and non-formal education with 15,450 students.

Prof. Sayed Nurul Hasan College was established in 1994 at Farakka, It is named after Saiyid Nurul Hasan, historian and former governor of West Bengal. Affiliated to the University of Kalyani it offers honours courses in Bengali, English, Arabic, history, political science, sociology, education, economics and geography.

In Farakka CD block, amongst the 56 inhabited villages, 11 villages did not have a school, 15 villages have more than 1 primary school, 12 villages have at least 1 primary and 1 middle school and 9 villages had at least 1 middle and 1 secondary school.

== Healthcare ==
In 2014, Farakka CD block had 1 block primary health centre, 3 primary health centres and 1 central PSU medical centre with total 37 beds and 4 doctors (excluding private bodies). It had 35 family welfare subcentres. 898 patients were treated indoor and 42,134 patients were treated outdoor in the hospitals, health centres and subcentres of the CD Block.

Farakka CD block has Farakka Barrage Hospital (with 50 beds), Farakka Block Primary Health Centre at Farakka (with 10 beds), Benia Gram Primary Health Centre (working as BPHC) (with 15 beds), Arjunpur PHC (with 10 beds) and Kendua PHC at Srimantapur (with 2 beds).

Farakka CD block is one of the areas of Murshidabad district where ground water is affected by a high level of arsenic contamination. The WHO guideline for arsenic in drinking water is 10 mg/ litre, and the Indian Standard value is 50 mg/ litre. All but one of the 26 blocks of Murshidabad district have arsenic contamination above the WHO level, all but two of the blocks have arsenic concentration above the Indian Standard value and 17 blocks have arsenic concentration above 300 mg/litre. The maximum concentration in Farakka CD Block is 150 mg/litre.
