= Pipri, Lucknow =

Village in Uttar Pradesh, India

Pipri
- Village
- Location in Uttar Pradesh, India Pipri (India)
- Coordinates: 27.11948°N 80.91171°E
- Country: India
- State: Uttar Pradesh
- District: Lucknow

Area
  - Total: 0.513 km^{2} (0.198 sq mi)
- Elevation: 135 m (443 ft)

Population (2011)
  - Total: 318
  - Density: 620/km^{2} (1,610/sq mi)

Languages
  - Official: Hindi
- Time zone: UTC+5:30 (IST)

Pipri is a village in Bakshi Ka Talab block of Lucknow district, Uttar Pradesh, India. As of 2011, its population is 318, in 69 households. It was first officially upgraded to village status for the 2011 Census.
