= Bibipur, Bakshi Ka Talab =

Village in Uttar Pradesh, India

Bibipur
- Village
- Location in Uttar Pradesh, India Bibipur (India)
- Coordinates: 27.06271°N 80.92492°E
- Country: India
- State: Uttar Pradesh
- District: Lucknow

Area
  - Total: 3.636 km^{2} (1.404 sq mi)
- Elevation: 131 m (430 ft)

Population (2011)
  - Total: 1,996
  - Density: 549.0/km^{2} (1,422/sq mi)

Languages
  - Official: Hindi
- Time zone: UTC+5:30 (IST)

Bibipur is a village in Bakshi Ka Talab block of Lucknow district, Uttar Pradesh, India. As of 2011, its population is 1,996, in 335 households. It is the seat of a gram panchayat, which also includes the village of Chak Bibipur.
