= Aramba =

Village in Uttar Pradesh, India

- Village
- Location in Uttar Pradesh, India Aramba (India)
- Coordinates: 27.13882°N 80.90346°E
- Country: India
- State: Uttar Pradesh
- District: Lucknow

Area
  - Total: 2.613 km^{2} (1.009 sq mi)
- Elevation: 133 m (436 ft)

Population (2011)
  - Total: 2,459
  - Density: 941.1/km^{2} (2,437/sq mi)

Languages
  - Official: Hindi
- Time zone: UTC+5:30 (IST)

Aramba is a village in Bakshi Ka Talab block of Lucknow district, Uttar Pradesh, India. As of 2011, its population is 2,459, in 484 households. It is the seat of a gram panchayat.
