= Sarsava =

Village in Uttar Pradesh, India

Sarsava Sarsawa
- Village
- Location in Uttar Pradesh, India Sarsava (India)
- Coordinates: 27.02684°N 80.97368°E
- Country: India
- State: Uttar Pradesh
- District: Lucknow

Area
  - Total: 1.44 km^{2} (0.56 sq mi)
- Elevation: 126 m (413 ft)

Population (2011)
  - Total: 1,252
  - Density: 869/km^{2} (2,250/sq mi)

Languages
  - Official: Hindi
- Time zone: UTC+5:30 (IST)

Sarsava, also spelled Sarsawa, is a village in Bakshi Ka Talab block of Lucknow district, Uttar Pradesh, India. As of 2011, its population is 1,252, in 215 households.
