= Singhamau =

Village in Uttar Pradesh, India

Singhamau Singhāmau
- Village
- Location in Uttar Pradesh, India Singhamau (India)
- Coordinates: 27.0582°N 80.88432°E
- Country: India
- State: Uttar Pradesh
- District: Lucknow

Area
  - Total: 1.737 km^{2} (0.671 sq mi)
- Elevation: 127 m (417 ft)

Population (2011)
  - Total: 1,548
  - Density: 891.2/km^{2} (2,308/sq mi)

Languages
  - Official: Hindi
- Time zone: UTC+5:30 (IST)

Singhamau is a village in Bakshi Ka Talab block of Lucknow district, Uttar Pradesh, India. As of 2011, its population is 1,548, in 277 households.
