= Unai, Lucknow =

Village in Uttar Pradesh, India

Unai
- Village
- Location in Uttar Pradesh, India Unai (India)
- Coordinates: 27.06405°N 80.96836°E
- Country: India
- State: Uttar Pradesh
- District: Lucknow

Area
  - Total: 1.283 km^{2} (0.495 sq mi)
- Elevation: 130 m (430 ft)

Population (2011)
  - Total: 1,018
  - Density: 793.5/km^{2} (2,055/sq mi)

Languages
  - Official: Hindi
- Time zone: UTC+5:30 (IST)

Unai is a village in Bakshi Ka Talab block of Lucknow district, Uttar Pradesh, India. As of 2011, its population is 1,018, in 194 households.
