= Lucknow–Bareilly Railway =

Railway line in India

- Industry: Railways
- Predecessor: Lucknow–Sitapur–Seramow Provincial State Railway and Bareilly–Pilibheet Provincial State Railway
- Founded: 1 January 1891
- Defunct: 1 January 1943
- Successor: Oudh and Tirhut Railway
- Headquarters: India
- Area served: Northern India
- Services: Rail transport

The Lucknow–Bareilly Railway or Lucknow–Bareilly State Railway was owned by the Government of India and worked by the Rohilkund and Kumaon Railway. The Lucknow–Bareilly Railway was formed on 1 January 1891 by the merger of the Lucknow–Sitapur–Seramow Provincial State Railway and the Bareilly–Pilibheet Provincial State Railway. The Lucknow–Bareilly Railway was merged into the Oudh and Tirhut Railway on 1 January 1943.

== Conversion to broad gauge ==
The railway lines were converted to 1,676 mm (5 ft 6 in) broad gauge in 2017.

== Notes ==
1. Rao, M.A. (1988). Indian Railways, New Delhi: National Book Trust
2. Chapter 1 - Evolution of Indian Railways-Historical Background
