= Paharpur, Bakshi Ka Talab =

Village in Uttar Pradesh, India

Paharpur Pahārpur
- Village
- Location in Uttar Pradesh, India Paharpur (India)
- Coordinates: 27.04402°N 80.93939°E
- Country: India
- State: Uttar Pradesh
- District: Lucknow

Area
  - Total: 2.595 km^{2} (1.002 sq mi)
- Elevation: 129 m (423 ft)

Population (2011)
  - Total: 2,545
  - Density: 980.7/km^{2} (2,540/sq mi)

Languages
  - Official: Hindi
- Time zone: UTC+5:30 (IST)

Paharpur is a village in Bakshi Ka Talab block of Lucknow district, Uttar Pradesh, India. As of 2011, its population is 2,545, in 485 households. It is the seat of a gram panchayat, which also includes the village of Mohammadpur Saraia.
