= Debipur Sarai =

- Village
- Location in Kanpur, Uttar Pradesh, India Debipur Sarai (India)
- Coordinates: 26.74°N 80.11°E
- Country: India
- State: Uttar Pradesh
- District: Kanpur Nagar

Population (2011 Census of India)
  - Total: 1,087

Languages
  - Official: Hindi
- Time zone: UTC+5:30 (IST)
- PIN: 209210
- Vehicle registration: UP-78

Debipur Sarai is a village and Gram panchayat in Bilhaur Tehsil, Kanpur Nagar district, Uttar Pradesh, India. The village is located 47 km towards north from Kanpur city.

As per 2011 Census of India report the population of the village is 1087 where 590 are men and 497 are women.
