= Bangaon, Lucknow =

Village in Uttar Pradesh, India

Bangaon Bangāon
- Village
- Location in Uttar Pradesh, India Bangaon (India)
- Coordinates: 27.07349°N 80.88901°E
- Country: India
- State: Uttar Pradesh
- District: Lucknow

Area
  - Total: 0.773 km^{2} (0.298 sq mi)
- Elevation: 132 m (433 ft)

Population (2011)
  - Total: 730
  - Density: 940/km^{2} (2,400/sq mi)

Languages
  - Official: Hindi
- Time zone: UTC+5:30 (IST)

Bangaon is a village in Bakshi Ka Talab block of Lucknow district, Uttar Pradesh, India. As of 2011, its population is 730, in 151 households.
