= Arjunpur, Lucknow =

Village in Uttar Pradesh, India

Arjunpur
- Village
- Location in Uttar Pradesh, India Arjunpur (India)
- Coordinates: 27.05143°N 80.90381°E
- Country: India
- State: Uttar Pradesh
- District: Lucknow

Area
  - Total: 0.717 km^{2} (0.277 sq mi)
- Elevation: 128 m (420 ft)

Population (2011)
  - Total: 1,089
  - Density: 1,520/km^{2} (3,930/sq mi)

Languages
  - Official: Hindi
- Time zone: UTC+5:30 (IST)

Arjunpur is a village in Bakshi Ka Talab block of Lucknow district, Uttar Pradesh, India. As of 2011, its population is 1,089, in 193 households. It is part of the gram panchayat of Chak Prithvipur.
