= Rohilkund and Kumaon Railway =

Metre-gauge railway in India

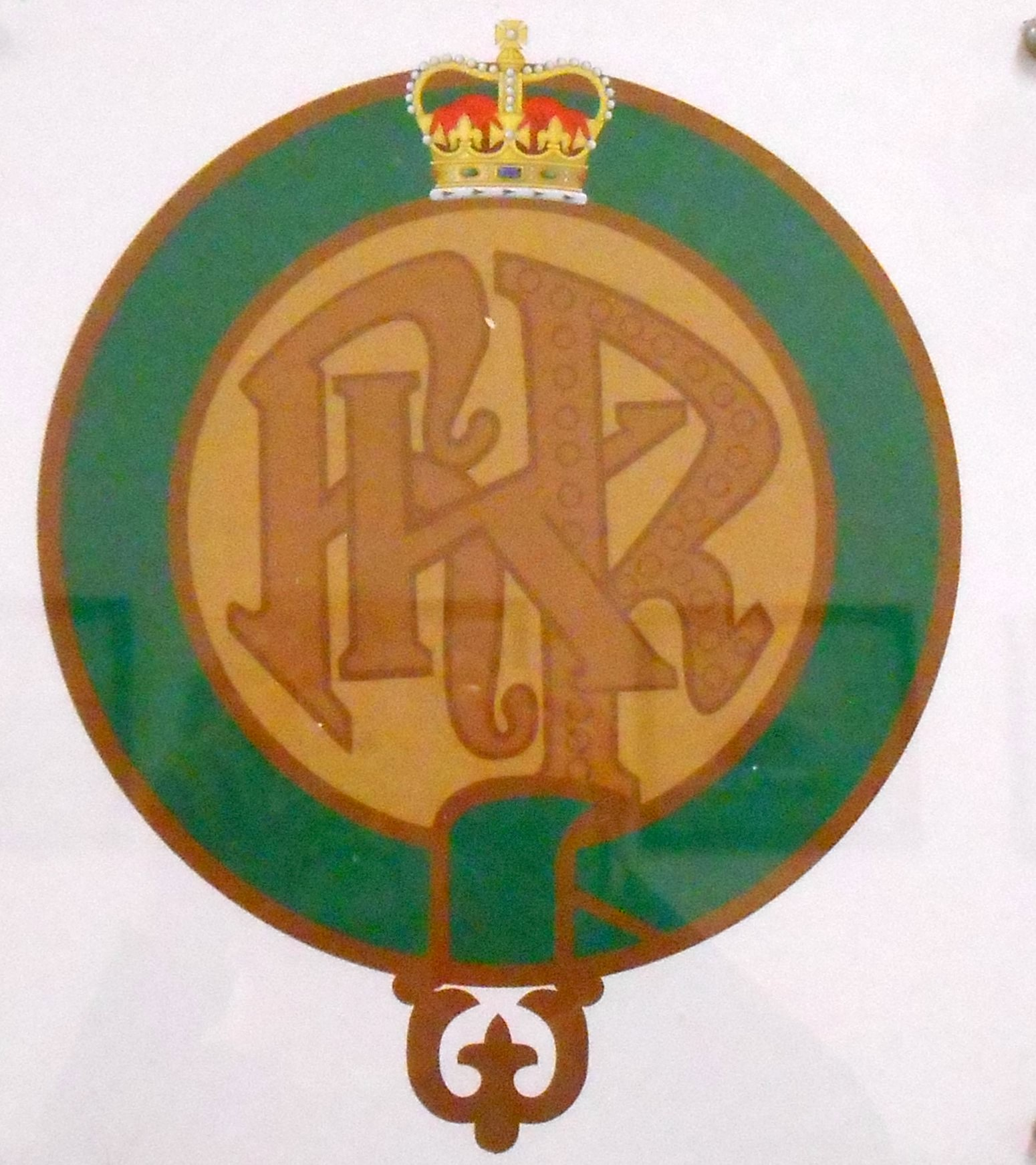
- Industry: Railways
- Founded: 1882
- Defunct: 1 January 1943
- Successor: Oudh and Tirhut Railway
- Headquarters: India
- Area served: Northern India
- Services: Rail transport

Rohilkund and Kumaon Railway (R&KR) was a metre-gauge railway in India covering a total network of 592 miles (953 km). It was owned and worked by the Rohilkund and Kumaon Railway Company (registered 6 October 1882). The Rohilkund and Kumaon Railway was transferred to the Government of India and merged into the Oudh and Tirhut Railway on 1 January 1943.

== History ==
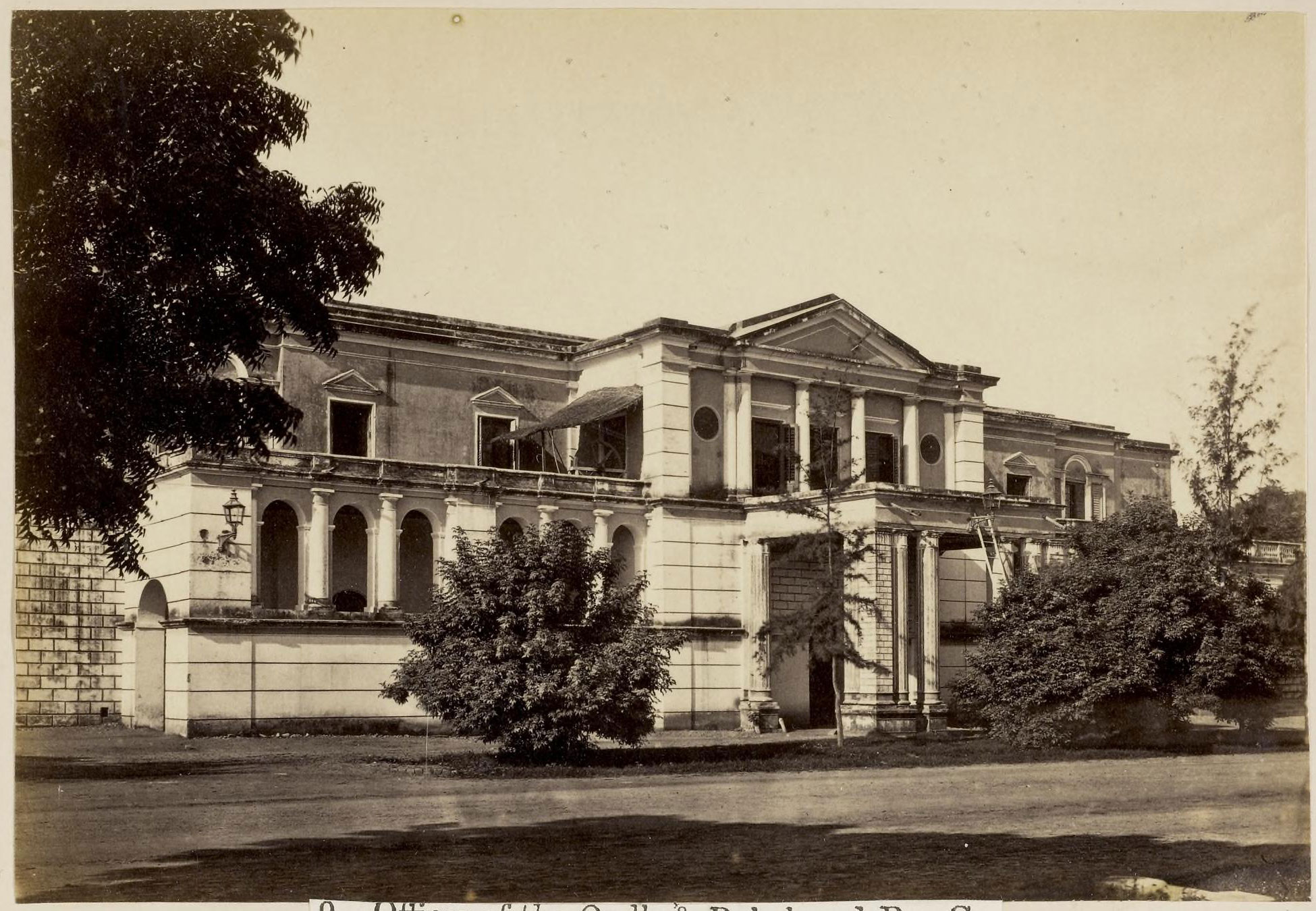
Offices of the Rohilkund and Kumaon Railway Company in Lucknow, 1870s

The company was founded in 1883 by the Scottish railway engineer Alexander Izat who was also the Company Director until 1904.

The original main line from Bhojeepura (near Bareilly) opened in 1884 and ran 54 miles (87 km) in a north-westerly direction to Kathgodam. The railway was progressively extended, and by 1912 its network covered 256 miles (412 km). It also worked the 296 miles (476 km) long Lucknow-Bareilly State Railway.

The R&KR was company owned and worked from formation in 1882. In 1883 Alexander Izat was appointed Director. Prior to this he was employed by the Railway Branch - Public Works Department (PWD) where he had served in various parts of India and was instrumental in initiating and carrying out many metre-gauge extensions. He represented R&KR at the Indian Railway Conference Association and remained as Director, until his retirement in 1904. In 1918 he is recorded as being R&KR Chairman with headquarters in London.

The R&KR remained a private company until nationalisation in 1943, when it was amalgamated with the Bengal and North-Western Railway (B&NWR), with which it had been closely associated, and the Lucknow-Bareilly State Railway, to form the Oudh and Tirhut Railway (O&TR). In turn, in 1952, the Oudh and Tirhut Railway became part of 'North Eastern Railway', a zone of Indian Railways.

The R&KR had working agreements with both the metre-gauge Lucknow-Bareilly State Railway and the narrow-gauge Powayan Light Railway. The three railways used shared facilities but retained separate identities.

=== Lines operated by R&KR ===
- Bhojeepura-Kathgodam R&KR Mainline from Bhojeepura (near Bareilly) to Kathgodam, 1884; 54 miles (87 km)
- Kasganj Extension Line from Bareilly to Soron, 1885; to Kasganj, 1906; 63 miles (101 km)
- Ramnagar Extension Line from Moradabad to Ramnagar, 1907–8; 48 miles (77 km)
- Kashipur Extension Line from Lalkua to Kashipur, 1907; 36 miles (58 km)
- Shahjahanpur Extension Line from Pilibhit 1911; reaching Shahjahanpur 1916; 56 miles (90 km)
- Lucknow-Bareilly State Railway, from 1891, a metre-gauge railway, which formed an alternative Northern Loop between the cities of Lucknow and Bareilly to the broad-gauge main line of the Oudh and Rohilkhand Railway. The metre-gauge network of 198 miles (319 km) in 1891 was extended to 312 miles (502 km) by 1914.
- Powayan Light Railway, from 17 December 1900, a 2-foot-6-inch (760 mm) narrow-gauge line of 39 miles (63 km) length.
- Philibhit-Sitapur Railway, sanctioned for survey in 1905–1906; metre-gauge line from Pilibhit-Bisalpur to Shahjahanpur and then to Sitapur, a length of about 105 miles (169 km). The 'Philibhit - Shahjahanpur Section’ was constructed by R&KR as Shahjahanpur Extension Lin, opened 1911-16 - see above; the extension to Sitapur was constructed in 1916.
- Dudhwa Branch Extension and Ramnager Ghat Extension, proposed in 1895 by the Agents, the R&KR, on behalf of the Lucknow-Bareilly State Railway (LBSR).
- Pilibhit-Barmedo Branch, surveyed in 1903 by the Agents, the R&KR, on behalf of the Lucknow-Bareilly State Railway (LBSR)

=== Rolling stock ===
In 1936, the company owned 76 locomotives, 230 coaches and 2845 goods wagons.

== Classification ==
It was labeled as a Class I railway according to Indian Railway Classification System of 1926.

== Conversion to broad gauge ==
The railway lines were converted to 1,676 mm (5 ft 6 in) broad gauge starting from 1990s to 2010s.
