= Trans-Gomti area =

Sub-city in Lucknow, Uttar Pradesh, India

Coordinates: 26.873°N 80.982°E

Trans-Gomti area is an important sub-city in the Lucknow city with its population slightly less than the old city. It is relatively more developed than the mainland due to the contemporary planning. It is divided into the following areas:

- Mahanagar
- Vikas Nagar
- Nirala Nagar
- Aliganj
- Janakipuram
- Indira Nagar
- Chinhat
- Gomti Nagar

== Demographics ==
With a population of slightly more than one million, it is the most literate area in the entire Uttar Pradesh state. It mostly has middle class professionals and is more cosmopolitan than the main city.

== Economy ==
It constitutes the central business area of Eastern Uttar Pradesh with many BPOs, R&D centres, IT, and ITES centres. It also has the Indira Gandhi Pratishthan which is the largest science and technology centre in Uttar Pradesh. Most of the economic activity happens in Indira Nagar-Gomti Nagar and Sitapur Road while rest of the area is used for residential purpose.

The institutional area in Vibhuti Khand, a locality in Gomti Nagar, is fast developing as the second Central Business District of Lucknow.

== Education ==
Educational institutions include:

1. Indian Institute of Management
2. Institute of Engineering and Technology
3. Babu Banarasi Das University
4. Lucknow University
5. Colvin Taluqdars' College
6. Central School
7. City Montessori School
8. Delhi Public School
9. CIMAP
10. St Dominic Savio College
