= Malukpur =

Village in Uttar Pradesh, India

Malukpur Malūkpur
- Village
- Location in Uttar Pradesh, India Malukpur (India)
- Coordinates: 26.80113°N 81.05392°E
- Country: India
- State: Uttar Pradesh
- District: Lucknow

Area
  - Total: 1.028 km^{2} (0.397 sq mi)
- Elevation: 121 m (397 ft)

Population (2011)
  - Total: 1,104
  - Density: 1,074/km^{2} (2,781/sq mi)

Languages
  - Official: Hindi
- Time zone: UTC+5:30 (IST)

Malukpur, also spelled Malookpur, is a village in Gosainganj block of Lucknow district, Uttar Pradesh, India. As of 2011, its population is 1,104, in 177 households. It is the seat of a gram panchayat.
