= Bangaon (Kamrup) =

- Block
- Location in Assam, India Bangaon (India)
- Coordinates: 26.45°N 91.61°E
- Country: India
- State: Assam
- Region: Western Assam
- District: Kamrup

Government
  - Body: Gram panchayat

Languages
  - Official: Assamese
- Time zone: UTC+5:30 (IST)
- PIN: 781141
- Vehicle registration: AS
- Website: kamrup.nic.in

Bangaon is a Block(MCB) in Kamrup rural district, in the state of Assam, India, situated in north bank of river Brahmaputra.

== Transport ==
The village is near Boko and connected to nearby towns and cities like Guwahati by National Highway 37 regular buses and other modes of transportation and parts of country by BAMUNI GAON (BMGN) Railway Station.

== See also ==
- Jambari
- Bamunigaon
