= Manirul Islam (Indian politician) =

Indian politician

Personal details
- Party: Trinamool Congress (until 2026)
- Occupation: Cultivation

Manirul Islam is an Indian politician from West Bengal.

He contested from Farakka Assembly constituency on Trinamool ticket and won in the 2021 West Bengal Legislative Assembly election.
