= Mahona =

Land of Murao Zamindar's

- Town
- Location in Uttar Pradesh, India
- Coordinates: 26°32′1″N 81°35′15″E
- Country: India
- State: Uttar Pradesh
- District: Amethi

Population (2001)
  - Total: 6,967

Languages
  - Official: Hindi
- Time zone: UTC+5:30 (IST)
- Postal code: 227811
- Vehicle registration: UP-36

Mahona is a town and a Grampanchayat in Amethi District in the Indian state of Uttar Pradesh.

== Demographics ==
As of 2001 India census, mahona had a population of 6,967. Males constitute 53% of the population and females 47%. Mahona has an average literacy rate of 35%, lower than the national average of 59.5%: male literacy is 42%, and female literacy is 27%. In mahona, 19% of the population is under 6 years of age.
