= Badshah Nagar =

Residential area of Lucknow, in India

Badshah Nagar (Urdu: بادشاہ نگر) is a residential area in trans-gomti of Lucknow near Badshah Nagar railway station. Badshah Nagar postal code is 226007.

Most of the buildings in Badshah Nagar are constructed by the government for its employees. Apart from residential buildings there are some commercial constructions also present.
