= Farakka Assembly constituency =

Farakka
- Constituency No. 55 for the West Bengal Legislative Assembly
- Interactive Map Outlining Farakka Assembly Constituency

Constituency details
- Country: India
- Region: East India
- State: West Bengal
- District: Murshidabad
- Lok Sabha constituency: Maldaha Dakshin
- Established: 1951
- Total electors: 227,549
- Reservation: None

Member of Legislative Assembly
- 18th West Bengal Legislative Assembly
- Incumbent Motab Shaikh
- Party: INC
- Elected year: 2026

Farakka Assembly constituency is an assembly constituency in Murshidabad district in the Indian state of West Bengal.

== Overview ==
As per orders of the Delimitation Commission, No. 55 Farakka Assembly constituency covers Farakka community development block and Gajinagar Malancha and Kanchantala gram panchayats of Samserganj community development block.

Farakka Assembly constituency is part of No. 8 Maldaha Dakshin (Lok Sabha constituency). It was earlier part of Jangipur (Lok Sabha constituency).

== Members of the Legislative Assembly ==
Year	Member	Party
1951	Mahammad Giasuddin	Indian National Congress
1957	Mahammad Giasuddin	Indian National Congress
1962	Mahammad Giasuddin	Indian National Congress
1967	T. A. N. Nabi	Bangla Congress
1969	Sk. Sahadat Hossain	Bangla Congress
1971	Jerat Ali	Communist Party of India (Marxist)
1972	Jerat Ali	Communist Party of India (Marxist)
1977	Abul Hasnat Khan	Communist Party of India (Marxist)
1982	Abul Hasnat Khan	Communist Party of India (Marxist)
1987	Abul Hasnat Khan	Communist Party of India (Marxist)
1991	Abul Hasnat Khan	Communist Party of India (Marxist)
1996	Mainul Haque	Indian National Congress
2001	Mainul Haque	Indian National Congress
2006	Mainul Haque	Indian National Congress
2011	Mainul Haque	Indian National Congress
2016	Mainul Haque	Indian National Congress
2021	Manirul Islam	Trinamool Congress
2026	Motab Shaikh	Indian National Congress

== Election result ==
=== 2026 ===
2026 West Bengal Legislative Assembly election: Farakka
Party	Candidate	Votes	%	±%
INC	Motab Shaikh	63,050	36.06	▲16.64
BJP	Sunil Chowdhury	54,857	31.38	▲8.65
AITC	Amirul Islam	47,256	27.03	▼27.86
CPI(M)	Mojaffar Hossain	4,177	2.39	
NOTA	None of the above	1,783	1.02	▲0.14
Majority		8,193	4.68	▼27.48
Turnout		174,841	96.17	▲14.24
INC gain from AITC		Swing		

=== 2021 ===
West Bengal assembly elections, 2021: Farakka constituency
Party	Candidate	Votes	%	±%
AITC	Manirul Islam	102,319	54.89	
BJP	Hemanta Ghosh	42,374	22.73	
INC	Mainul Haque	36,205	19.42	
NOTA	None of the above	1,638	0.88	
Majority		59,945	32.16	
Turnout		186,424	81.93	
AITC gain from INC		Swing		

=== 2016 ===
In the 2016 elections, Mainul Haque of Indian National Congress defeated his nearest rival Md. Mustafa of Trinamool Congress.

West Bengal assembly elections, 2016: Farakka constituency
Party	Candidate	Votes	%	±%
INC	Mainul Haque	83,314	51.05	+12.38
AITC	Md. Mustafa	55,147	33.79	
BJP	Indranath Upadhyay	15,952	9.77	−9.84
WPOI	Dr. Rejaul Karim	4,022	2.46	
BSP	Khairul Alam	1,909	1.17	+0.20
NOTA	None of the above	1,840	1.13	
Independent	Mir Mainul Haque	1,014	0.62	
Turnout		163,198	84.99	−4.05
INC hold		Swing		

=== 2011 ===
2011 West Bengal Legislative Assembly election: Farakka
Party	Candidate	Votes	%	±%
INC	Mainul Haque	52,780	38.77	
CPI(M)	Abdus Salam	48,041	35.29	
BJP	Hemanta Ghosh	26,696	19.61	
Independent	Sanu Seikh	3,914	2.88	
BSP	Satrughna Rabi Das	1,314	0.97	
IUC	Sofikul Islam	1,250	0.92	
SDPI	Mahah Saijul Hoque	1,122	0.82	
IUML	Baidul Hoque	1,010	0.74	
Majority		4,739	3.48	
Turnout		136,127	88.92	
INC hold		Swing		

=== 2006 ===
2006 West Bengal Legislative Assembly election: Farakka
Party	Candidate	Votes	%	±%
INC	Mainul Haque	59,514	48.91	
CPI(M)	Abdus Salam	52,789	43.38	
AITC	Somen Pandey	4,483	3.68	
Independent	Parichay Dasgupta	2,471	2.03	
IUML	Azizur Rahaman	1,889	1.55	
Majority		6,725	5.53	
Turnout		121,673		
INC hold		Swing		

=== 2001 ===
2001 West Bengal Legislative Assembly election: Farakka
Party	Candidate	Votes	%	±%
INC	Mainul Haque	57,193	50.54	
CPI(M)	Mir Tarekul Islam	46,006	40.65	
BJP	Sasti Charan Ghosh	5,419	4.79	
Independent	Jerat Ali	2,324	2.05	
IUML	Dr. Nurul Islam	2,221	1.96	
Majority		11,187	9.89	
Turnout		113,296	75.31	
INC hold		Swing		

=== 1996 ===
1996 West Bengal Legislative Assembly election: Farakka
Party	Candidate	Votes	%	±%
INC	Mainul Haque	53,480	46.44	
CPI(M)	Abul Hasnat Khan	45,917	39.87	
BJP	Sasti Charan Ghosh	11,035	9.58	
Independent	Parichay Das Gupta	1,863	1.62	
BSP	Khairul Alam	893	0.78	
Independent	Ataur Rahaman	831	0.72	
IUML	Abdul Malek	524	0.46	
Independent	Nuran Nabi	484	0.42	
Independent	Amal Kumar Biswas	131	0.11	
Majority		7,563	6.57	
Turnout		117,582	84.18	
Swing to INC from CPI(M)		Swing		

=== 1991 ===
1991 West Bengal Legislative Assembly election: Farakka
Party	Candidate	Votes	%	±%
CPI(M)	Abul Hasnat Khan	36,934	38.56	
INC	Mainul Haque	31,054	32.42	
BJP	Sasti Charan Ghosh	22,771	23.77	
Independent	Zerat Ali	2,374	2.48	
Independent	Yasin Ali	796	0.83	
JP	Khairul	749	0.78	
IUML	Azizur Rahman	612	0.64	
BSP	Satrughan Rabidas	497	0.52	
Majority		5,880	6.14	
Turnout		97,898	79.24	
CPI(M) hold		Swing		

=== 1987 ===
1987 West Bengal Legislative Assembly election: Farakka
Party	Candidate	Votes	%	±%
CPI(M)	Abul Hasnat Khan	35,216	43.85	
INC	Mainul Shaikh	26,112	32.51	
BJP	Sasti Charan	10,239	12.75	
Independent	Jerat Ali	5,471	6.81	
IUML	Maulana Azizur Rahman	3,281	4.08	
Majority		9,104	11.34	
Turnout		81,701	78.60	
CPI(M) hold		Swing		

=== 1982 ===
1982 West Bengal Legislative Assembly election: Farakka
Party	Candidate	Votes	%	±%
CPI(M)	Abul Hasnat Khan	29,702	44.48	
Independent	Jerat Ali	16,434	24.61	
Independent	Md. Israil	10,352	15.50	
BJP	Sasti Charan Ghosh	10,287	15.41	
Majority		13,268	19.87	
Turnout		68,580	78.09	
CPI(M) hold		Swing		

=== 1977 ===
1977 West Bengal Legislative Assembly election: Farakka
Party	Candidate	Votes	%	±%
CPI(M)	Abul Hasnat Khan	14,836	36.77	
Independent	Jerar Ali	11,242	27.86	
INC	Wazed Ali	7,752	19.21	
Independent	Jagannath Gupta	2,963	7.34	
Independent	Wobaidur Rahaman	2,394	5.93	
JP	Tofail Hossain Syed	968	2.40	
IUML	Israil	190	0.47	
Majority		3,594	8.91	
Turnout		41,302	56.00	
CPI(M) hold		Swing		

=== 1972 ===
1972 West Bengal Legislative Assembly election: Farakka
Party	Candidate	Votes	%	±%
CPI(M)	Jerat Ali	20,787	44.10	
INC	Md Wazed Ali	19,112	40.55	
IUML	Sohidul Alam	7,234	15.35	
Majority		1,675	3.55	
Turnout		48,576	56.58	
CPI(M) hold		Swing		

=== 1971 ===
1971 West Bengal Legislative Assembly election: Farakka
Party	Candidate	Votes	%	±%
CPI(M)	Jerat Ali	16,662	38.61	
Independent	Johad Ahmed	15,849	36.73	
INC	Sudhir Kumar Saha	7,002	16.23	
SUCI	Siddique Hossain	1,684	3.90	
Bangla Congress	Md. Mohsin	1,071	2.48	
INC(O)	Fazletannesa	883	2.05	
Majority		813	1.88	
Turnout		45,880	54.14	
Swing to CPI(M) from Bangla Congress		Swing		

=== 1969 ===
1969 West Bengal Legislative Assembly election: Farakka
Party	Candidate	Votes	%	±%
Bangla Congress	Sk. Sahadat Hossain	12,951	31.83	
PML	Zohad Ahmed	12,272	30.16	
INC	Nur Mohammad Biswas	7,283	17.90	
ABJS	Satyadeb Gupta	6,926	17.02	
Independent	T. A. Nuran Nabi	976	2.40	
SWA	M. A. Hannan Alhaj	285	0.70	
Majority		679	1.67	
Turnout		42,183	53.33	
Bangla Congress hold		Swing		

=== 1967 ===
1967 West Bengal Legislative Assembly election: Farakka
Party	Candidate	Votes	%	±%
Bangla Congress	T. A. N. Nabi	18,812	59.56	
INC	B. M. W. Ali	7,194	22.78	
Independent	B. K. Mandal	2,875	9.10	
Independent	J. Ahmed	2,703	8.56	
Majority		11,618	36.78	
Turnout		34,652	43.66	
Swing to Bangla Congress from INC		Swing		

=== 1962 ===
1962 West Bengal Legislative Assembly election: Farakka
Party	Candidate	Votes	%	±%
INC	Mohamad Giasuddin	10,203	46.18	
SWA	T. A. Nurannabi	6,143	27.80	
Independent	Swadhin Kumar Gupta	4,247	19.22	
Independent	Modashwar Hossain	1,084	4.91	
Independent	Johad Ahammad Biswas	417	1.89	
Majority		4,060	18.38	
Turnout		24,094	38.04	
INC hold		Swing		

=== 1957 ===
1957 West Bengal Legislative Assembly election: Farakka
Party	Candidate	Votes	%	±%
INC	Mahammad Giasuddin	10,835	46.64	
Independent	Sabiruddin Biswas	7,962	34.27	
Independent	Nezamuddin Ahamad	3,114	13.41	
Independent	Mahammad Azizur Rahman	1,319	5.68	
Majority		2,873	12.37	
Turnout		23,230	38.02	
INC hold		Swing		

=== 1951 ===
1951 West Bengal Legislative Assembly election: Farakka
Party	Candidate	Votes	%	±%
INC	Giasuddin	11,463	48.64	
Independent	Sripati Bhusan Das	5,698	24.18	
Independent	Syed Abul Hossain	4,682	19.87	
Independent	Muralidhar Gupta	1,209	5.13	
Independent	Benoy Bhusan Sarkar	515	2.19	
Majority		5,765	24.46	
Turnout		23,567	36.18	
INC win (new seat)				
