= Mokbul Hossain =

Mokbul Hossain or Makbul Hossain (Bengali: মকবুল হোসেন) is a Bengali masculine given name of Arabic origin. It may refer to:

- Mokbul Hossain Sontu (1943–2021), MP for Pabna-2
- Syed Makbul Hossain (1946–2022), MP for Sylhet-2
- Md. Mokbul Hossain (born 1950), MP for Pabna-3
- Mockbul Hossain (1950–2020), businessman and MP for Dhaka-9
- Md. Mokbul Hossain (born 1954), MP for Meherpur-2
- Mohammad Makbul Hossain (born 1961), naval officer
- Makbul Hossain, MP for Chuadanga-1
- Mokbul Hossain, MLA for Sylhet
- Mohammad Maqbool Hossain, MP for Rajshahi-6
- Mollah Maqbool Hossain, MP for Jessore-14
- Md Mokbul Hossain, Ministry of Information and Broadcasting secretary

== See also ==
- Hussein
