= Bagha Municipality =

Municipality in Rajshahi, Bangladesh

Bagha Municipality বাঘা পৌরসভা
- Municipality
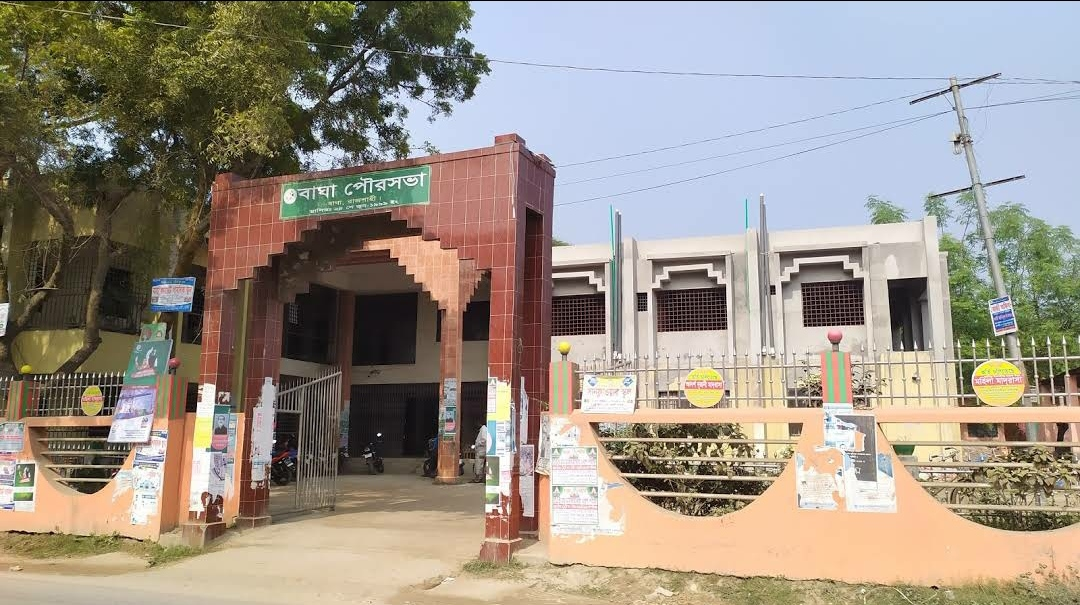

- Location of the Bagha Municipality within Bangladesh
- Coordinates: 24.1957000°N 88.8367300°E
- Country: Bangladesh
- Division: Rajshahi
- District: Rajshahi
- Established: 24 June 1999
- Word: 9

Government
  - Mayor: Abdur Razzak (Bangladesh Nationalist Party)

Area
  - Total: 15.78 km^{2} (6.09 sq mi)

Population (Municipality)
  - Total: 55,000
  - Density: 3,500/km^{2} (9,000/sq mi)
- Time zone: UTC+6:00
- Postal code: 6280

Bagha Municipality mahallah geocode map

Bagha Municipality is a Class A municipality in the Bagha Upazila of Rajshahi District in the Rajshahi Division of Bangladesh.

== Administrative area ==
Ward: 09

Locality: 20

  - Bolihar
  - Chak-Amodpur
  - Milik Bagha
  - Baju Bagha
  - Chak-Chatari
  - Chatari
  - Chak-Narayanpur
  - Koligram
  - Gaopara
  - Hizalpalli
  - Baniyapara
  - Chondipur
  - Murshidpur
  - Jotsayestha
  - Khayerhat
  - Pakuriya
  - Bagsayesta
  - Nischintopur

Mouza: 17

== Area and population ==
Total area: 15.78 km2

Total population(As of census): 75,000

Total population(As of municipality own statistics): 55,000

Number of voters: 27,789 (2008-10-31)

Number of families: 10,270

Number of holdings: 8,899 (Including public/private)

== Education ==
Education rate: 60%

Educational institutions:

- College - 04
- High school - 07
- Primary school - 10
- Madrasah - 01
- Kindergarten - 04

== See also ==
- Bagha Upazila
- Rajshahi District
- Rajshahi Division
- List of municipal corporations in Bangladesh
