= Baju Bagha =

Baju Bagha বাজু বাঘা
- Location in Bangladesh
- Coordinates: 24°13′0″N 88°51′0″E
- Country: Bangladesh
- Division: Rajshahi Division
- District: Rajshahi District

Government
  - Chairman: Adv. Firoz Ahmed Ronzu

Population
  - Total: 16,258 (Almost)
- Time zone: UTC+6 (Bangladesh Time)
- Postal code: 6280
- Website: http://bajubaghaup.rajshahi.gov.bd

Baju Bagha (Bengali: বাজু বাঘা) is a union in Bagha Upazila of Rajshahi District of Bangladesh.

== Representative ==
Current chairman- Adv. Firoz Ahmed Ronzu

List of past chairmen

| Chairman name | In office |
| Nur Mia | |
| Ayen Sarkar | |
| Shishir Pandey | |
| Soban Doctor | |
| Shafiur Rahman Shafi | |
| Mamun Hossain | |
| Faruq Ahmed | |
| Md. Tofazzal Hossain | 2003-2020 |
| Adv. Firoz Ahmed Ronzu | 2020- |

== See also ==
- Rajshahi District
- Bagha Upazila
- Bagha Municipality
