= Polan Sarkar =

Bangladeshi activist (1921–2019)

- পলান সরকার
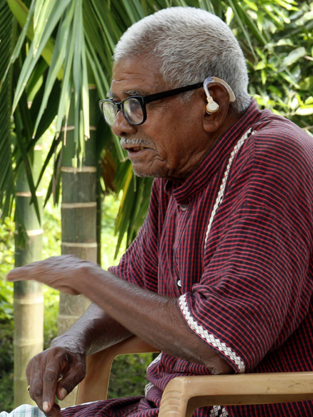
- Sarkar in 2013
- Born: Harez Uddin; 10 September 1921; Natore, Bengal Presidency, British India
- Died: 1 March 2019 (aged 97); Bagha, Rajshahi, Bangladesh
- Known for: Social movement of distributing books for free

Polan Sarkar (10 September 1921 – 1 March 2019) was a Bangladeshi social activist. He received the Ekushey Padak for social service from the Government of Bangladesh in 2011. He started a social movement to distribute books for free. He is known as "Alor Ferrywala," the distributor of light.

== Biography ==
Sarkar was born as Harez Uddin on 10 September 1921, in Bagatipara, Natore. When he was just five months old, his father died. After the incident, he moved to Bausha village with his mother and grandfather. He was admitted to a local school, but could not continue his studies due to his family's financial troubles. Though his passion for studying and reading books did not ebb.

He started to work with the theatre artists in his area. He also developed a habit of buying books from local libraries as well. Within a short time, Polan became fluent in Bangla and was hired to write legal deeds, keep meeting minutes, and write business agreements.

== Death ==
Polan Sarkar died on 1 March 2019. The 98-year-old had been suffering from old age problems. He died surrounded by his loved ones at his home in Bausha village in Bagha, Rajshahi.
