= Bagha Mosque =

Mosque in Bagha, Rajshahi, Bangladesh

- বাঘা মসজিদ
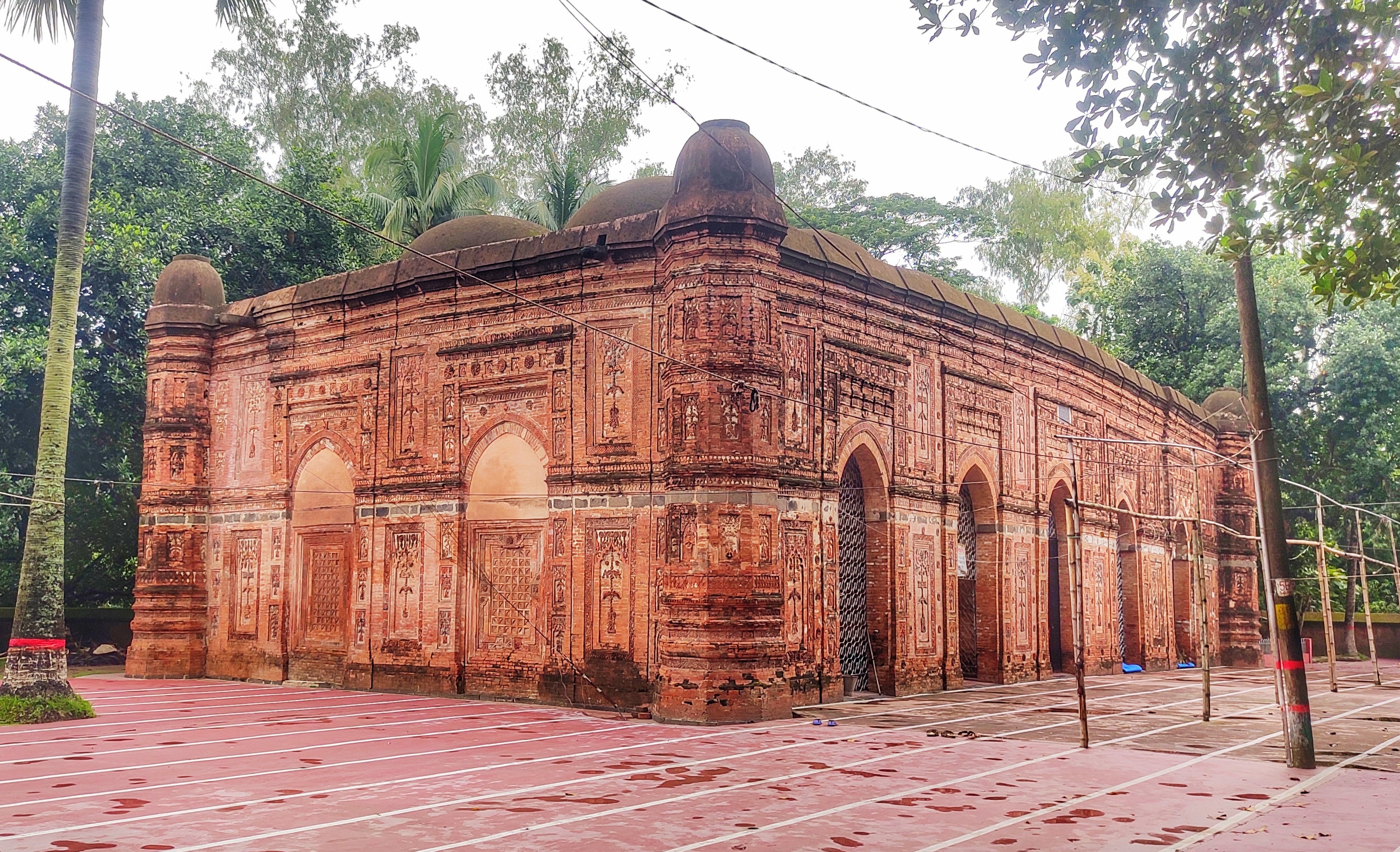
- The mosque in 2021

- Location of the mosque in Bangladesh

Religion
- Affiliation: Islam
- Ecclesiastical or organisational status: Mosque
- Ownership: Bangladeshi Government
- Status: Active

Location
- Location: Bagha, Rajshahi, Rajshahi Division
- Country: Bangladesh
- Coordinates: 24°11′46″N 88°50′21″E

Architecture
- Type: Mosque architecture
- Style: Bengal Sultanate
- Founder: Sultan Nasiruddin Nasrat Shah
- Completed: 930 AH (1523/1524 CE); 1932 (reconstruction)

Specifications
- Capacity: 300 worshipers
- Length: 22.92 m (75.2 ft)
- Width: 12.18 m (40.0 ft)
- Height (max): 7.47 m (24 ft 6 in)
- Dome: 10
- Dome height (outer): 3.7 m (12 ft)
- Dome dia. (outer): 13 m (42 ft)
- Minaret: Four

The Bagha Mosque (Bengali: বাঘা মসজিদ) is a mosque located at Bagha, 40 kilometres (25 mi) southeast of Rajshahi in the Rajshahi Division of Bangladesh.

== History ==
The mosque was built in 930 AH (1523/1524 CE) by Sultan Nusrat Shah, son of Alauddin Shah, the founder of the Husain Shahi dynasty. Later, the mosque was renovated at different times and when the domes of the mosque collapsed, the destroyed mosque was rebuilt in 1897.

Initially, its roof was over ten domes but later those disintegrated. The mosque was constructed with brick and stone plinth. An earthquake in 1897 destroyed all the domes.

== Architecture ==
The Bengal Sultanate-style mosque is located on 256 bighas of land. The courtyard of the mosque has been made 2.4 to 3.0 metres (8 to 10 ft) higher than the plain ground. The pillars and carvings on the north side of the gate have been tormented. The mosque has six pillars inside, and has four arches that are inlaid with artwork. The walls are 1.8 metres (6 ft) wide, and the dome is 13 metres (42 ft) in diameter and 3.7 metres (12 ft) high.

The Bagha Mosque is 22.92 metres (75.2 ft) long, 12.18 metres (40.0 ft) wide, and 7.47 metres (24 ft 6 in) high. Its walls are 2.22 metres (7 ft 3 in) thick. The mosque has a total of 10 domes, four minarets (dome-shaped at the top), and five entrances. The mosque is surrounded by a wall on all sides and has two entrances on either side of the wall. Terracotta designs are present everywhere inside and outside the mosque. The huge lake next to the mosque is also a place of interest. There is a Mazar Sharif next to the mosque.

The masonry of Bagha Mosque is made of lime and surki (powdered brick). There are arches and pillars inside and outside the mosque. There are also innumerable terracotta handicrafts which include mango, lily flowers, herbs and thousands of other handicrafts used in the Persian carving industry. There is a shrine of Shahdaula and his five companions on the north side of the mosque premises.

Nasiruddin Nasrat Shah, son of the independent Sultan of Bengal Alauddin Hussain Shah, dug a dighi (large oblong pond) in front of the mosque for public welfare. Adjacent to the Shahi Mosque, the lake is on 52 bighas of land. There are rows of coconut trees around this tank. Every year during the winter, the area becomes famous for the chirping of innumerable guest birds.

At present four paved banks of the lake have been constructed. There is a tomb of Jahar Khaki Pir adjacent to the mosque. His grave is on the north side of the main shrine. A Mahal pond was discovered under the ground, adjacent to the mosque. Excavations on the west side of the shrine in 1997 found a paved mahal pond measuring 9.1 by 6.1 metres (30 by 20 ft). This pond was connected to the inner palace by a tunnel. He went down the stairs built from three sides. There are many terracotta plaques inside and outside the mosque. Inside the mosque there is a special prayer room built a little higher in the north-west corner. In the area adjacent to this mosque, 'Baghar Mela' is organized every year from the day of Eid-ul-Fitr for three days. This fair has a tradition of 500 years.

== Gallery ==
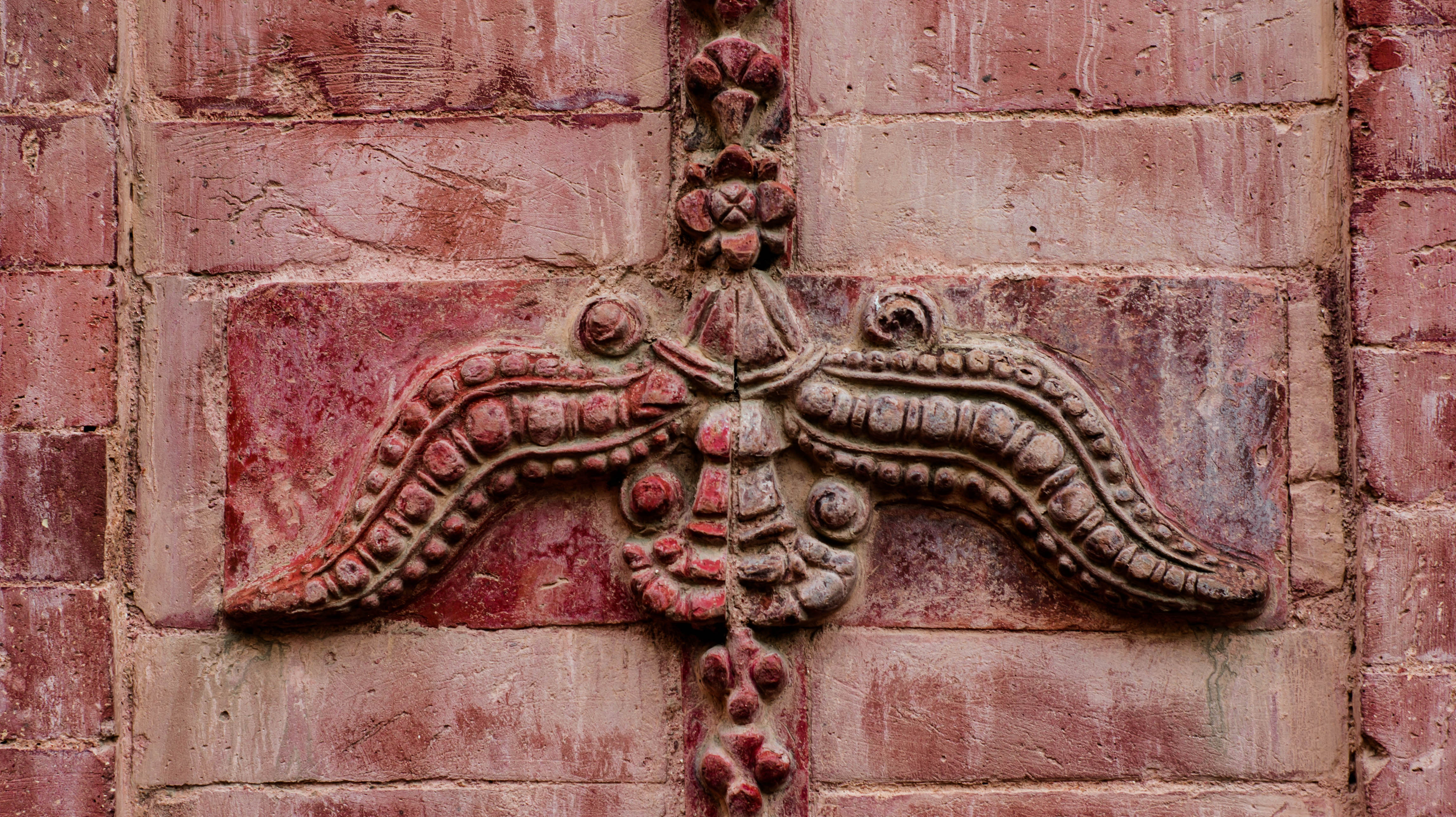

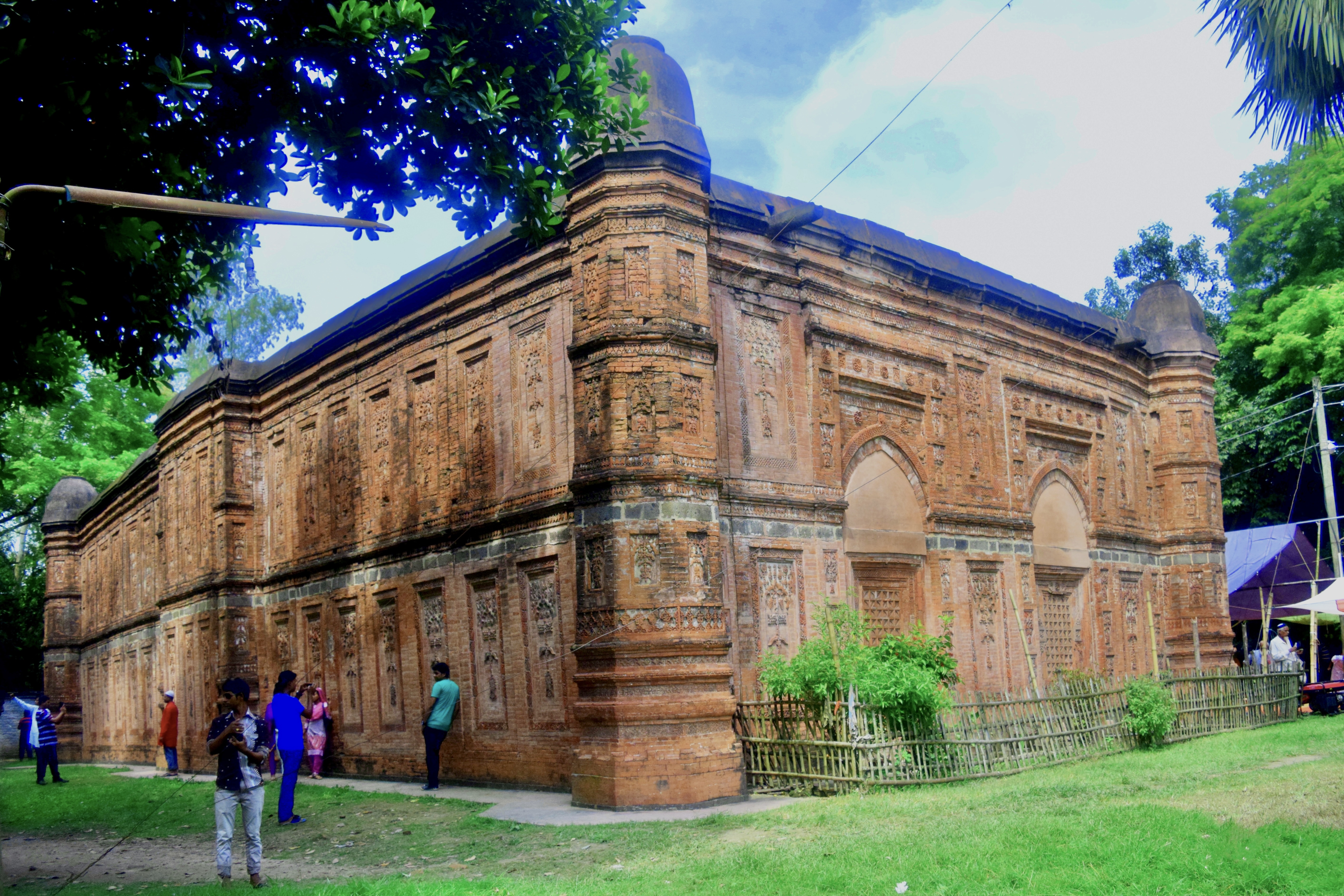

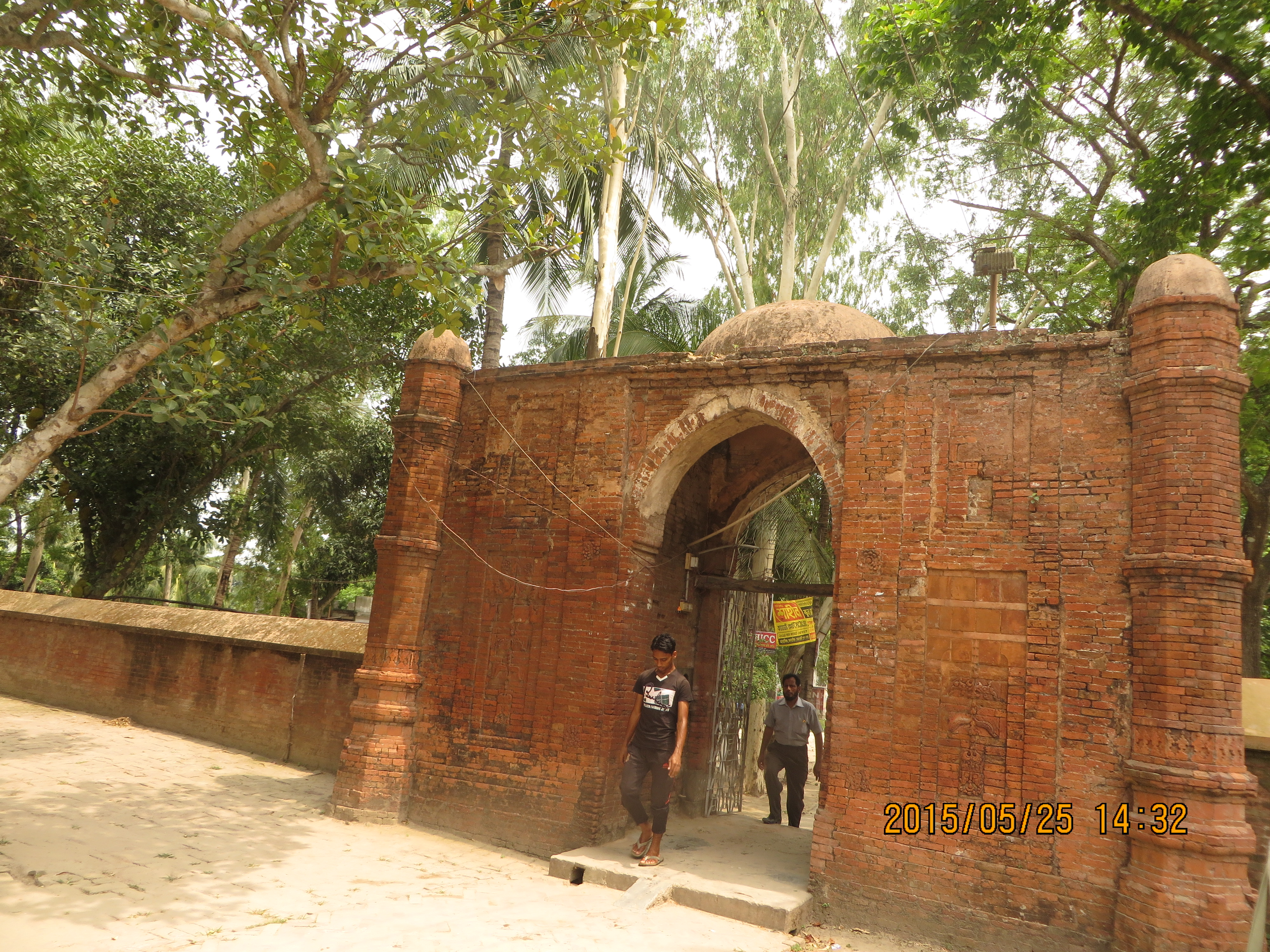

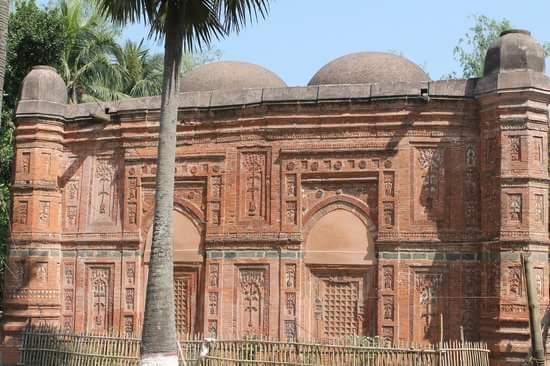

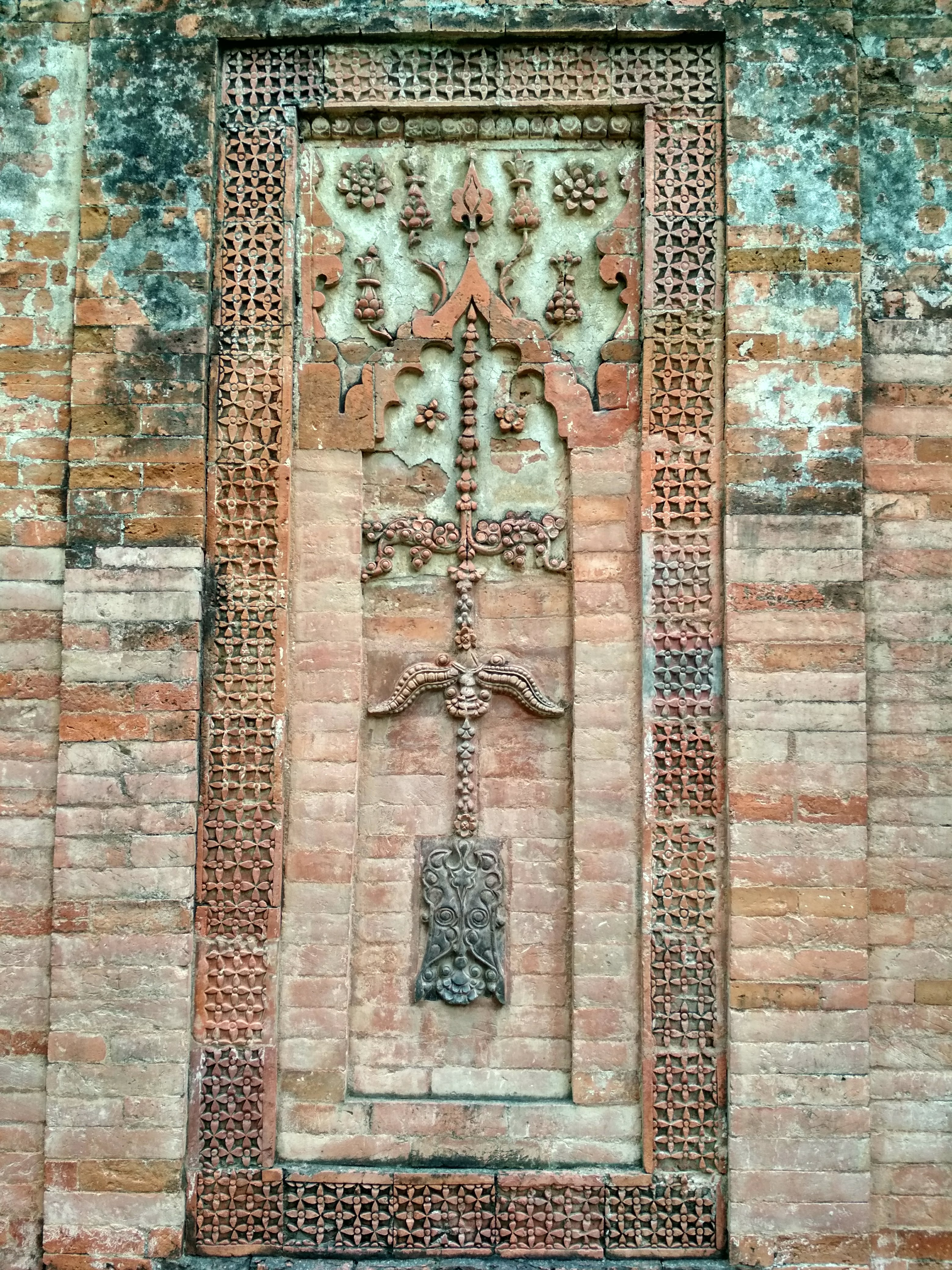

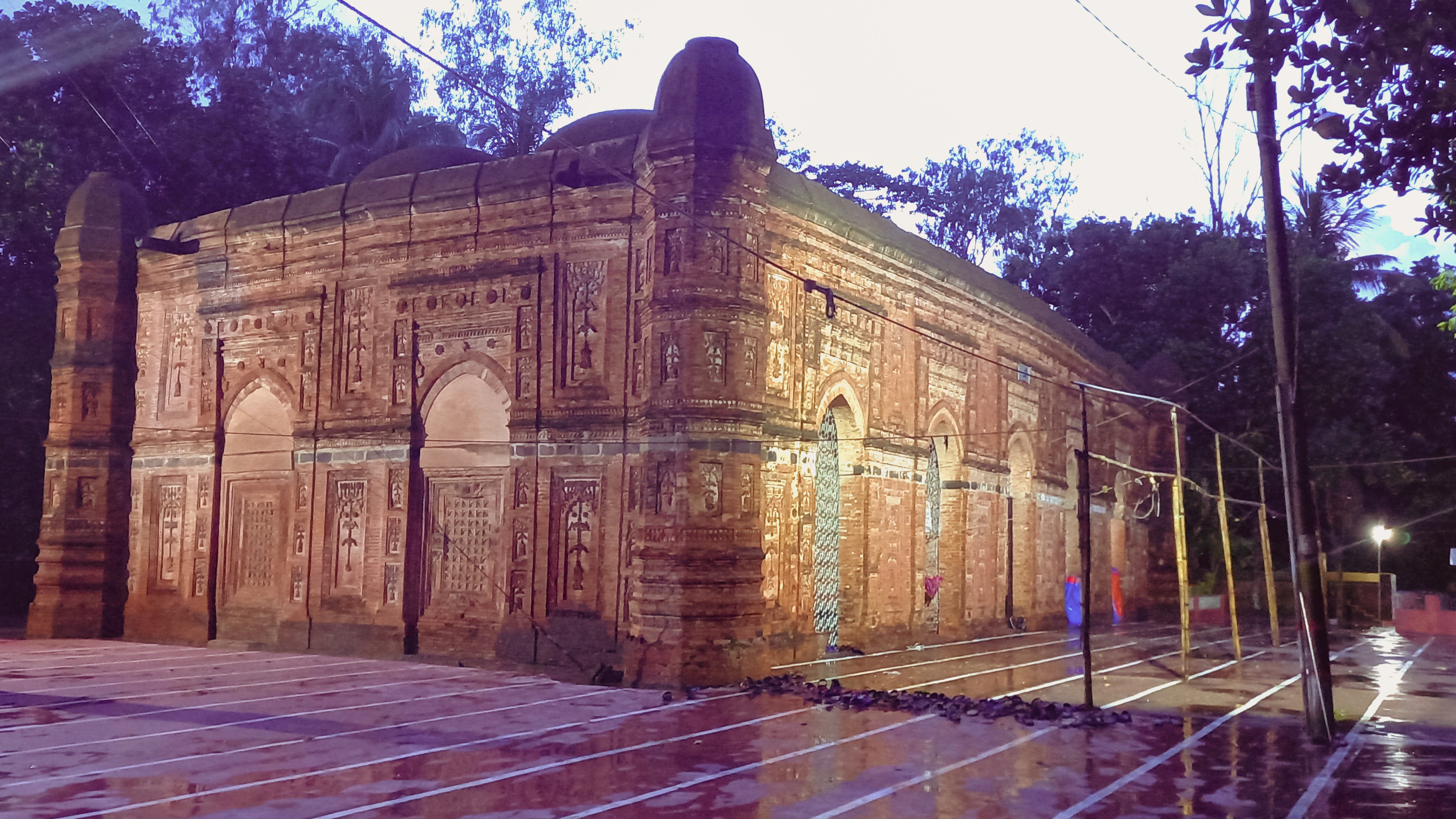

== See also ==
- Islam in Bangladesh
- List of mosques in Bangladesh
- List of archaeological sites in Bangladesh
