= Baraigram Upazila =

Baraigram Upazila বড়াইগ্রাম উপজেলা
- Upazila
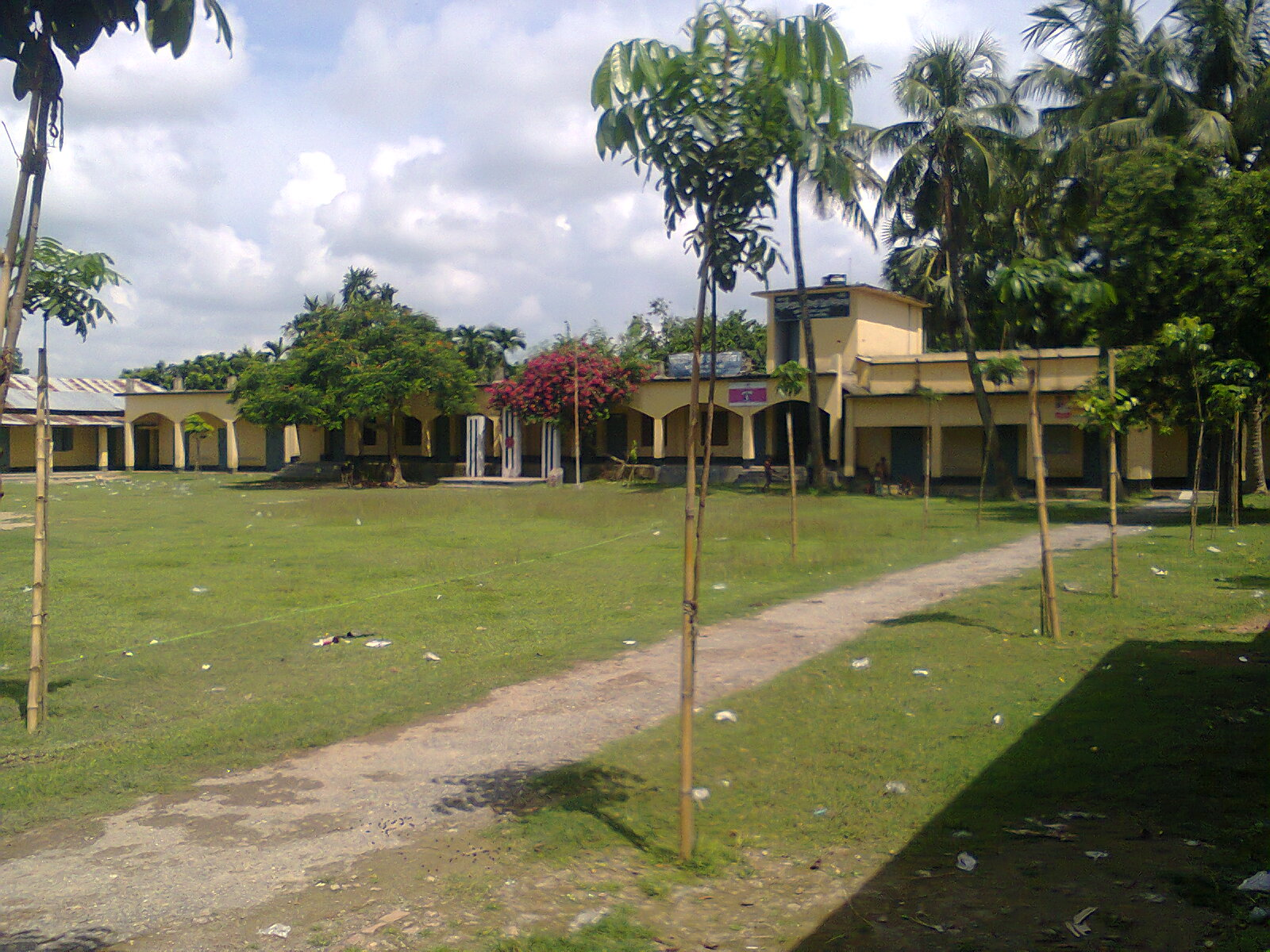
- Baraigram Pilot High School

- Coordinates: 24°18.5′N 89°10.2′E
- Country: Bangladesh
- Division: Rajshahi
- District: Natore

Government
  - 1st elected Upazila Chairman: Md.Abdul Bari
  - Current Chairman: Vacant*

Area
  - Total: 299.60 km^{2} (115.68 sq mi)

Population (2022)
  - Total: 308,923
  - Density: 1,031.1/km^{2} (2,670.6/sq mi)
- Time zone: UTC+6 (BST)
- Postal code: 6430
- Website: baraigram.natore.gov.bd

Baraigram Upazila (Bengali: বড়াইগ্রাম উপজেলা) is an upazila of Natore District, located in the Rajshahi Division of Bangladesh.

== History ==
The Aryan migrations to Lalpur and Baraigram date back to the Gupta period in the 5th century. In the 20th century, a copper plate inscription of King Kumaragupta I was discovered in Baraigram by a Muslim farmer who handed it to Zamindar Ershad Ali Khan Chowdhury who presented it to historian Akshay Kumar Maitreya. The inscription was a land grant from the Gupta emperor to a Brahmin settler.

Baraigram, primarily formed as a thana in 1869, was turned into an upazila on in 1983. Educationist Md.Abdul Bari was the first elected Chairman of Baraigram Upazila. He established many educational institutions in Baraigram, such as Baraigram Pilot High School, Baraigram College, and Baraigram Girls High School.

== Geography ==
Baraigram is located at 24.3083°N 89.1708°E. It has a total area of 299.60 km^{2}. The upazila is bounded by Gurudaspur and Natore sadar upazilas on the north, Atgharia and Ishwardi upazilas on the south, Chatmohar upazila on the east, Lalpur and Bagatipara upazilas on the west.

== Demographics ==
Religions in Baraigram Upazila (2022)
Religion	Percent
Islam	94.48%
Hinduism	3.61%
Christianity	1.90%
Other or not stated	0.01%

According to the 2022 Bangladeshi census, Baraigram Upazila had 84,374 households and a population of 308,923. 8.62% of the population were under 5 years of age. Baraigram had a literacy rate (age 7 and over) of 72.38%: 74.08% for males and 70.76% for females, and a sex ratio of 96.49 males for every 100 females. 66,706 (21.59%) lived in urban areas.

According to the 2011 Census of Bangladesh, Baraigram Upazila had 70,104 households and a population of 279,672. 56,853 (20.33%) were under 10 years of age. Baraigram had a literacy rate (age 7 and over) of 50.01%, compared to the national average of 51.8%, and a sex ratio of 1016 females per 1000 males. 39,523 (14.13%) lived in urban areas. Ethnic population was 1,318 (0.47%).

According to the 2001 Bangladesh census, Baraigram had a population of 244,821; male constituted 125,399, female 119,422; Muslim constituted 228,205, Hindu 10,296, Christian 6,290, Buddhist 13 and others 17. Indigenous communities such as Pahari, Munda, Oraon, Mahato belong to this upazila.

As of the 1991 Bangladesh census, the upazila had a population of 230,480. Males constituted 50.85% of the population, and females 49.15%. This Upazila's eighteen up population is 108,842. Baraigram had an average literacy rate of 25.3% (7+ years), and the national average of 32.4% literate.

== Administration ==
Baraigram Upazila mauza geocode map

Baraigram, primarily formed as a thana in 1869, was turned into an upazila on in 1983.

The upazila is divided into Baraigram Municipality, Bonpara Municipality, and seven union parishads: Baraigram, Chandai, Gopalpur, Joari, Majgoan, Nagor, and Zonail. The union parishads are subdivided into 152 mauzas and 169 villages.

Baraigram Municipality and Bonpara Municipality are each subdivided into 9 wards.

== See also ==
- Upazilas of Bangladesh
- Districts of Bangladesh
- Divisions of Bangladesh
