= Milik Bagha =

Milik Bagha মিলিক বাঘা
- Location in Bangladesh
- Coordinates: 24°12′0″N 88°51′0″E
- Country: Bangladesh
- Division: Rajshahi Division
- District: Rajshahi District
- Time zone: UTC+6 (Bangladesh Time)
- Postal code: 6280

Milik Bagha (Bengali: মিলিক বাঘা) is a village in Bagha Upazila of Rajshahi District of Bangladesh.
