= Lalpur Upazila =

Administrative area in Rajshahi, Bangladesh

Lalpur Upazila লালপুর উপজেলা
- Upazila of Bangladesh
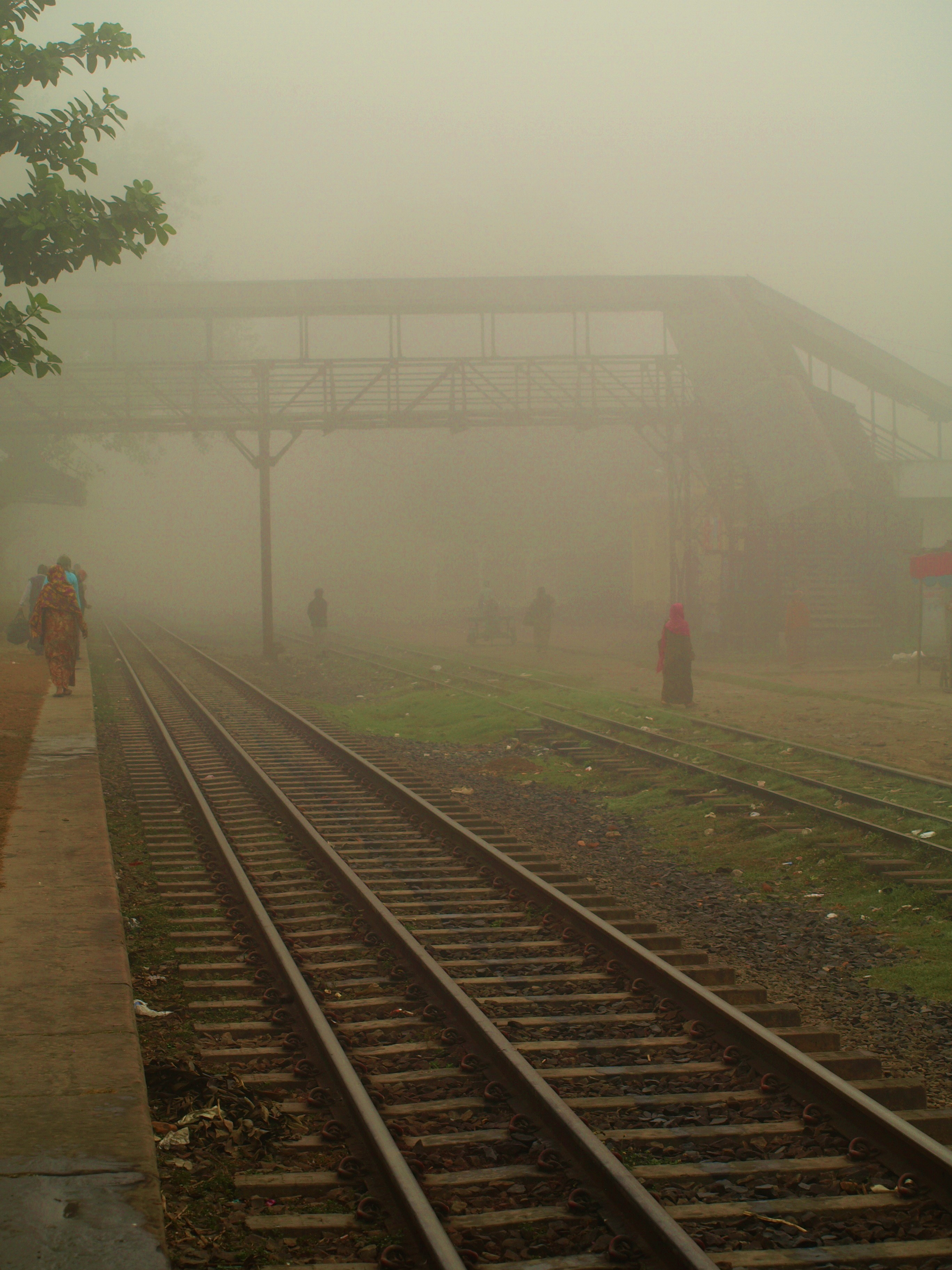
- Azimnagar Railway Station in Lalpur Upazila

- Coordinates: 24°11′N 88°58.5′E
- Country: Bangladesh
- Division: Rajshahi
- District: Natore

Government
  - MP (Natore-1): Advocate Abul Kalam Azad
  - Upazila Chairman: Ishaq Ali

Area
  - Total: 327.92 km^{2} (126.61 sq mi)

Population (2022)
  - Total: 306,357
  - Density: 934.24/km^{2} (2,419.7/sq mi)
- Demonym: Lalpuri
- Time zone: UTC+6 (BST)
- Postal code: 6420
- Area code: 0771
- Website: lalpur.natore.gov.bd

Lalpur Upazila mauza geocode map

Lalpur Upazila (Bengali: লালপুর উপজেলা) is an upazila of Natore District, located the Rajshahi Division of Bangladesh.

== History ==
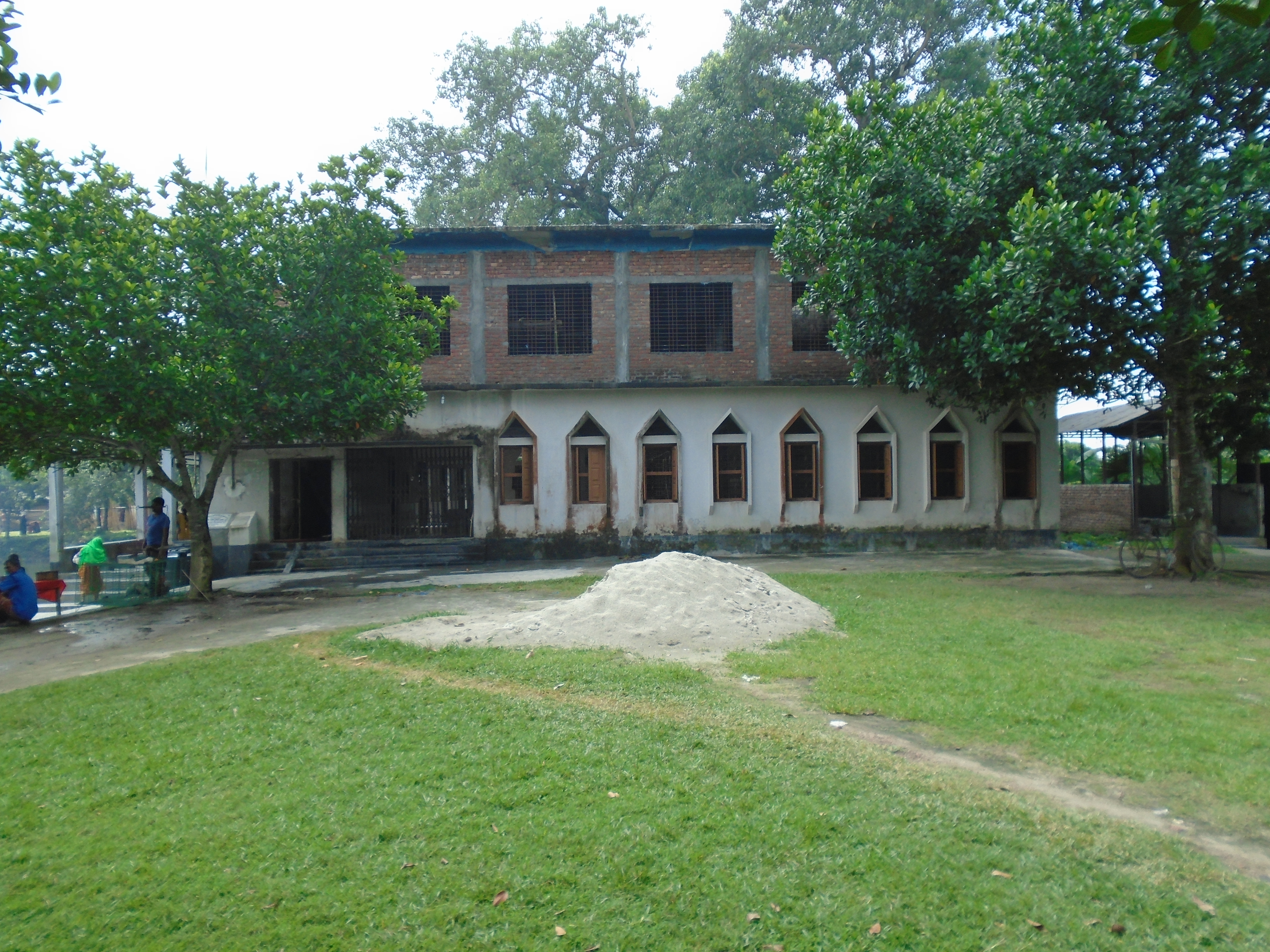
The Bhellabaria Mosque is situated within the dargah complex of Shah Baghu Dewan, a Sufi saint of greater Rajshahi.

According to the Imperial Gazetteer of India, all of ancient Natore was beel (wetland) with the exception of Lalpur. The Aryan migrations to Lalpur and Baraigram date back to the Gupta period in the 5th century. During the reign of the Palas and Senas, Lalpur developed into an important administrative centre of Varendra and maintained river communication with Krishnanagar, Nadia. The Naodapara village near Salampur in Lalpur was home to a Sena-era fort and victory pillar.

The territories now comprising Lalpur Upazila are home to several shahi mosques, particularly in the villages of Salampur, Mominpur, Baora, Nabirpara and Madhabpur. The Arbab Saraikhana and Mosque complex was constructed after the area was annexed to the Sur Empire in the 16th century. The name of Lalpur is thought to have been derived from Lal Khan, a notable Mughal officer stationed in this area. Lalpur is also home to the mosque and dargah of Shah Baghu Dewan in Bhellabaria, a prominent Bengali Sufi saint from the late Mughal period. Other historic shrines in Lalpur include the mazar (mausoleum) of Imam Shah Alam in Budhpara, the mazar of Burhanuddin Baghdadi in Gopalpur and the shrines of Sona Pir and the Panjpirs. Lalpur was established as a thana in 1869 by the British Raj and hosted indigo factories in Lalpur and Bilmaria during colonial rule.

During the Bangladesh Liberation War of 1971, Bengali freedom fighters clashed with the Pakistan Army in the village of Moyna on 30 March. 80 freedom fighters died in this battle, and 32 were injured. Another clash took place in the village of Danaidaha on 12 April where 10 freedom fighters were killed. The Army undertook on operation on 5 May where they killed 50 workers at the North Bengal Sugar Mills in Lalpur thana, killing a further 5 civilians on Lalpur Road. Another 50 people were killed by the Army at a shooting in Paitarpara on 29 May. The Army were also active in an area near the Lalpur indigo factory, where they killed 22 people on 18 July, and buried 4 people alive the next day. On the following day, they headed towards Ramkrishnapur where they set houses on fire and killed 5 people. 50 people were also killed by the Pakistan Army in Bilmaria Hat on 27 July 1971. On 3 December 1971, days before the independence of Bangladesh, the Army conducted 36 killings in the village of Maheshpur. The status of Lalpur Thana was upgraded to upazila (sub-district) in 1983 as part of the President of Bangladesh Hussain Muhammad Ershad's decentralisation programme.

== Geography ==
Lalpur is located at 24.1833°N 88.9750°E. It has a total area of 327.92 km^{2}. 29 km distance from Natore Sadar. Its Thana Sadar is situated on the bank of the river Padma.

The Upazila is bounded by Bagha Upazila on west, little part of Daulatpur Upazila, Kushtia and Bheramara Upazila on south, Ishwardi Upazila on east, Baraigram Upazila and Bagatipara Upazila on north.

=== Climate ===
It's located in an area which is the hottest in Bangladesh. If temperature comes up to 43 °C in the summer.

All the year round, temperature remains hottest simultaneously. Rainfalls are recorded lowest in this part of Bangladesh.

=== Economy ===
The economy is based on agriculture. Most people are farmers. They produce agriculture crops throughout the year. Paddy, wheat, jute, and sugarcane, are common crops along with potato, pulse fisheries, dairies are the principal crops. North Bengal Sugar Mills in Gopalpur is one of the largest sugar mills in Bangladesh, and produce huge amount of sugar from sugarcane. Farmers also produce huge amounts of date juice in winter and make candy from its remains. Later it is sold to other parts of Bangladesh. Farmers also produce crops for their daily livelihoods. Local varieties of produce include fruits such as mango, jack fruit, banana, guava, black berry, and coconut. After fulfilling their own demand, farmers supply the remainder of their crop to markets all over the country. There are people who live near to Padma; most of time they fish in the river and sell their catches to local fish market to earn money for their living. Many NGOs play a role in national economic growth. These include organizations such as AVA, BRAC, Grameen Bank, SETU, DISHA, UDDIPAN, TMSS and so on.

== Demographics ==
Historical population
Year	Pop. (000)	±%
1981	141	—
1991	230	+63.1%
2001	243	+5.7%
2011	274	+12.8%
2022	306	+11.7%
Source: Bangladesh Bureau of Statistics

Religions in Lalpur Upazila (2022)
Religion	Percent
Islam	95.12%
Hinduism	4.70%
Other or not stated	0.18%

According to the 2022 Bangladeshi census, Lalpur Upazila had 82,039 households and a population of 306,357. 8.78% of the population were under 5 years of age. Lalpur had a literacy rate (age 7 and over) of 72.60%: 72.67% for males and 72.54% for females, and a sex ratio of 97.71 males for every 100 females. 43,152 (14.09%) lived in urban areas.

According to the 2011 Census of Bangladesh, Lalpur Upazila had 66,417 households and a population of 274,405. 55,384 (20.18%) were under 10 years of age. Lalpur had a literacy rate (age 7 and over) of 50.62%, compared to the national average of 51.8%, and a sex ratio of 982 females per 1000 males. 21,042 (7.67%) lived in urban areas. Ethnic population was 1,708 (0.62%).

== Administration ==
Lalpur Thana was formed in 1869 and it was turned into an upazila on 15 April 1983.

Lalpur Upazila is divided into Gopalpur Municipality and ten union parishads: Arbab, Arjunpur, Bilmaria, Chongdhupoil, Duaria, Durduria, Iswardi, Kadamchilan, Lalpur, and Oalia. The union parishads are subdivided into 214 mauzas and 217 villages.

Gopalpur Municipality is subdivided into 9 wards and 16 mahallas.

=== List of chairmen ===
List of Upazila chairmen
Name	Term	Notes
Muhammad Fazlul Haq	1985 - 1990	
Muhammad Abdul Bari	1990 - 1991	
Muhammad Abdur Razzaq	5/3/2009 - 16/4/2014	
Muhammad Harunur Rashid Papu	2014 - 2019	
Ishaq Ali	Present	

== See also ==
- Upazilas of Bangladesh
- Districts of Bangladesh
- Divisions of Bangladesh
