= Charghat Upazila =

Charghat Upazila চারঘাট উপজেলা
- Upazila of Bangladesh
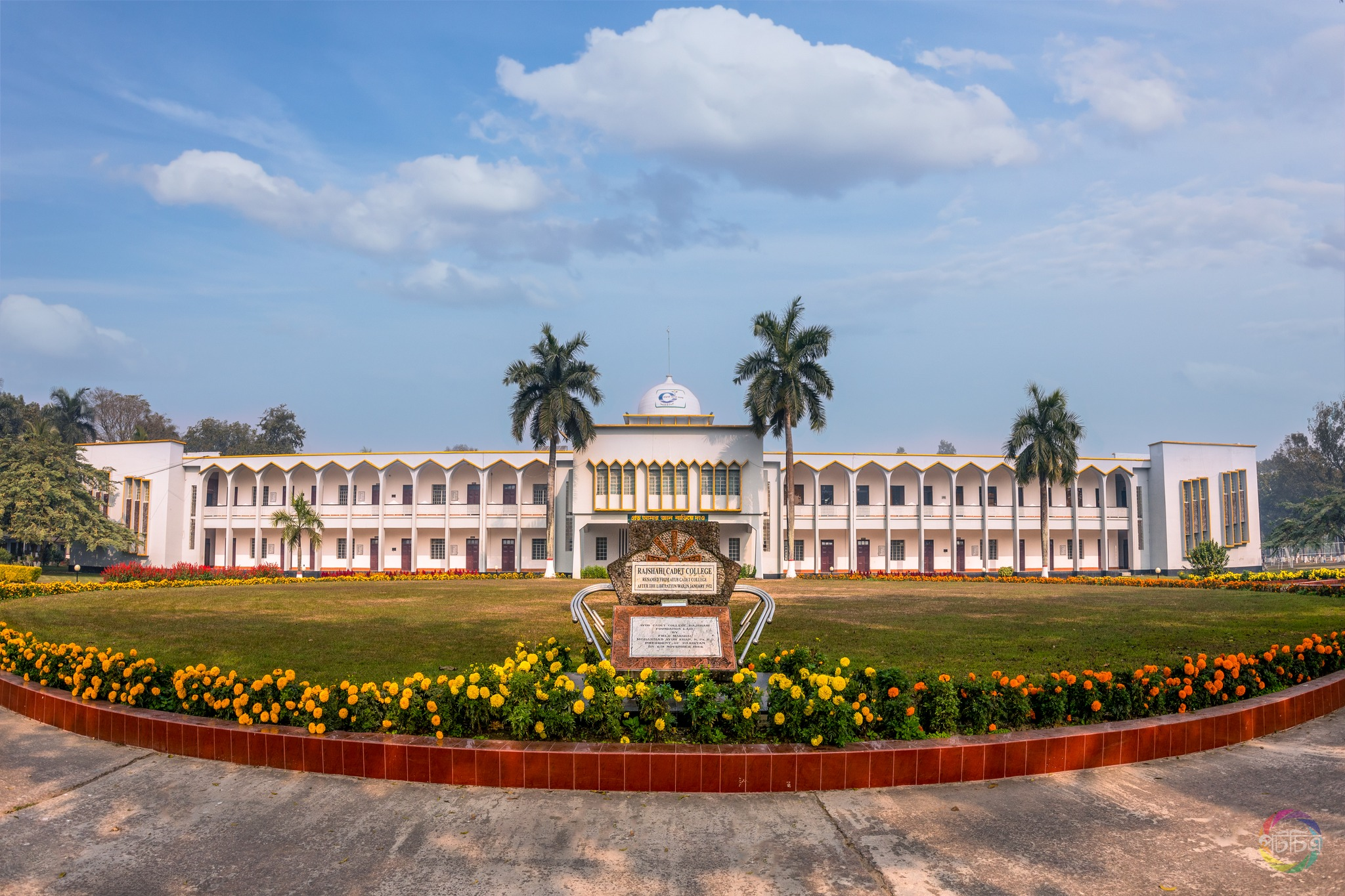
- Rajshahi Cadet College, Charghat upazila

- Coordinates: 24°17′N 88°46.5′E
- Country: Bangladesh
- Division: Rajshahi
- District: Rajshahi

Government
  - MP (Rajshahi-6): Abu Sayeed Chand
  - Upazila Chairman: No Upazila Chairman right now. Kazi Mahmudul Hasan Mamun is no longer the Upazila Chairman of Charghat

Area
  - Total: 164.50 km^{2} (63.51 sq mi)

Population (2022)
  - Total: 224,845
  - Density: 1,366.8/km^{2} (3,540.1/sq mi)
- Time zone: UTC+6 (BST)
- Postal code: 6270
- Website: charghat.rajshahi.gov.bd

Charghat Upazila mauza geocode map

Charghat Upazila (Bengali: চারঘাট উপজেলা) is an upazila of Rajshahi District in the Division of Rajshahi, Bangladesh.

== Background ==
Charghat is located on the bank of the river Padma. Bangladesh Police Academy is located in Sardah area of this upazila. There is also a cadet college here. Charghat was declared Pourashava in 1998. Md. Anwar Hossain was the first chairman under this Pourashava. Charghat is famous for Khoer (an element which is used for taking a green leaf which is called Paan) industry. Mangoes are produced here in plenty. The noted villages of Charghat are Gopalpur, Charghat, Miapur, Babupara, Kakramari, Pirozpur, Sardah and Mokterpur. A sand mine is located here. There is a club named Mokterpur Shobuj Shangha. A charity organization named Botbrikkho is also there which works for the poor people. It was established by Md. Oashimul Bari Oashim, a student of Dhaka University's English Department.

Charghat is a centre of a varieties of cultural programs. Padma Boral Theatre, Projonmo Theatre of Dakra and Botbrikkho are at the helm of arranging the program. Sports are organized here frequently.

== Geography ==
Charghat is located at 24.2833°N 88.7750°E. It has a total area of 164.50 km^{2}.

Charghat Upazila is bounded by Puthia and Paba Upazilas on the north, Bagatipara Upazila in Natore District and Bagha Upazila on the east, Bagha Upazila on the south, and Raninagar II and Jalangi CD Blocks, in Murshidabad district, West Bengal, India, across the Ganges/ Padma, on the west.

== Demographics ==
Religions in Charghat Upazila (2022)
Religion	Percent
Islam	96.32%
Hinduism	3.65%
Other or not stated	0.03%

According to the 2022 Bangladeshi census, Charghat Upazila had 61,107 households and a population of 224,845. 8.30% of the population were under 5 years of age. Charghat had a literacy rate (age 7 and over) of 70.99%: 72.74% for males and 69.27% for females, and a sex ratio of 99.02 males for every 100 females. 45,085 (20.05%) lived in urban areas.

According to the 2011 Census of Bangladesh, Charghat Upazila had 51,783 households and a population of 206,788. 39,004 (18.86%) were under 10 years of age. Charghat had a literacy rate (age 7 and over) of 47.68%, compared to the national average of 51.8%, and a sex ratio of 986 females per 1000 males. 38,409 (18.57%) lived in urban areas.

As of the 1991 Bangladesh census, Charghat has a population of 163,862. Males constitute 51.62% of the population, and females 48.38%. This upazila's eighteen-up population is 82,597. Charghat has an average literacy rate of 26.6% (7+ years), and the national average of 32.4% literate.

== Administration ==
Charghat Upazila is divided into Charghat Municipality and six union parishads: Bhaya Lakshmipur, Charghat, Nimpara, Salua, Sardah, and Yusufpur. The union parishads are subdivided into 93 mauzas and 115 villages.

== Education ==
According to Banglapedia, Sardah Government Pilot High School, founded in 1916, is a notable secondary school. Other notable schools and colleges are- Sardah Police Academy' (1912), Rajshahi Cadet College (1965), Yusufpur Krishi High School (1905), Salua Govt. Primary School (1985), Halidagachhi Govt. Primary School (1985).

== Hospital ==
Charghat Upazila Health Complex is the upazila-level government health complex in Charghat Upazila.

== Notable residents ==
- Prabhas Chandra Lahiri, member of the East Bengal Provincial Assembly and minister of finance in Abu Hussain Sarkar's provincial cabinet, was born at the village of Arani.

== See also ==
- Upazilas of Bangladesh
- Districts of Bangladesh
- Divisions of Bangladesh
