= Bagha Upazila =

Bagha Upazila বাঘা উপজেলা
- Upazila
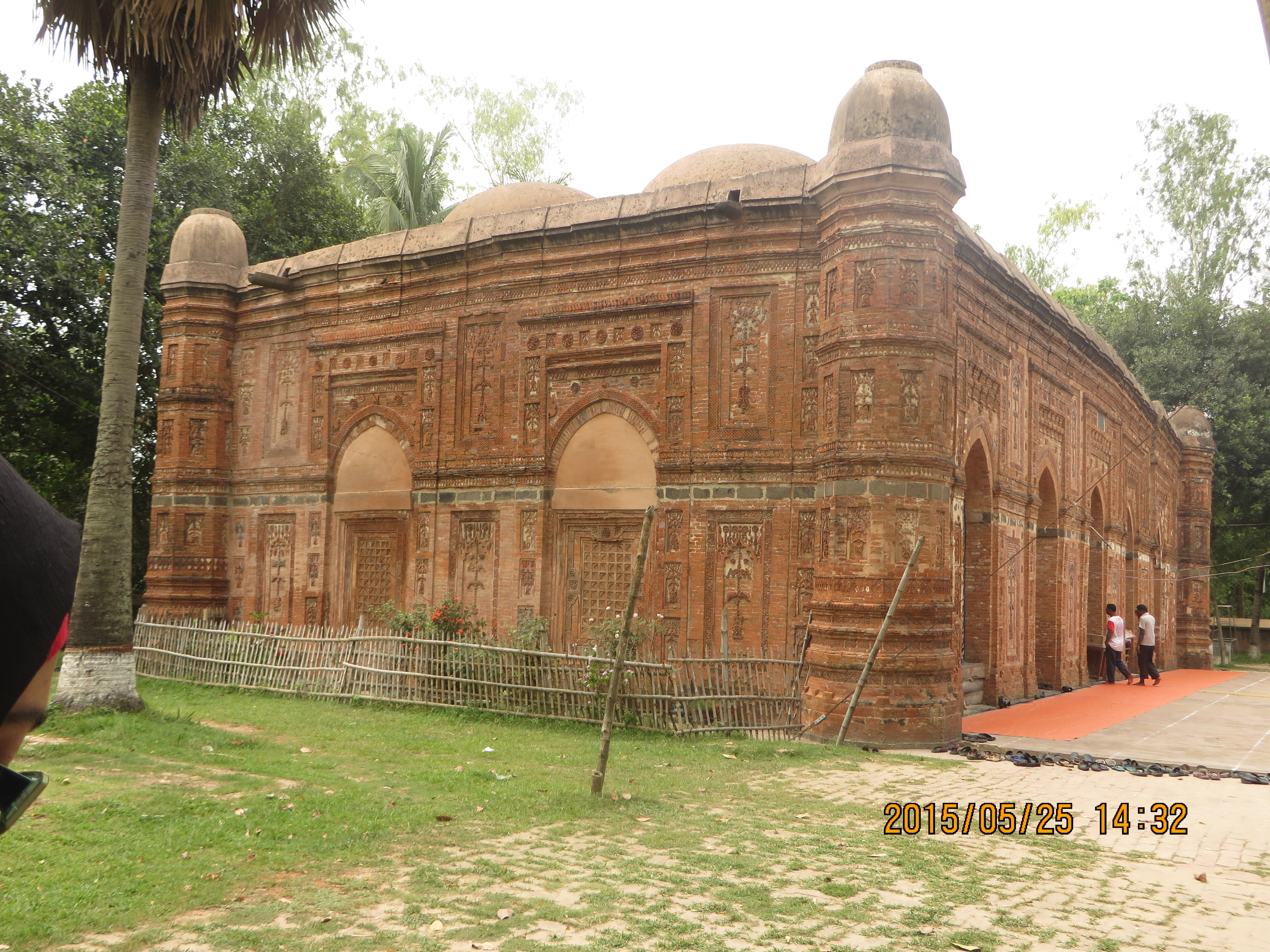
- Bagha Mosque

- Coordinates: 24°11.5′N 88°50′E
- Country: Bangladesh
- Division: Rajshahi
- District: Rajshahi
- Thana: 23 March 1983
- Upazila: 14 September 1983

Government
  - MP (Rajshahi-6): Md Abu Sayeed Chand
  - Upazila Chairman: Muhammad Layeb Uddin Lavlu

Area
  - Total: 185.16 km^{2} (71.49 sq mi)

Population (2022)
  - Total: 195,888
  - Density: 1,057.9/km^{2} (2,740.0/sq mi)
- Time zone: UTC+6 (BST)
- Postal code: 6280
- Website: bagha.rajshahi.gov.bd

Bagha Upazila mauza geocode map

Bagha Upazila (Bengali: বাঘা উপজেলা) is an upazila of the Rajshahi District, located in Bangladesh's Rajshahi Division.

== Geography ==
Bagha is located at 24.1917°N 88.8333°E. It has 46,711 households and total area 185.16 km^{2}.

Bagha Upazila is bounded by Charghat Upazila and Bagatipara Upazila, the latter in Natore District, on the north, Lalpur and Bagatipara Upazilas, both in Natore District, on the east, Daulatpur Upazila in Kushtia District, on the south and Jalangi CD Block, in Murshidabad district, West Bengal, India, on the west.

== History ==
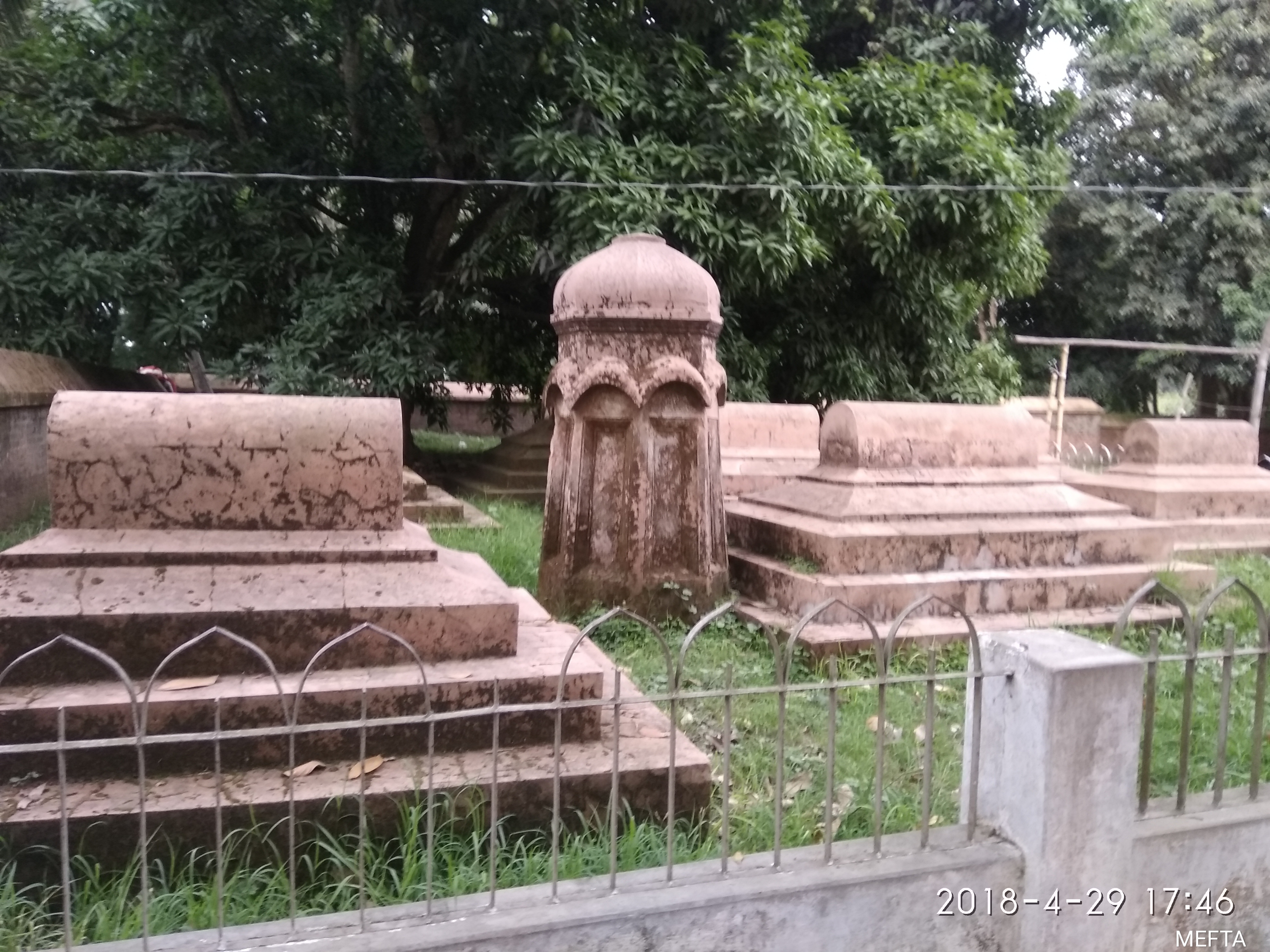
An ancient graveyard containing the tombs of Shah Dawlah and his companions who settled in Bagha to call the locals towards Islam.

Alaypur village of Bagha was the headquarters of Laskar Khan Jaigirdar during the sixteenth century. Hazrat Shah Doulah settled at Bagha and started preaching Islam after being granted 42 parganas by the rulers. He also established a famous madrasa here. Bagha thana of present-day Rajshahi district was a thriving centre of learning in the early Muslim period. The place became famous after Shah Muazzam Danishmand (Maulana Shah Daula) from Baghdad settled there during the reign of the Sultan of Bengal Nasiruddin Nasrat Shah (1519–32) and built his khanqah there. An inscription table of the time of Sultan Nusrat Shah was discovered there that records the construction of a Jam’i mosque in 930 A.H. (1523-24 A.D.) One Abdul Latif visited the Bagha madrasah in 1609. There he met an elderly Sufi named Hawadah Main (Maulana Hamid Danishmand) son of Maulana Shah Daula, who was running a madrasah and a khanqah in a peaceful environment. Probably the madrasah was established during the reign of Nusrat Shah.

During the Bangladesh Liberation War of 1971, temporary camps were founded by the Pakistan Army in places such as Narayanpur, Bagha, Pakuria, Arani, Alaipur and Chawkrajapur and many brawls took place in these camps against the 400 Bengali freedom fighters of Bagha. 7 of these freedom fighters has been martyr.

== Demographics ==
Religions in Bagha Upazila (2022)
Religion	Percent
Islam	95.09%
Hinduism	4.87%
Other or not stated	0.04%

According to the 2022 Bangladeshi census, Bagha Upazila had 53,727 households and a population of 195,888. 8.08% of the population were under 5 years of age. Bagha had a literacy rate (age 7 and over) of 70.06%: 72.06% for males and 68.10% for females, and a sex ratio of 98.67 males for every 100 females. 64,468 (32.91%) lived in urban areas.

According to the 2011 Census of Bangladesh, Bagha Upazila had 46,711 households and a population of 184,183. 35,215 (19.12%) were under 10 years of age. Bagha had a literacy rate (age 7 and over) of 49.65%, compared to the national average of 51.8%, and a sex ratio of 1002 females per 1000 males. 44,173 (23.98%) lived in urban areas.

== Administration ==
Bagha Upazila is divided into two Municipal Corporations and seven Union Parishads.

Municipal Corporations:

1. Arani Municipality
2. Bagha Municipality

Union Parishads:

1. Arani
2. Bajubagha
3. Bausa
4. Gargari
5. Manigram
6. Pakuria
7. Chakrajapur

The union parishads are subdivided into 99 mauzas and 78 villages.

=== Chairmen ===
List of chairmen
Number	Name	Started
01	Muhammad Abdul Aziz	15/8/1985
02	Muhammad Bayezul Islam Khan	18/2/1990
03	Muhammad Bayezul Islam Khan	23/2/2009
04	Muhammad Layeb Uddin Labhlu	Present

== Economy and tourism ==
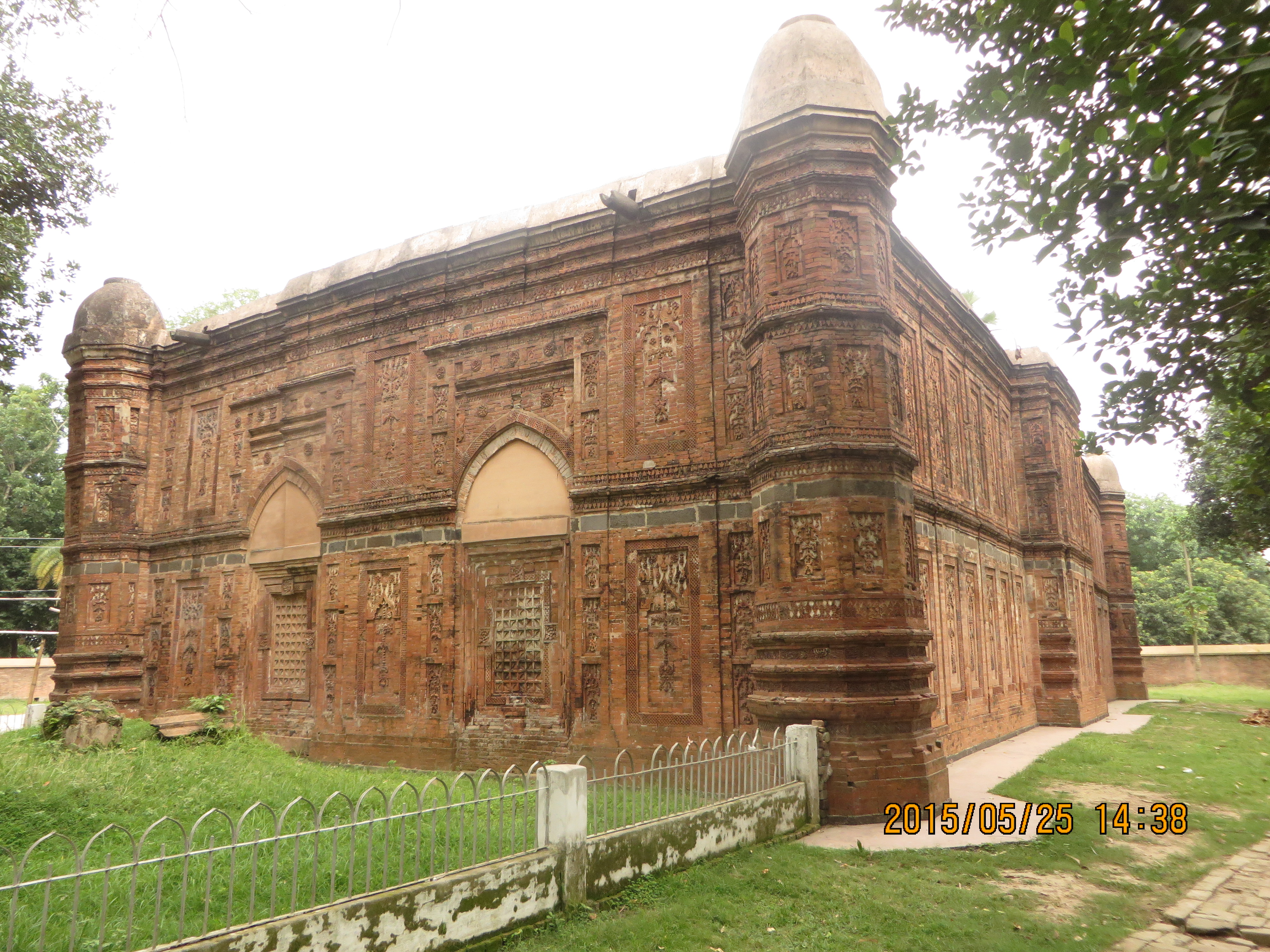
The historic 10-domed Shahi Mosque of Bagha

Bagha Upazila is home to 343 mosques, most notably the ancient Bagha Mosque complex which also contains the mazar (mausoleum) of Shah Dawlah, a key figure who propagated Islam in the region. The mazar of Dilal Bukhari is in Alaipur. The indigo factory (nilkuthi) at Mirganj is a relic of the colonial period and is currently used as a silk factory. Bagha Museum is also a tourist spot of Bagha Upazila.

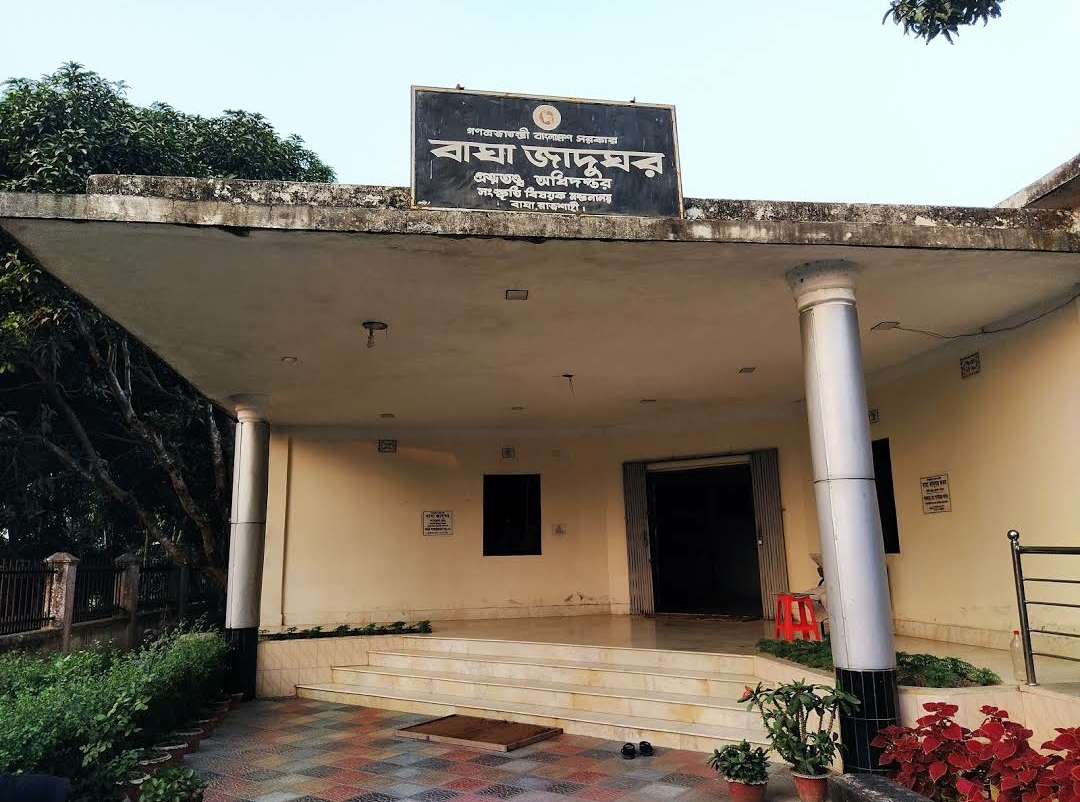
Bagha Museum

== Education ==
There a number of madrasas in Bagha Upazila which provide educational services to the local community. Some of these include:

List of madrasas
Name	Headteacher
Darul Uloom Dakhil Madrasa	Muhammad Yunus Ali
Parsaota Alim Madrasa	Muhammad Bazlul Karim
Bagha Fazil Madrasa	Muhammad Abdul Ghafur Miah
Bausha Hedatipara Dakhil Madrasa	Muhammad Abdur Rashid
Arani Dakhil Madrasa	Muhammad Abu Hanif
Arani Chakarpara Dakhil Madrasa	Muhammad Shamimuzzaman
Sultanpur Gorasthan Dakhil Madrasa	Muhammad Abdul Mannaf
Jot Qadirpur Dakhil Madrasa	Mosammat Rafiyah Sultanah
Manigram Dakhil Madrasa	Muhammad Tahurul Islam

== Notable people ==
- Shahriar Alam, politician
- Polan Sarkar, social activist
- Prabhas Chandra Lahiri, politician
- Nazmul Hoque Sarkar, lawyer

== See also ==
- Upazilas of Bangladesh
- Districts of Bangladesh
- Divisions of Bangladesh
- Shah Makhdum Rupos, medieval Iraqi saint who visited the area
