= Bagha Museum =

Museum of Rajshahi district

- বাঘা জাদুঘর
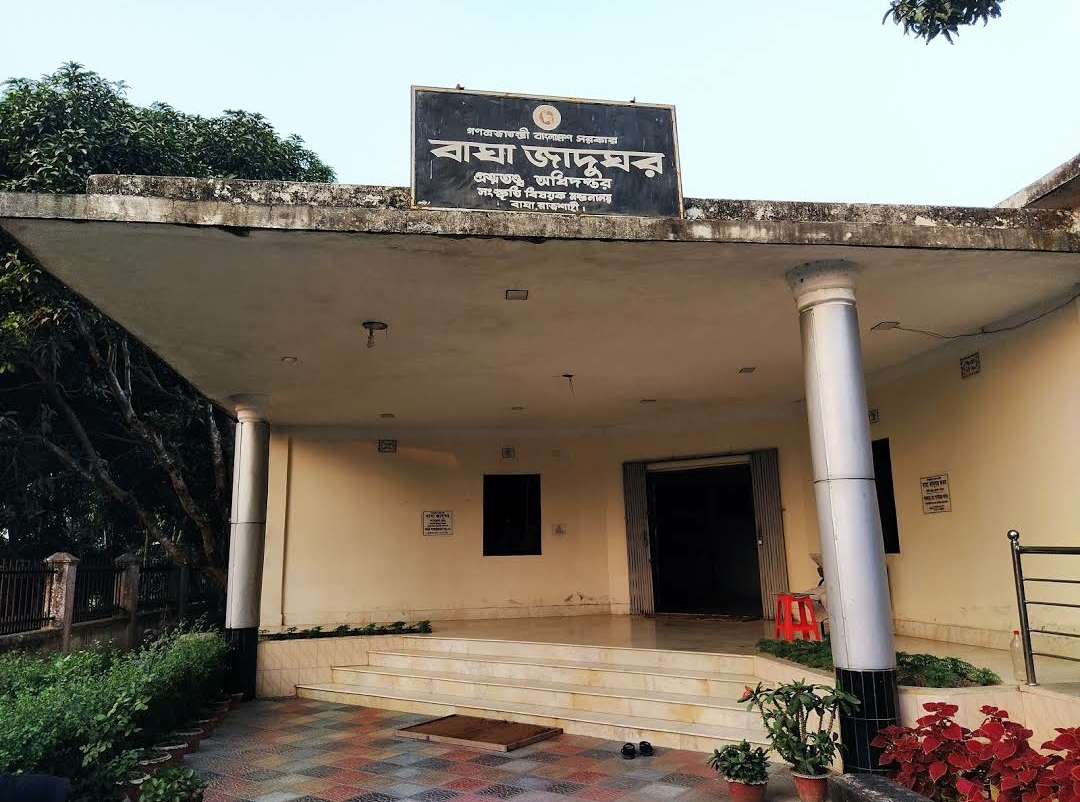

- Location of Bagha Museum within Bangladesh
- Established: 7 May 2015
- Location: Bagha, Rajshahi, Bangladesh
- Coordinates: 24.19811°N 88.83992°E
- Owner: Bangladesh Government
- Building details

General information
- Construction started: June 2011
- Completed: July 2012
- Cost: 62,00,000 Taka

Bagha Museum (Bengali: বাঘা জাদুঘর) is a museum in the Bagha Upazila of Rajshahi District in Bangladesh. It was established in July 2012 and opened for public on 7 May 2015.

== History ==
This museum is maintained by Department of Archaeology (Bangladesh). Though the construction was completed in July 2012, the museum was opened for the public on 7 May 2015.

== Schedule ==
In summer it is open from 10 am to 6 pm. In the middle of the day from 1 pm to 1.30 pm for half an hour it will close. In winter, it is open from 9 am to 5 pm. Fridays are closed from 12:30 to 3:30 for Jumma prayers. Sunday is the public holiday and Mondays are open from 2:00 p.m. The museum is also open on special government days.

== Ticket prices ==
There is a ticket counter next to the gate of the museum. Tickets cost 15 taka per person, however tickets are not required for any child under five years. The entrance fee for secondary level children and adolescents is 5 taka. Tickets cost 50 taka for SAARC foreign visitors and 200 taka for other foreign visitors.

== Gallery ==
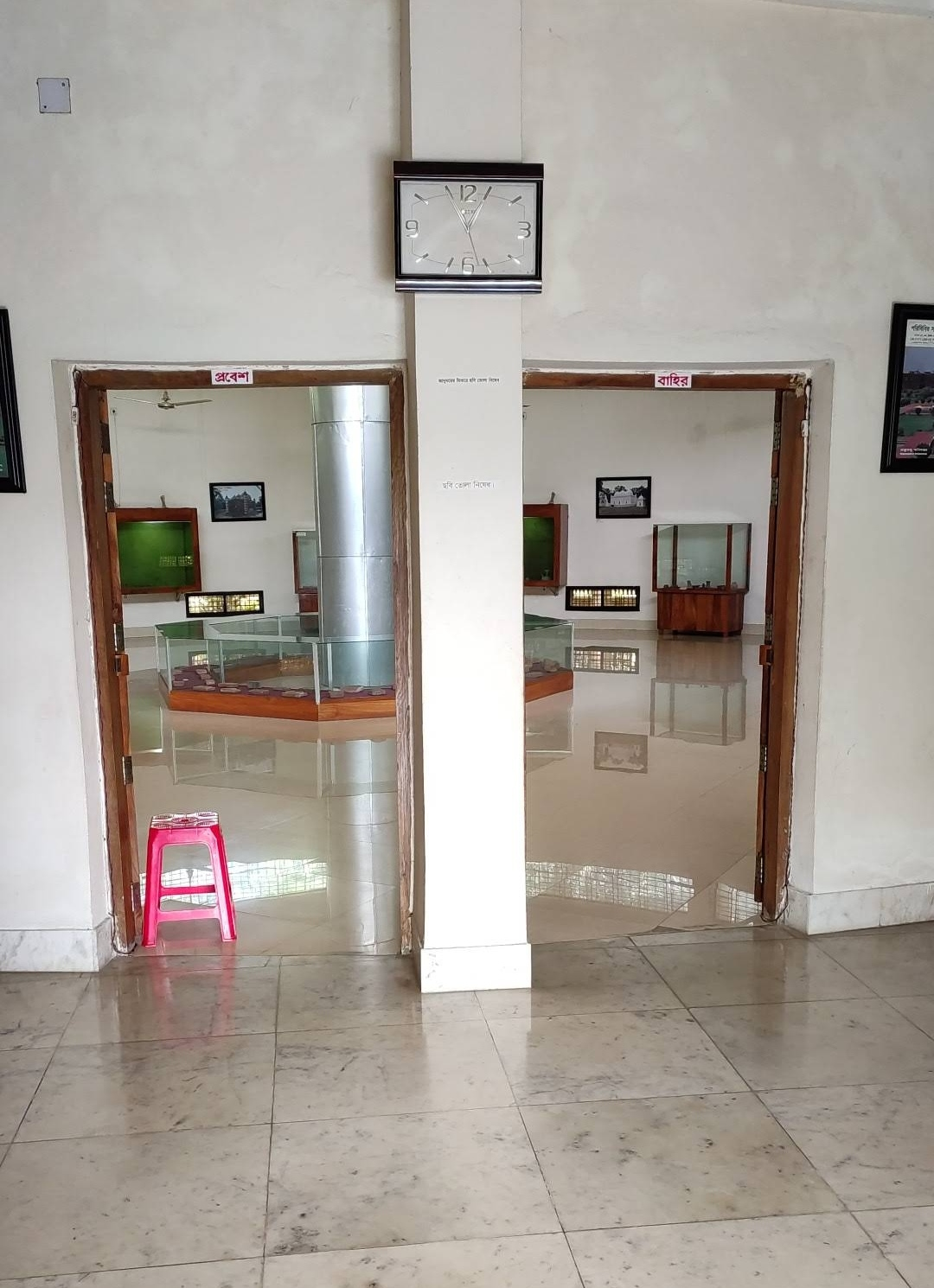

== See also ==
- List of museums in Bangladesh
