= Atowar Rahman Talukder =

Bangladeshi politician

Member of Bangladesh Parliament
- In office 1973–1976
- Succeeded by: Mohammad Maqbool Hossain

Personal details
- Party: Bangladesh Awami League

Atowar Rahman Talukder is a Bangladesh Awami League politician and a former member of parliament for Rajshahi-6.

== Career ==
Talukder was elected to parliament from Rajshahi-6 as a Bangladesh Awami League candidate in 1973.
