= Nazmul Hoque Sarkar =

Pakistan lawyer and politician

Nazmul Hoque Sarkar was a lawyer, politician, and elected member of the National Assembly of Pakistan who was killed in the Bangladesh Liberation War in 1971 and is considered a martyr in Bangladesh.

== Early life ==
Sarkar was born in Harirampur, Bagha Upazila, Rajshahi District, in 1937. He graduated from Kalidaskhali School in 1952 and from Rajshahi College in 1955. He afterwards completed his Bachelor of Law degree and joined the District Bar of Rajshahi.

== Career ==
Sarkar served as the general secretary of the District Bar of Rajshahi for two consecutive terms. He joined the Dhaka High Court bar in 1966. He served as the Rajshahi District vice-president and later president of the Bangladesh Awami League. In 1970, he was elected to the National Assembly of Pakistan from Rajshahi-8 constituency on an Awami League ticket. He organized the non-cooperation movement in Rajshahi in 1971.

== Death ==
On 25 March 1971, at the start of Operation Searchlight and the Bangladesh Liberation War, he was taken by the Pakistan Army and was never seen again. After the independence of Bangladesh, the government established Shaheed Nazmul Hoque High School in Kadirganj in Rajshahi district in 1972. The Bangladesh Post Office released commemorative postal stamps in his name on 14 November 1998.
