= Rajshahi-6 =

Constituency of Bangladesh's Jatiya Sangsad

Coordinates: 24.29°N 88.75°E

- Constituency for the Jatiya Sangsad
- District: Rajshahi District
- Division: Rajshahi Division
- Electorate: 357,054 (2026)

Current constituency
- Created: 1973 (Original); 2008 (Redistricted)
- Party: Bangladesh Nationalist Party
- Member: Abu Sayeed Chand
- ← 56 Rajshahi-5 58 Natore-1 →

Rajshahi-6 is a constituency represented in the Jatiya Sangsad (National Parliament) of Bangladesh since 2026 by Abu Sayeed Chand of the Bangladesh Nationalist Party.

== Boundaries ==
The constituency encompasses Bagha and Charghat Upazilas.

== History ==
The constituency was created from the former Rajshahi-5 constituency when, ahead of the 2008 general election, the Election Commission redrew constituency boundaries to reflect population changes revealed by the 2001 Bangladesh census. The 2008 reapportionment transferred one seat from Sirajganj District to Rajshahi District. The new seat took the name Rajshahi-3, bumping up by one the suffix of the former constituency of that name and higher numbered constituencies in the district.

== Members of Parliament ==
Election	Member	Party
1973	Atowar Rahman Talukder	Awami League
1979	Mohammad Maqbool Hossain	Bangladesh Nationalist Party
Major Boundary Changes
2008	Shahriar Alam	Awami League
2014	Shahriar Alam	Awami League
2018	Shahriar Alam	Awami League
2024	Shahriar Alam	Awami League
2026	Abu Sayeed Chand	Bangladesh Nationalist Party

== Elections ==
=== Elections in the 2020s ===
General election 2026: Rajshahi-6
Party	Candidate	Votes	%	±%
BNP	Abu Sayeed Chand	148,672		
Jamaat	Md. Nazmul Haque	92,965		
Majority				
Turnout				
Registered electors		357,054		
BNP gain from AL				

=== Elections in the 2010s ===
General Election 2014: Rajshahi-6
Party	Candidate	Votes	%	±%
AL	Shahriar Alam	70,110	76.6	+20.7
Independent	Md. Rahenul Haque Raihan	21,463	23.4	N/A
Majority		48,647	53.1	+40.9
Turnout		91,573	33.4	−58.2
AL hold				

=== Elections in the 2000s ===
General Election 2008: Rajshahi-6
Party	Candidate	Votes	%	±%
AL	Shariar Alam	126,807	55.9	
BNP	Azizur Rahman	99,148	43.7	
BDB	Maskaol Ahoshan	501	0.2	
JSD	Nurul Islam	436	0.2	
Majority		27,659	12.2	
Turnout		226,892	91.6	
AL win (new seat)				
