= Mohammad Maqbool Hossain =

Bangladeshi politician (born 1930)

Member of Bangladesh Parliament
- In office 1979–1986
- Preceded by: Atowar Rahman Talukder
- Succeeded by: Shahriar Alam

Personal details
- Born: 1 March 1930 Akkelpur, British India
- Party: Bangladesh Nationalist Party

Mohammad Maqbool Hossain (born 1 March 1930) is a Bangladesh Nationalist Party politician and a former member of parliament for Rajshahi-6.

== Life and career ==
Mohammad Maqbool Hossain was born on 1 March 1930 in Akkelpur village in what is now Bangladesh.

He was elected to parliament from Rajshahi-6 as a Bangladesh Nationalist Party candidate in 1979.
