= Shahriar Alam =

Bangladeshi politician (born 1970)

- শাহরিয়ার আলম
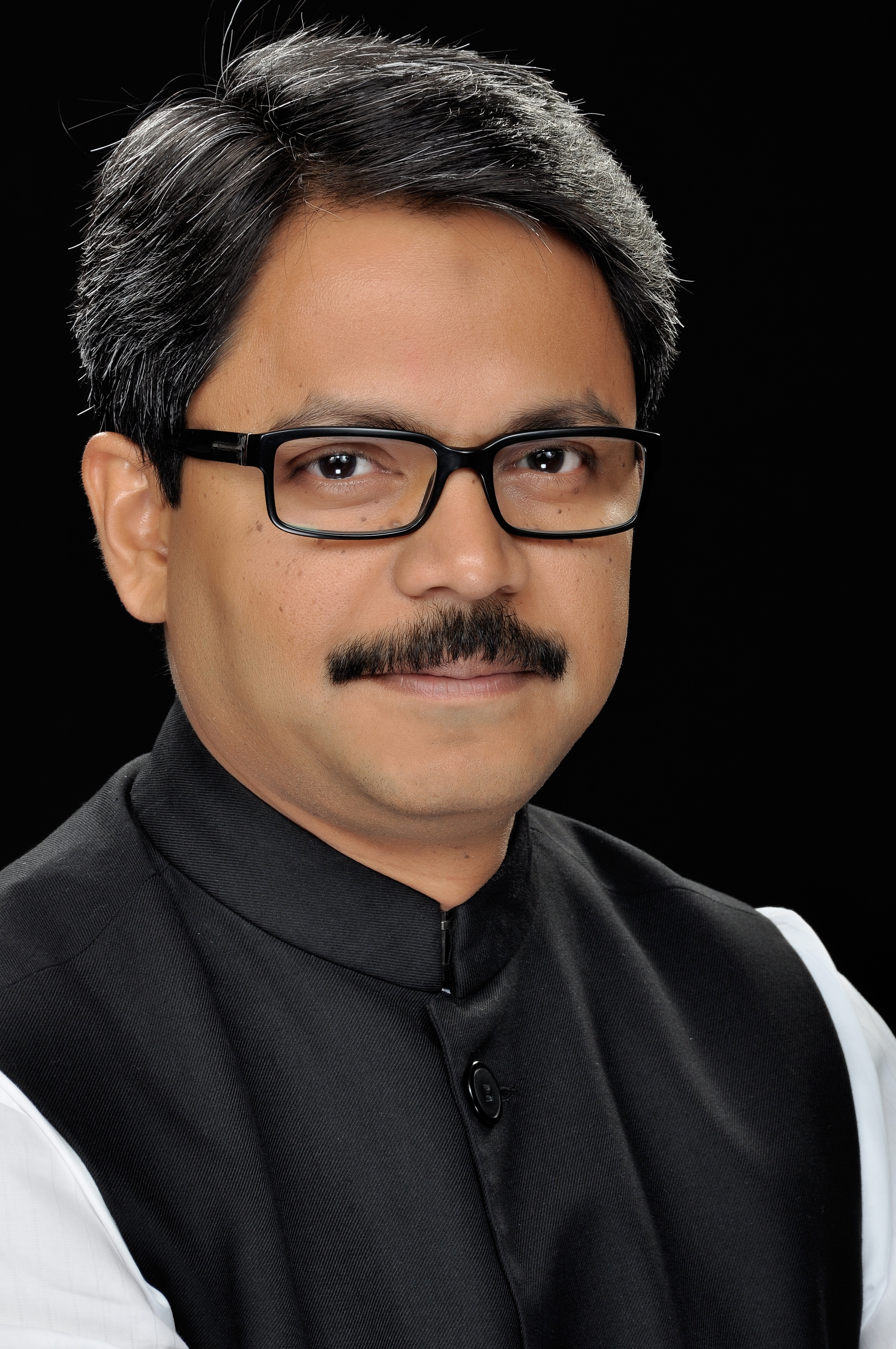
- Alam in 2016

Minister of State for Foreign Affairs
- In office 29 January 2014 – 9 January 2024
- Prime Minister: Sheikh Hasina
- Preceded by: Hasan Mahmud
- Succeeded by: Shama Obaed

Member of the Bangladesh Parliament for Rajshahi-6
- In office 25 January 2009 – 6 August 2024
- Preceded by: Mohammad Maqbool Hossain
- Succeeded by: Abu Sayeed Chand

Personal details
- Born: 1 March 1970 (age 56) Chittagong, Pakistan
- Party: Awami League
- Education: Dhaka City College; University of Dhaka
- Committees: Standing Committee on Ministry of Science and Technology
- Website: www.shahriaralam.com

Shahriar Alam (Bengali: শাহরিয়ার আলম; born 1 March 1970) is a Bangladeshi politician. He served as the state minister of foreign relations for Bangladesh from 2014 to 2024.

== Early life ==
Shahriar Alam was born to the family of Mohammad Shamsuddin and Hafiza Khatun in Chittagong District. He spent his early life in Lalmonirhat and Rajshahi.

== Education ==
In 1985, he passed his SSC from Seroil Government High School, Rajshahi, and his HSC from New Government Degree College, Rajshahi, in 1988. He received his Bachelor of Commerce degree from Dhaka City College and obtained an MBA from the Institute of Business Administration (IBA), University of Dhaka, afterwards. Shahriar completed the 1st capstone course at the Bangladesh National Defence College (NDC).

== Career ==
In 1995, Alam embarked on his career as a businessman in the Ready Made Garments (RMG) sector. Being a prominent entrepreneur with a diverse range of interests, he primarily focused on the textile industry, which provided employment to 25,000 workers. His company emerged as a leading exporter, catering to major destinations such as Japan, Australia, and Russia. In recognition of his achievements, he was awarded the National Export Trophy in the Knitwear Category for 2007-2008. Additionally, Alam's business house collaborated with the Center for the Rehabilitation of the Paralyzed (CRP) to train and employ the highest number of physically challenged individuals, earning him a CSR Award from global buyers.

=== Politics ===
Alam was elected for the Rajshahi-6 (Bagha-Charghat) constituency of the Jatiya Sangsad in the 2014 general elections. He has been working as an active member of the Bangladesh Awami League since 1997. He was elected a member of the Jatiya Sangsad for the first time from the Rajshahi-6 constituency in the maximum parliamentary elections in the 2008 parliamentary elections. While working as a member of the Parliamentary Standing Committee on the Ministry of Information of the Jatiya Sangsad, he worked for the finalization of the draft of the Right to Information Act. Besides, he is a member of the Standing Committee on Ministry of Science and Technology related to the Jatiya Sangsad, All Party Parliamentary Group on Climate Change, Education and Poverty Alleviation and MDG, PRSP, World Trade Organization and Vice Chairman of All Party Parliamentary Group regarding Bangladesh Development Forum. Shahriar Alam has served as a member of the Parliament Committee on the preview committee. He was earlier a member of the sub-committee on the Awami League's information, research and publicity and publication.

After the fall of the Sheikh Hasina-led Awami League government, Alam's home was vandalized and burned down in February 2025. His house was again burned down on 19 November 2026.
