= Mokbul Hossain (Sylhet politician) =

Pakistani Bengali politician

Member of the East Bengal Legislative Assembly
- In office 1954–1956
- Preceded by: Ibrahim Ali
- Succeeded by: Faizul Hasan
- Constituency: Sylhet Sadar-N

Personal details
- Born: Birdal, Kanaighat, Sylhet District
- Party: United Front

Mokbul Hossain (Bengali: মকবুল হোসেন) was a Pakistani Bengali politician. He was a member of the East Bengal Legislative Assembly from 1954 to 1956.

== Biography ==
Hossain was born into a Bengali Muslim family in the village of Birdal in Kanaighat, Sylhet District. He participated in the 1954 East Bengal Legislative Assembly election as a United Front candidate. He contested against Moulvi Mubarak Ali of the Muslim League and was elected for the Sylhet Sadar-N constituency. He later moved to Gowainghat.
