= Abu Sayeed Chand =

Bangladeshi politician (born 1957)

- আবু সাইদ চাঁদ

Member of Parliament
- Incumbent
- Assumed office 17 February 2026
- Preceded by: Shahriar Alam
- Constituency: Rajshahi-6

Personal details
- Born: 2 January 1957 (age 69) Charghat Upazila, Rajshahi District, East Pakistan
- Party: Bangladesh Nationalist Party
- Occupation: Politician

Abu Sayeed Chand (born 2 January 1957) is a Bangladeshi politician who was elected as a Member of Parliament for the Rajshahi-6 constituency as a candidate of the Bangladesh Nationalist Party with the party symbol Sheaf of Paddy in the 2026 Bangladeshi general election for the first time.

On 21 October 2026, Chand received criticism for receiving a Tk12,500 government incentive for sugarcane cultivation. Chand claimed that he had received the incentive as a farmer, not as a politician, saying his family had been involved in sugarcane cultivation for generations.

== See also ==
- List of members of the 13th Jatiya Sangsad
