= Bagatipara Upazila =

Bagatipara Upazila বাগাতিপাড়া উপজেলা
- Upazila
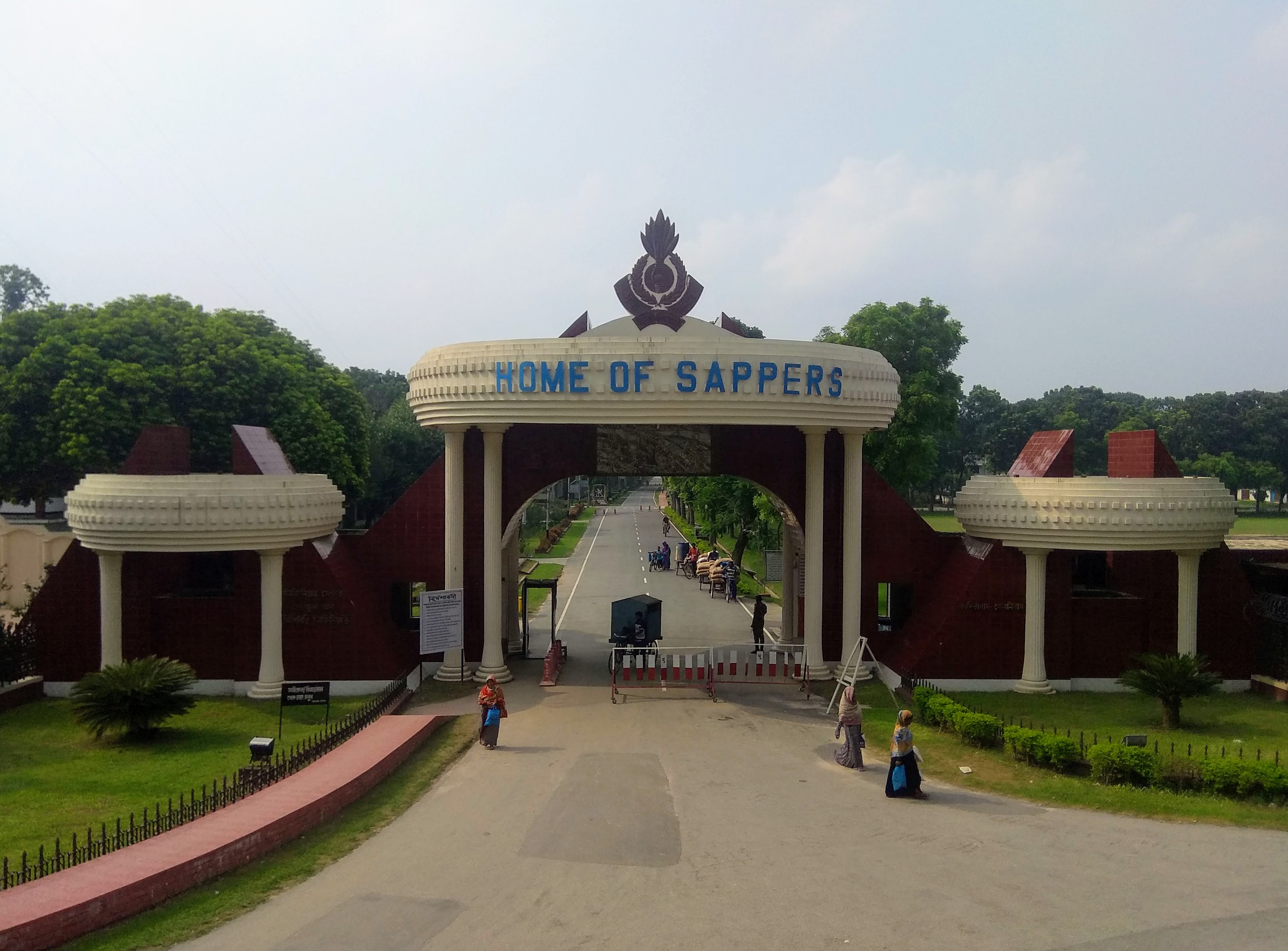
- Qadirabad Cantonment

- Coordinates: 24°19.8′N 88°56.7′E
- Country: Bangladesh
- Division: Rajshahi
- District: Natore

Area
  - Total: 139.85 km^{2} (54.00 sq mi)

Population (2022)
  - Total: 140,699
  - Density: 1,006.1/km^{2} (2,605.7/sq mi)
- Time zone: UTC+6 (BST)
- Postal code: 6410
- Website: Official Website

Bagatipara Upazila mauza geocode map

Bagatipara Upazila (Bengali: বাগাতিপাড়া উপজেলা) is an upazila of Natore District in the Division of Rajshahi, Bangladesh.

== Geography ==
Bagatipara is located at 24.3306°N 88.9444°E. It has an area of 139.85 km^{2} and is bounded by Natore Sadar Upazila on the north, Lalpur Upazila on the south, Baraigram Upazila on the east and Charghat, Bagha and Puthia Upazilas on the west. The soil of the upazila is mainly plain; there are few depressions. The main river is Boral.

== Demographics ==
Historical population
Year	Pop. (000)	±%
1981	224	—
1991	275	+22.8%
2001	119	−56.7%
2011	131	+10.1%
2022	141	+7.6%
Source: Bangladesh Bureau of Statistics

Religions in Bagatipara Upazila (2022)
Religion	Percent
Islam	95.12%
Hinduism	4.58%
Other or not stated	0.30%

According to the 2022 Bangladeshi census, Bagatipara Upazila had 38,450 households and a population of 140,699. 7.77% of the population were under 5 years of age. Bagatipara had a literacy rate (age 7 and over) of 75.25%: 77.84% for males and 72.78% for females, and a sex ratio of 96.18 males for every 100 females. 18,489 (13.14%) lived in urban areas.

According to the 2011 Census of Bangladesh, Bagatipara Upazila had 33,383 households and a population of 131,004. 24,388 (18.62%) were under 10 years of age. Bagatipara had a literacy rate (age 7 and over) of 56.53%, compared to the national average of 51.8%, and a sex ratio of 1014 females per 1000 males. 9,975 (7.61%) lived in urban areas.

== Administration ==
Bagatipara Thana was formed in 1906 and it was turned into an upazila on 15 April 1983.

The Upazila is divided into Bagatipara Municipality and five union parishads: Bagatipara, Dayarampur, Faguardiar, Jamnagor, and Panka. The union parishads are subdivided into 93 mauzas and 134 villages.

Bagatipara Municipality is subdivided into 9 wards and 17 mahallas.

== See also ==
- Upazilas of Bangladesh
- Districts of Bangladesh
- Divisions of Bangladesh
